= Dry Valley (novel) =

1912 novella by Ivan Bunin

- Author: Ivan Bunin
- Original title: Суходол
- Language: Russian
- Genre: Gothic novel
- Publisher: Vestnik Evropy
- Publication date: 1912
- Publication place: Russia
- Media type: Print (hardback & paperback)
- Preceded by: The Village (1910)
- Followed by: Ioann the Mourner (1913)

Dry Valley (Russian: Суходол, romanized: Sukhodo′l) is a short Gothic novel by a Nobel Prize-winning Russian author Ivan Bunin, first published in the April 1912 issue of the Saint Petersburg Vestnik Evropy magazine.

Having come out soon after The Village (1910), it is usually linked to the latter as the author's second major book concerning the bleak state of Russia as a whole and its rural community in particular. It is also regarded as the last in Bunin's early 1900s cycle of "gentry elegies". The novel was filmed in 2011, directed by Aleksandra Strelyanaya.

== Plot ==
The novel is narrated by a descendant of the Khrushchev family, who reconstructs the history of Sukhudol (Dry Valley), the family's declining estate in the Oryol Governorate, through the stories told by Natalia, an elderly serf who served the household and is the narrator's father's milk-sister.

The patriarch, Pyotr Kirillovich, descends into madness after his wife's early death. He lives in constant conflict with Gervaska, a serf rumoured to be his illegitimate son. Gervaska is insolent and domineering, treating the master with contempt. Pyotr Kirillovich hires French tutors for his children—son Arkady, daughter Tonya, and another son Pyotr Petrovich—but refuses to send them to the city for proper education, leaving them without learning or supervision.

When Pyotr Petrovich returns from military service, he brings along his friend Voitkevich. Both Tonya and the young servant Natalia fall in love: Tonya with the silent, mysterious Voitkevich, and Natalia with the handsome but cruel Pyotr Petrovich. Voitkevich departs without declaring his feelings for Tonya, leaving only a crushed butterfly on her piano as a memento. When a maid accidentally wipes away this trace of him, Tonya has a breakdown and gradually loses her mind, eventually declaring herself a bride of Christ.

Natalia, hopelessly devoted to Pyotr Petrovich, steals a small mirror from him as a keepsake. When discovered, she is exiled to the remote farm of Soshki as punishment. Meanwhile, tensions escalate between Pyotr Kirillovich and Gervaska. After a public humiliation, the patriarch seeks protection from local authorities, but the next morning Gervaska confronts him and strikes him in the chest. The old man falls, hits his head on a card table, and dies. Gervaska flees and vanishes.

Natalia is eventually recalled from exile to care for the mad Tonya. The household fills with wandering holy fools and pilgrims, among them a deformed vagrant named Yushka who claims to be a former monk. He rapes Natalia, who becomes pregnant but suffers a miscarriage when the manor house burns down.

Pyotr Petrovich, now married to Klaudia Markovna, is killed when his horse tramples him as he returns drunk from his mistress. Years pass, and the estate falls into ruin. Pyotr Petrovich's son eventually sells the last of the land and takes work as a train conductor. In the novel's present, three old women—Klaudia Markovna, the mad Tonya, and the faithful Natalia—live out their final days amid the remnants of the estate, bound together by their attachment to Sukhudol and their shared memories of its dark past.

The inhabitants adopt a fatalistic attitude toward their misfortunes, feeling surrounded by primordial forces they cannot resist and seeming almost to embrace chaos and destruction. The novel suggests that the final stage of Sukhudol's destruction will be the inevitable disappearance of even its memories.

== History ==
Bunin started working upon the book in summer 1911, when at the Vasilyevsky estate in Oryol Governorate. In September of that year he wrote to the Moskovskaya Vest correspondent: "I've just finished the first part of a large novelet called Dry Valley". The work was finished in December 1911 on Capri where Bunin stayed at Maxim Gorky's home. On February 21 he read it to the host and another visiting guest, Mykhailo Kotsiubynsky. Both praised the book, the latter likened it to "an old tapestry."

The book's plot was fictional but numerous details in it later proved to be autobiographical. The Sukhodol estate bore close resemblance to a family country house in the Oryol Governorate owned by Bunin's uncle Nikolay Nikolayevich where Ivan with his younger sister Masha were frequent guests. The prototype for aunt Tonya was Bunin's aunt Varvara Nikolayevna who lived in a large neighbouring country house (and was, in Vera Muromtseva's assessment, "slightly off-kilter"). Pyotr Kyrillovich character in the book was a veiled portrait of Bunin's grandfather Nikolay Dmitrievich (whose mother, born Uvarova, died young).

=== Critical reception ===
As Ivan Bunin's previous book, The Village, this one divided critical opinion. Some, like Vladimir Kranikhfeld, hailed it as masterpiece. "In Sukhodol Bunin summed up the whole of the [Russia']s past and endowed it with magnificent monument", he wrote in Sovremenny Mir (Modern World). Others criticized the author for negativism. "Dirty, hungry, eaten through to its very bones by illnesses and lice – such is Russia as seen through the eyes of Sukodol' author," argued L. Kozlovsky in Russkiye Vedomosti.
