= Nikolay Radkevich =

Russian serial killer

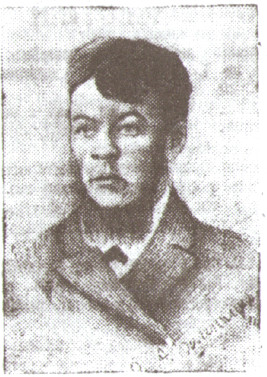
- Born: Nikolay Vladimirovich Radkevich; 1888; Russian Empire
- Died: Autumn 1916 (aged 27–28); Russian Empire
- Cause of death: Murdered by fellow inmates
- Other names: "Vadim the Bloodsucker"; Vadim Krovianik
- Conviction: Murder
- Penalty: 8 years of penal labor

Details
- Victims: 3
- Span of crimes: June – September 1909
- Country: Russia
- State: St. Petersburg
- Date apprehended: 17 September 1909

Nikolay Vladimirovich Radkevich (c. 1888 – autumn 1916), known as Vadim the Bloodsucker, was a serial killer in the Russian Empire.

== Biography ==
Radkevich's exact birthplace and date of birth are unknown. By his own admission, he was a cadet of the Arakcheev Cadet Corps in Nizhny Novgorod. At the age of 14, he was tempted by a "depraved woman" who was about 30 years old. After a while she abandoned the young man, but not before she infected him with syphilis. Upon learning this, Radkevich was enraged and tried to kill his former beloved, but did not succeed, as the woman's new lover captured the failed assassin and took him to the station. After a disturbing scandal, Radkevich was expelled from the Cadet Corps.

Radkevich decided that the vocation of his whole life was the purification of the world from depraved women. He committed his first murder in June 1909, killing 20-year-old prostitute Anna Blumentrost. In total, Radkevich inflicted 12 stab wounds to her face, neck and shoulders, and then dropped the body in the Neva River. On 1 July, the body was found and identified. In St. Petersburg, prostitutes began to panic, and the police began to search for the gory murderer in force.

On 14 July 1909, Radkevich met with a prostitute in Vosstaniya Square, Ekaterina Gerus. He brought her to the "Danube" hotel, which was at that time on Ligovsky Avenue, and ordered the number 9 room on the 3rd floor. At night, Radkevich stabbed Gerus at least 20 times with a knife but did not kill her this way, and strangled her instead. The next day at 8 AM Radkevich left the room, telling the bellhop to wake her up in an hour. The bellhop soon discovered Gerus' body. Investigators came to the conclusion that both murders were committed by one criminal. On July 24, Radkevich attacked maid Zinaida Levin. With the cry of "Death to beauties!", he began to strike her with his knife, but was frightened by random passers-by, and he fled without completing what had been started. On the following day, Radkevich made another unsuccessful attack on a prostitute in a brothel on Kolomenskaya Street. Most of his casual acquaintances represented Radkevich as Vadim Krovianik, for which he later received his nickname, and perhaps that was why he could not be caught in the early stages. The investigation into the Radkevich case was personally led by the head of the St. Petersburg Detective Police Vladimir Filippov. Radkevich committed his last murder on September 19, 1909. On that day he, according to the scenario of 14 July, lured the prostitute Maria Budocnikov to the hotel "Kiao", where he inflicted 35 stab wounds, robbed her and then left a note on the bed:

...Money is taken for the labor of sending to the next world and because they are not needed for the dead. The murderer of this woman and E. Gerus in the hotel "Danube" - Vadim Krovianik...

But the bellhop was vigilant, and when he saw Budocnikova's corpse through the keyhole, he made a slight noise. Radkevich tried to resist the bellhop by hitting him with a knife, but hotel employees arrived on time to detain Radkevich.

=== Trial, sentence and death ===
Initially, Radkevich was placed in the psychiatric hospital of St. Nicholas the Wonderworker, which was on the bank of the Pryazhkha River. Psychiatrists' opinions were divided: according to some, he was a sadist, fully responsible for his actions, and according to others — a degenerate with congenital defects, captivated by a false sense of righteousness. On 10 March 1912, a jury trial took place, which sentenced Nikolay Radkevich to eight years in the katorga. In the autumn of 1916 he was killed by fellow inmates while serving his sentence.

== Notoriety ==
Radkevich has often been described in later Russian true-crime and legal writing as one of the earliest recorded serial killers in the Russian Empire. He is frequently referred to in retrospective accounts as the "Petersburg Jack the Ripper" and "Vadim the Bloodsucker". The case is also remembered for the investigation led by Vladimir Filippov, then head of the St. Petersburg detective police, whose work was later cited as an example of early twentieth-century criminal investigation in the imperial capital. Modern retellings note that the murders attracted sustained public and press attention in St. Petersburg. The case has continued to appear in Russian historical and criminological retrospectives more than a century later.

Radkevich is the main prototype of Sokolovich in Loopy Ears, a 1917 story written by Ivan Bunin.

== See also ==
- List of Russian serial killers
