= The Gentleman from San Francisco =

1915 short story by Ivan Bunin

- Short story by Ivan Bunin
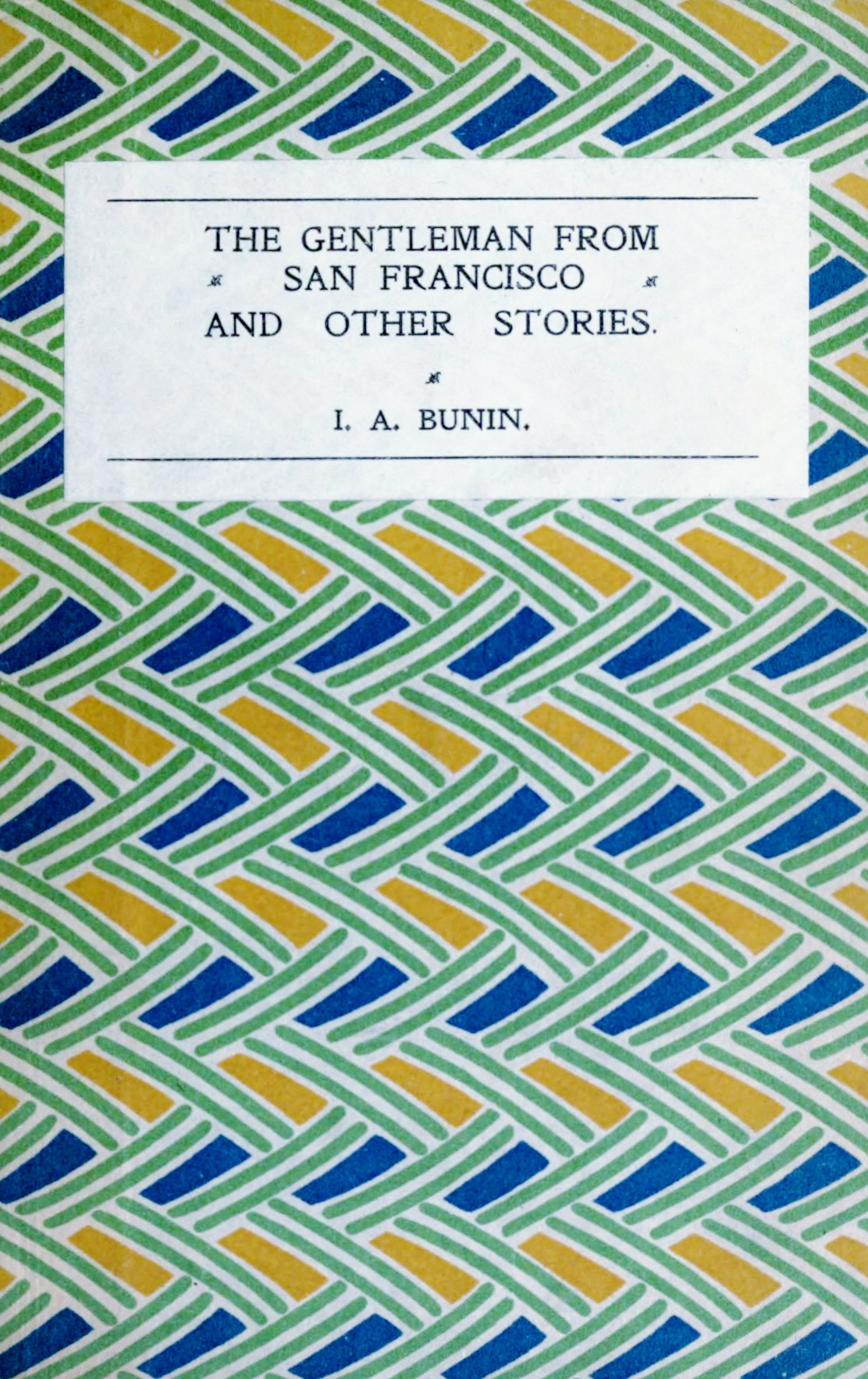
- Cover to the 1922 English edition (featuring the translation by D. H. Lawrence)
- Original title: Господин из Сан-Франциско
- Country: Russia
- Language: Russian

Publication
- Published in: Slovo No.5
- Publication type: Anthology
- Publication date: 1915
- Published in English: 1922

"The Gentleman from San Francisco" (Russian: Господи́н из Сан-Франци́ско, romanized: Gospodín iz San-Frantsísko) is a short story by the Nobel Prize-winning Russian author Ivan Bunin, written in 1915 and published the same year in Moscow, in the 5th volume of Slovo (Word) anthology. Translated into English by S. S. Koteliansky and D. H. Lawrence and first published in The Dial in January 1922, the story is one of Bunin's best known and regarded as classic.

== Background ==
Bunin recollected the circumstances that led to the story's inception in a brochure called "The Origins of My Stories", compiled and published by P. Vyacheslavov. Thomas Mann's Death in Venice book sleeve, which had caught Bunin's eye in one of the Moscow book shops, served as a starting point for the story's associative chain. Some time later in Oryol Governorate it came back to him again, this time linked to the sudden death of a certain American citizen which occurred on the island of Capri. "Almost instantly the idea of a story [called initially] "Death on Capri" came to me and in four days I finished the piece. Everything else, San Francisco included, was pure fantasy. Nothing in it was real apart from the fact that once a certain American had really died after dinner in Quisisana hotel", Bunin wrote.

The rough copies and alternative versions of the story show the dynamics of its ever-changing history. Over the years Bunin, driven (in Chekhov's words) by the "brevity mania", was methodically cutting the text down in size (the last bout of such activity lasted from 1951 to the early 1953). Among the fragments cut were one lengthy description of a "Belshazzar feast" on board the Atlantida ship and a Tolstoyan monologue which the author deemed, apparently, too straightforward in its condemnation of the main character's way of life.

== Synopsis ==
A 58-year-old American from San Francisco, having acquired a great fortune, sets off with his wife and daughter on a world tour. After a luxurious cruise, they arrive in Naples, where he is dismayed by the unusually bad winter weather and finds that the city does not meet his expectations. They then go to Capri, where he abruptly dies in the lobby of his fancy hotel, causing a stir among the rich clientele. The second half of the story is concerned with the change in the once-deferential staff's attitude towards the gentleman, and in the dehumanizing way in which his body is treated as it makes its journey out of Italy.

== Critical reception ==
Upon its release the story was widely discussed and generally praised in the Russian press. According to critic Abram Derman, after Chekhov and Tolstoy's respective deaths nothing worthy of notice appeared in the Russian literature at all, up until "The Gentleman from San Francisco" release. "Bunin has developed greatly as an artist over the last few years, mainly by widening enormously his emotional scope. There is not a shade of irritation in his dislike of the American gentleman; his antipathy is embracingly wide, to a huge creative effect. With solemn, saintly sadness the author created one massive portrait of the global evil; the vast landscape of general sinfulness in which a proud modern man with an old heart habitates. And for the reader – the author's coldness towards his character feels not only well justified and logical, but very beautiful," Derman wrote in 1916. He found most remarkable the style of the story too, speaking of "rhythmic metallic beat of flawless, loaded phrases reminding... rhythms of resonating bells; richness and chastity of language where there's not a single word that would be either missing or superfluous."

More cautious was the Russkoye Bogatstvo magazine review. "The story is strong but it suffers from what the French call "its own virtues". The counterpoint between the outward gloss of the modern culture and its trifle insignificance in the face of death is exploited with gripping power, but the author drains the potential of this conflict down to the bottom, what with the image of the main character – an old American millionaire – being consciously confined to contours of a common stereotype. One cannot indulge with juggling symbols infinitely and get away with it. Symbols, when they are that recognizable, easily turn into schemes. …Both in "Aglaya" and "The Gentleman from San Francisco" a thesis runs at the forefront, psychology's being lost in the rear," wrote the reviewer.

== Sources ==
- Joost, Nicholas and Sullivan, Alvin (1970). D. H. Lawrence and The Dial. Carbondale and Edwardsville: Southern Illinois University Press; London and Amsterdam: Feffer & Simons, Inc.
