= Ekaterina Lopatina =

Russian author

- Екатерина Михайловна Лопатина
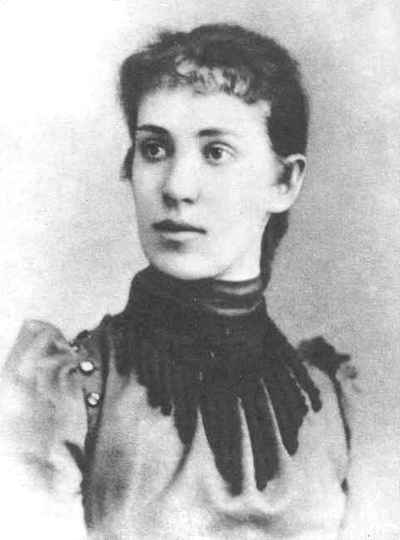

Ekaterina Mikhailovna Lopatina (Russian: Екатерина Михайловна Лопатина; 1865 – 1935) was a Russian writer. Her works were signed with the pen name Katerina Eltsova (rus. Катерина Ельцова). She was a close friend of Russian writer and poet Ivan Bunin.

== Early life ==
Ekaterina Lopatina was born into a noble Russian family. Her father, Mikhail Nikolaevich Lopatin (1823-1900), was a notable Moscow lawyer. Her mother, Ekaterina Lvovna Lopatina (1827-1910), was a sister of a prominent Russian mathematician, Pafnutiy Lvovich Chebyshev (1821-1894).

She had four brothers. Nikolay was a well-known Russian folklorist. Leo became a philosophy professor at Moscow University. Alexander also studied law and was a successful author. Vladimir became a member of the troupe in the Moscow Art Theatre after completing his military service.

== Works ==
- "Recollections about S. A. Yurjev"; in Russian thought, 1891 (rus. «Воспоминания о С. А. Юрьеве»; журнал «Русская мысль», 1891)
- "In alien nest" (under pen name Katerina Eltsova); New time, 1896-1897 (rus. «В чужом гнезде» (под псевдонимом «Катерина Ельцова»), журнал «Новое время», 1896–1897)
