= Mitya's Love =

1925 novel by Ivan Bunin

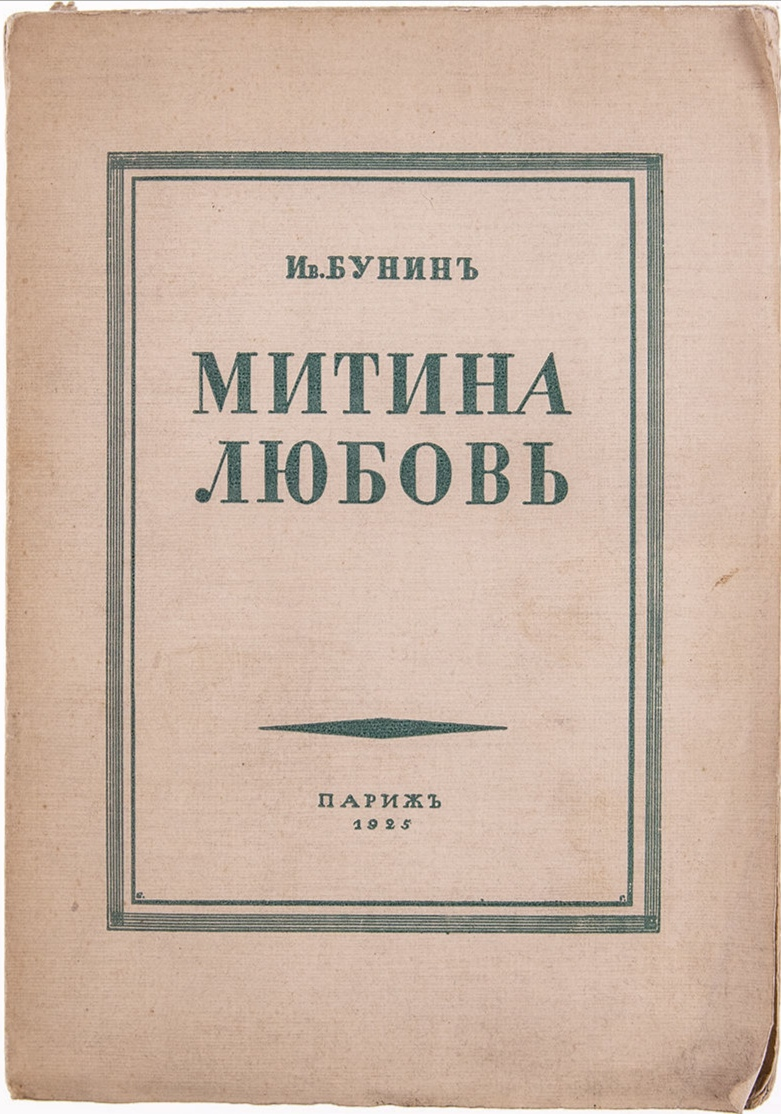
- First edition
- Author: Ivan Bunin
- Original title: Митина любовь
- Language: Russian
- Genre: Novelet
- Publisher: Sovremennye zapiski
- Publication date: 1925
- Publication place: France
- Media type: Print: (hardback ad paperback)
- Preceded by: Rose of Jerico (1924)
- Followed by: Cursed Days (1926)

Mitya's Love (Russian: Митина любовь, Mi'tina Lyubo'v) is a short novel by the Nobel Prize-winning Russian author Ivan Bunin written in 1924 and first published in books XXIII and XXIV of the Sovremennye zapiski, a Paris-based literary journal in 1925. It also featured in (and gave the title to) a compilation of novelets and short stories published the same year in France.

== Background ==
Bunin started working upon Mitya's Love in Grasse in summer 1924. In the course of writing, plot lines were changing continuously. The first version (marked as of June 3, 1924, by Vera Muromtseva) told the story of a "moral fall" of a young man who has been degraded and compromised by a local village counterman. The theme of Mitya's love for Katya appeared later and soon became the major one. Some versions were full of details of country life, Alyonka's proposed marriage and Moscow's bohemian life which Katya fell victim of. Most of these sub-plots were later omitted. Some of the sketches concerning the main character's relations with a village teacher, Ganhka, formed the plot of a short story called "April" (Апрель). Another spin-off was "Rain" (Дождь), a short story which was supposed to reveal in detail the chain of events that led to Petya's (such in this case was the hero's name) suicide. Bunin completed this story on June 7, 1924, then two days later returned to the main work and included the slightly altered version of "Rain" into it. In the final version of the novelet, they form chapters XVIII and XIX. The last of the known versions' manuscript is dated September 27 (o.s. 14), 1924.

In her letters (dated March 8 and September 16, 1959) Vera Muromtseva-Bunina told correspondent N.Smirnov that Mitya's prototype was partly Bunin's nephew Nikolai Pusheshnikov (who had suffered a similar kind of unhappy love affair) partly (and more in terms of general appearance) the latter's brother Petya, a passionate hunter. "As for the title, that summer [1924] a boy named Mitya visited Grasse, rich land-owner's son, quiet, self-conscious and very young Russian aristocrat. Ivan Alekseevich instantly imagined how such a person could have been be tempted into something wrong by a village's starosta - for the simple motive of extorting a bottle of vodka off him, and that was how the novel started."

There were other autobiographical details in the book. The Shakhovskoye was, in fact, Kolontayevka, an estate next to the Bunin's. Galina Kuznetsova in her Grasse Diary remembered, "In the neighbouring Kolontayevka estate, according to Bunin, there was this pine-tree alley which one particular summer was filled with some kind of special jasmine aromas... 'This alley I carried away with me to later put into Mitya's Love and - to such a sad and tragic effect!' I remember him saying."

At least once the novel has been changed without its author's consent. The Lithuanian poet Kostas Korsakas remembered Bunin in a conversation with him relating how an Italian translation altered the finale into something more optimistic, so as "to let young boy instead of killing himself, drive his love home to full realization". Bunin bitterly ridiculed this "lump of official optimism which had been added to his novel by a fascist regime's translator."

== Critical reception ==
Upon its release, the book was generally praised by European critics and writers. The Danish writer and historian of literature Georg Brandes wrote, "I read Mitya’s Love in French and got very excited. I am amazed by the way how subtly the depths of love are being examined and can but express my delight." The French poet and novelist Henri de Régnier held Mitya's Love as equal to best examples of the classical Russian literature. "Bunin's fine book is the work of one of the Russian masters of an old novel - the kind that prospered in those times when Russia was the homeland of Tolstoy and Turgenev... Bunin, for all his peculiarities, belongs to this family of high quality masters", de Régnier wrote. The German poet Rainer Maria Rilke sent a letter to Russkaya Mysl magazine in which he methodically analysed the main character's behaviour and motives. "The beloved Katya, this tender and impressionable Katya for the first time provides him with the outlook close to the unconsciously all-knowing outlook of a wild animal. Once he abandons the one he loves, he has to fill in these infinite immaterial reaches, this heavenly bliss which is quite special, - with a substance of the world he knows and loves. Once he loses Katya, he loses the world with her; left with nothing but a non-being, néant, courageously and logically chooses to die. One infinitesimal measure of curiosity (and I use this lowly concept consciously in this context) aimed at what might have followed this bout of desperation, could have saved him. Problem was, he put his whole world, known and visible, onto this tiny departing boat named 'Katya'... and on this boat the world sailed away from him."

There was some criticism, coming mostly from Russians in Paris. Having read just part one of the book, Vladislav Khodasevich sent a letter to Sovremennye zapisky, arguing that "Bunin is all right when he doesn't fall for his best-loved recipe: 1% The Kreutzer Sonata, 100% pure water". As the Bunin scholar V. Lavrov pointed out, so carried away was the critic with his stream of irony that the fact that the whole totaled up to 101% somehow eluded his attention.

More subtle but even less sympathetic was the reaction of Zinaida Gippius who came up with a cycle of essays entitled "Of Love" intended to be published in the Sovremennye zapisky magazine. Gippius compared Bunin's novel both to Goethes' The Sorrows of Young Werther and the French writer Charles Derennes's novel Gaby My Love. "Mitya as an intelligent being is all but non-existent. He's got hardly more consciousness than the spring-time nature, white cherry trees and breathing depths of Earth he's filled with," she wrote. Gippius found the Alyonka episode totally unbelievable and incompatible with Mitya's feelings for Katya. Bunin, on having read Gippius' essays, as editor Mark Vishnyak remembered, "lost his temper and, in effect, vetoed their publication in Sovremennye zapisky." Two of the Gippius' articles were published in the Poslednye Novosty newspaper in 1925 as "Love and intelligence" (Любовь и мысль, June 18, No.1579) and "Love and Beauty" (Любовь и красота, June 25, No.1585, July 2, 1591).

The writer and historian Pyotr Bitsilli in his article "Notes on Tolstoy. Bunin and Tolstoy" (Sovremennye zapisky, Paris, 1936, Vol. LX, pp. 280–281.) compared Mitya's Love to Leo Tolstoy's "The Devil" and commented on many similarities found. In a letter dated March 17, 1936, Bunin wrote, "Dear Pyotr Mikhailovich, it just so happened that I've never read "The Devil"... And of those fragments in it that resemble [my] description of Mitya and Alyonka's rendez-vous I've learned from your article. How these striking resemblances are to be explained? Very simple. We come from virtually the same place, and the village ways... in our respective estates were very similar. We both, apparently, borrowed some "classic" details related to this 'procurement' thing. For me, this episode of Mitya dating Alyonka as procured by starosta, feels like still life, almost. For such was the story of one of my nephews' 'fall'. I partly borrowed his recount, which, incidentally, had nothing whatsoever tragic about it."

Bitsilli, apparently, was not convinced. In his April 5, 1936, letter, Bunin remarked that some people's suggestion that Mitya's Love was closer to Ivan Turgenev's prose was more realistic. As for Tolstoy's style of writing, there was "not a single note in it that would be in any way similar [to this]", he wrote. "Ethereal, light of touch, modernist and poetic," the book was as far removed from Tolstoy's prose as it could be, Bunin argued.
