= The Village (Bunin novel) =

1910 novella by Ivan Bunin

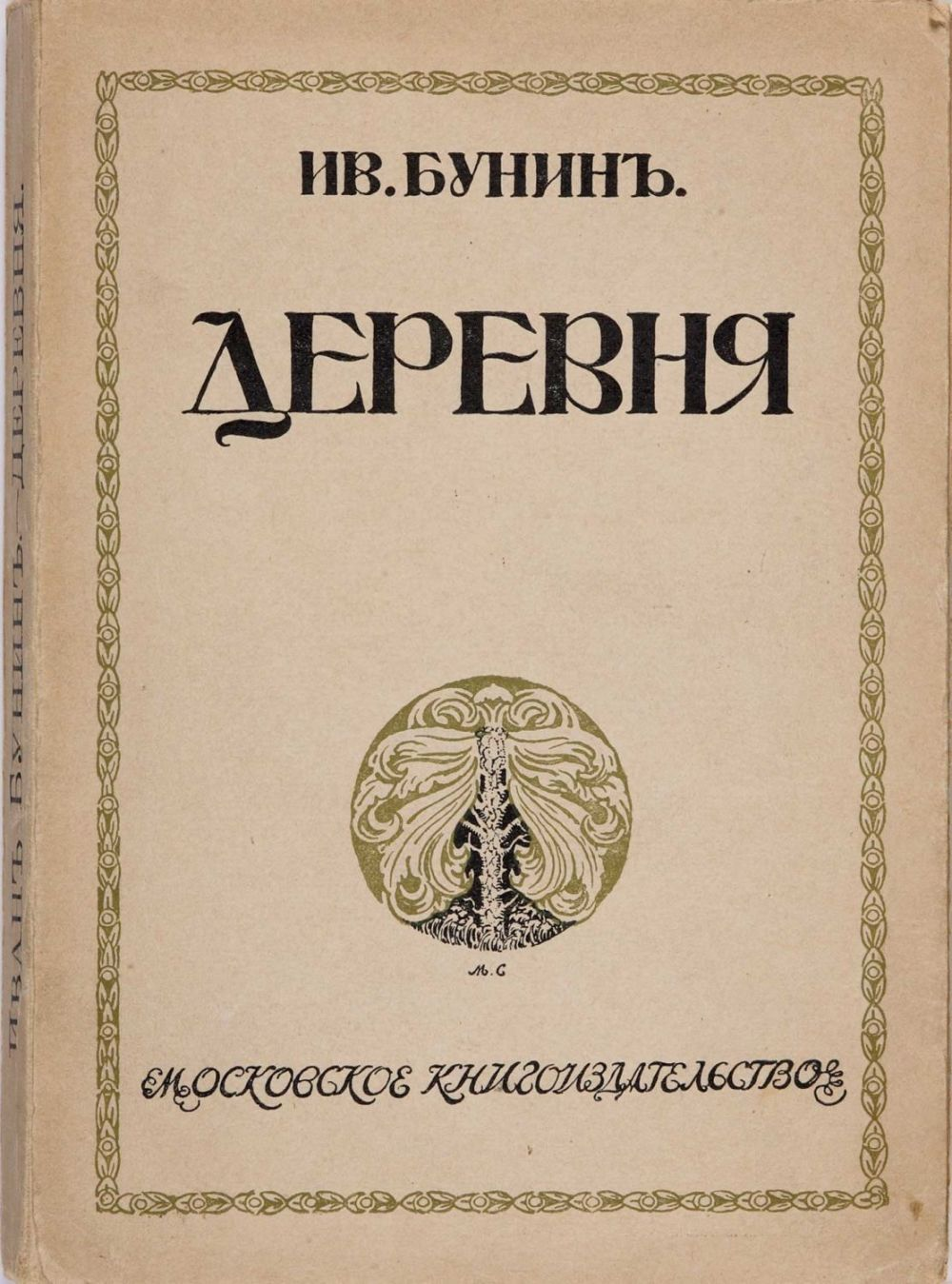
- First edition
- Author: Ivan Bunin
- Original title: Деревня
- Translator: Isabel Florence Hapgood
- Language: Russian
- Publisher: Sovremenny Mir
- Publication date: 1910
- Publication place: Russia
- English publication date: 1923

The Village (Russian: Деревня, romanized: Derévnya) is a short novel by the Nobel Prize-winning Russian author Ivan Bunin, written in 1909 and first published in 1910 by the Saint Petersburg magazine Sovremenny Mir under the title Novelet (Повесть). The Village caused much controversy at the time, though it was highly praised by Maxim Gorky (who from then on regarded the author as the major figure in Russian literature), among others, and is now generally regarded as Bunin's first masterpiece. Composed of brief episodes set in its author's birthplace at the time of the 1905 Revolution, it tells the story of two peasant brothers, one a brute drunk, the other a gentler, more sympathetic character. Bunin's realistic portrayal of the country life jarred with the idealized picture of "unspoiled" peasants which was common for the mainstream Russian literature, and featured the characters deemed 'offensive' by many, which were "so far below the average in terms of intelligence as to be scarcely human."

It was first published in English in 1923, in a translation by Isabel Hapgood.

== History ==
Ivan Bunin completed the first part of The Village in September 1909, in Moscow, working, as his wife Vera Muromtseva attested, with extraordinary intensity. In a letter to Gorky the writer himself spoke of "sleepless nights" and "hands shaking" from nervous exhaustion.

The first part of the novel, "The Morning" (Утро), was premiered as a recital before a Moscow literary circle audience, then appeared in Utro Rossii newspaper (1909, No.34, November 15). On February 10, 1910, Bunin sent the first part to Saint-Petersburg's Sovremenny Mir for it to be published in March, promising the remaining parts for the April issue. But in April he unexpectedly left for North Africa and stayed at Capri, so the publication was postponed.

"What I am now engaged with is the completion of Деревня novelet. Two days will be spent in Moscow, then I'll depart for Orlovskaya gubernia to put all my energy into the work," Bunin told Odessky Novosty correspondent on May 16. These plans were disrupted by the writer's mother's illness and death. It was only after the burial that he returned to the unfinished book. On August 20, 1910 Bunin informed Gorky in a letter:

In Moscow I was working for 15 hours a day, fearing that even a minute's pause might dampen down this electric lamp inside me and again deep sorrow which I've been fighting with by means of hard writing, will crash me down again. This great intensity brought deadly tiredness, then heart attacks, with icy sweat, me almost fainting. As for the novelette itself – I've finished it. And, to my mind, destroyed it – by squeezing everything right from the start into too tight a frame. But then again, it was too difficult for me [to change anything] lately.

On September 2, 1910, the manuscript was sent to Sovremenny Mir and was published in Nos.10 and 11. This second part was tried out at a public recital event at the Moscow Sreda (Wednesday) literary circle on September 19, where, according to Nash Zhurnal magazine, "the audience was deeply impressed."

=== Concept ===
The novel's title had to do with an idea formulated by one of its characters, a local self-styled eccentric named Balashkin. According to the latter, Russia as a whole amounts to one huge Village and "the fate of its wild and poor peasantry is the fate of the country as such." "My novel depicts the life of rural Russia; along with one particular village it is concerned with life of Russia as a whole", Bunin told Odessky Listok newspaper in 1910.

== Critical reception ==
In October, 1909, Birzhevye Vedomosty newspaper's literary critic predicted that "This new thing, ideologically very explicit, will cause controversy and stir up both the left and the right." Indeed, The Village came as a surprise for many, especially for Marxist critics. "Who could have thought that this refined poet... [singer] of all things exotic and 'otherworldly'... would create such an ultra-real, Earth-smelling piece of truly rough literature", Vatslav Vorovsky wrote.

Literary critics from both the left and the right were unanimous in one verdict: "peasantry in Bunin's novel was painted by one brush: black." "Poignant hopelessness is what this gloomy tapestry emanates; pessimism and even negativity is what is felt in every stroke of the painter's brush", wrote an Odessky Novosty critic (signed N.G.) on October 13. "Each and every page of it cries out something about how vile and ugly the Russian muzhik is, to what extent the Russian peasantry is degraded," agreed L. Voitolovsky of Kiyevskaya Mysl, arguing that not a trace of light could be found there, that could be seen as present in Russian rural life-related works of Anton Chekhov, Ivan Turgenev, Gleb Uspensky and Fyodor Reshetnikov. "Bunin's pattern is monochromatic and monotonous, always slightly tendentious," wrote Yelena Koltonovskaya in 1912.

By all this Bunin wasn't impressed. "Read some of what's been written. Both praises and put-downs are so utterly banal and flat," he wrote Gorky. The latter replied: "I know for sure that when this astonishment is over […] serious people will rightly say: Деревня, besides having all these artistic merits, became this first impulse that made our broken Russian society to think seriously – not of muzhik or of common people, but of Russia as a whole; it poised the question: is Russia to be or not to be?"

Contemporary critics picked at the novel's density which was unusual for Ivan Bunin's prose which up until then was placid and classicist in tone and form. According to Gorky, "if one single weakness should be pointed out, it might be summed up by one word: "density". Too much material. Each page resembles a museum." Preparing the first edition of Complete Bunin publication, the author edited the original text heavily in order to make it more 'spacious'. He went on doing this over the years. Boris Zaitsev remembered that even after having been given the Nobel Prize, Bunin continued to re-write parts of Деревня, expressing dissatisfaction with his own work in rather strong terms.

"What he did before [The Village] was tell of things that happened yesterday, things that warranted some kind of retrospect assessment – and all those things bore a kind of elegiac shade of reminiscence that was so dear to his heart", Soviet poet and critic Alexander Tvardovsky wrote. This new work was totally different. According to Tvardovsky, Bunin shared his character Balashkins's views on rural Russia's degradation as fatal in terms of the country's future history. "The utter gloominess of this short novel in retrospect could be seen as a kind of mental preparation towards breaking up with his Motherland that followed years later," the critic argued.
