= Ivan Bunin =

Russian author (1870–1953)

- Иван Бунин
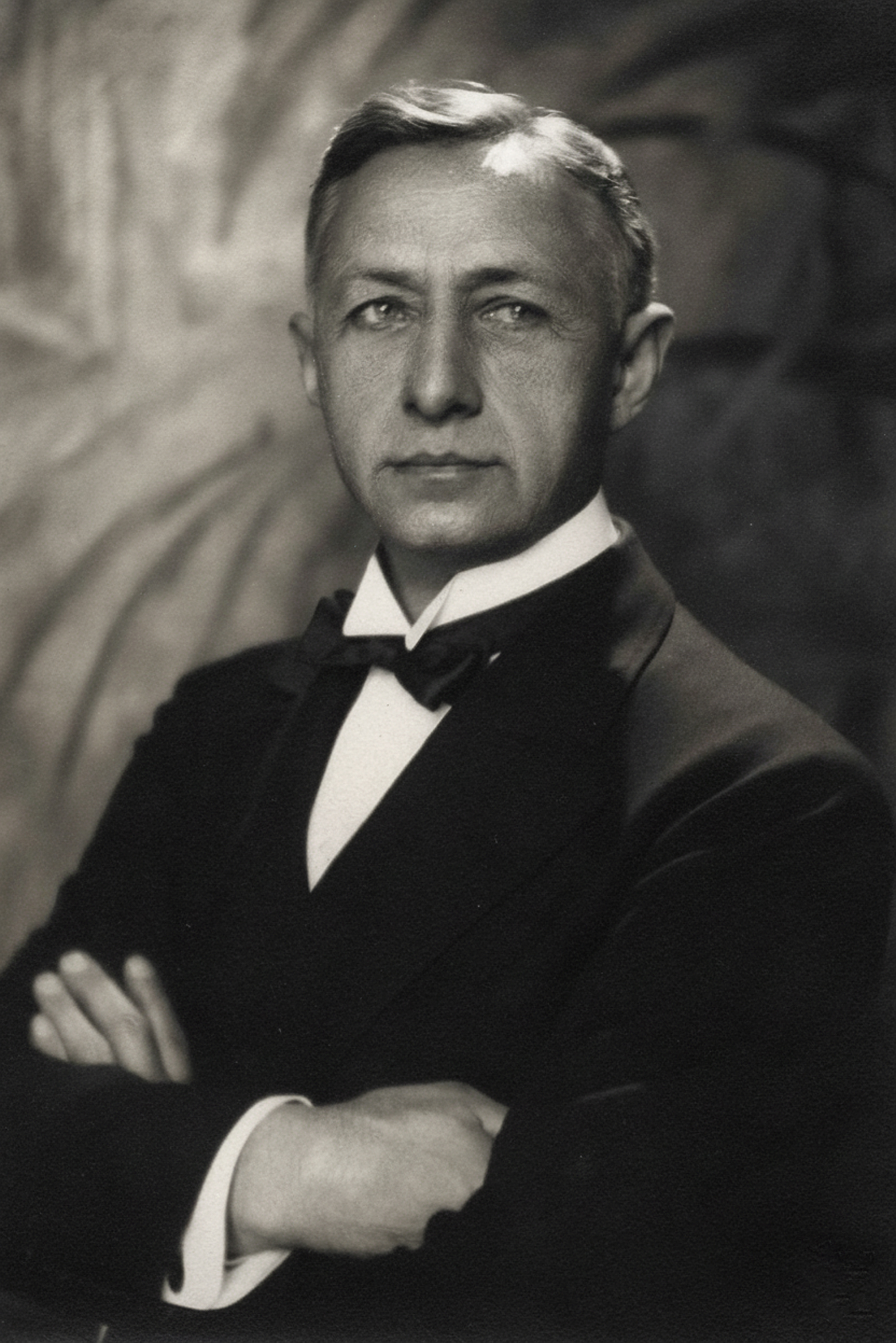
- Bunin in 1928
- Born: 22 October 1870; Voronezh, Russia
- Died: 8 November 1953 (aged 83); Paris, France
- Writing career
- Genres: Fiction, poetry, memoirs, criticism, translations
- Notable awards: Nobel Prize in Literature; 1933; Pushkin Prize; 1903, 1909
- Ivan Bunin's voice Ivan Bunin is reading his poem "Jericho". Recorded in 1908

Ivan Alekseyevich Bunin (/ˈbuːniːn/ BOO-neen; alternatively: /ˈbuːnɪn/ BOO-nin; Russian: Иван Алексеевич Бунин, IPA: [ɪˈvan‿əlʲɪkˈsʲejɪvʲɪdʑ‿ˈbunʲɪn]; 22 October [O.S. 10 October] 1870 – 8 November 1953) was a Russian writer. He became the first Russian writer awarded the Nobel Prize in Literature, in 1933. He carried on the classical Russian traditions in the writing of prose and poetry. The texture of his poems and stories, sometimes referred to as "Bunin brocade", is considered to be one of the richest in the language.

Best known for his short novels The Village (1910) and Dry Valley (1912), autobiographical novel The Life of Arseniev (1933, 1939), short stories collection Dark Avenues (1946) and 1917–1918 diary Cursed Days (1926), Bunin was a revered figure among Russian émigrés, European critics, and many of his fellow writers, who viewed him as an heir to the tradition of realism in Russian literature established by Tolstoy and Chekhov.

== Biography ==
=== Early life ===
Ivan Bunin was born on his parental estate in Voronezh, the third and youngest son of Aleksey Nikolayevich Bunin (1827–1906) and Lyudmila Aleksandrovna Bunina (née Chubarova, 1835–1910). He had two younger sisters: Masha (Maria Bunina-Laskarzhevskaya, 1873–1930) and Nadya (who later died very young) and two elder brothers, Yuly and Yevgeny. Having come from a long line of Russian nobility, Bunin was especially proud that poets Anna Bunina (1774–1829) and Vasily Zhukovsky (1783–1852) were among his ancestors. He wrote in his 1952 autobiography:

I come from an old and noble house that has given Russia a good many illustrious persons in politics as well as in the arts, among whom two poets of the early nineteenth century stand out in particular: Anna Búnina and Vasíly Zhukovsky, one of the great names in Russian literature, the son of Athanase Bunin and the Turk Salma.

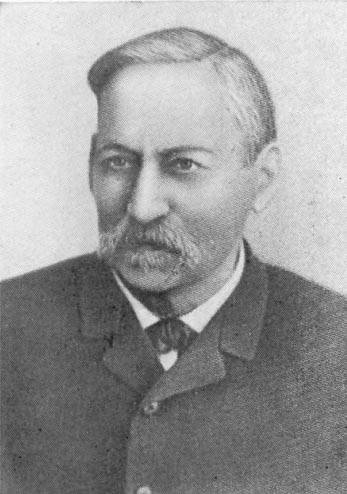
Alexey Nikolayevich Bunin

"The Bunins are descended from Simeon Bunkovsky, a nobleman who came from Poland to the court of the Great Prince Vasily Vasilyevich," he wrote in 1915, quoting the Russian gentry's Armorial Book. According to Bunin, his mother's family, the Chubarovs, "knew very little about themselves except that their ancestors were landowners in Kostromskaya, Moskovskaya, Orlovskya and Tambovskaya Guberniyas". "As for me, from early childhood I was such a libertine as to be totally indifferent both to my own 'high blood' and to the loss of whatever might have been connected to it," he added.

Ivan Bunin's early childhood, spent in Butyrky khutor and later in Ozerky (of Yelets county, Lipetskaya Oblast), was a happy one: the boy was surrounded by intelligent and loving people. Father Alexei Nikolayevich was described by Bunin as a very strong man, both physically and mentally, quick-tempered and addicted to gambling, impulsive and generous, eloquent in a theatrical fashion and totally illogical. "Before the Crimean War he'd never even known the taste of wine, on return he became a heavy drinker, although never a typical alcoholic," he wrote. His mother Lyudmila Alexandrovna's character was much more subtle and tender: this Bunin attributed to the fact that "her father spent years in Warsaw where he acquired certain European tastes which made him quite different from fellow local land-owners." It was Lyudmila Alexandrovna who introduced her son to the world of Russian folklore. His elder brothers Yuly and Yevgeny showed great interest in mathematics and painting respectively, his mother said later, yet, in their mother's words, "Vanya has been different from the moment of birth... none of the others had a soul like his."

Young Bunin's susceptibility and keenness to the nuances of nature were extraordinary. "The quality of my vision was such that I've seen all seven of the stars of the Pleiades, heard a marmot's whistle a verst away, and could get drunk from the smells of a lily of the valley or an old book," he remembered later. Bunin's experiences of rural life had a profound impact on his writing. "There, amidst the deep silence of vast fields, among cornfields – or, in winter, huge snowdrifts which were stepping up to our very doorsteps – I spent my childhood which was full of melancholic poetry," Bunin later wrote of his Ozerky days.

Ivan Bunin's first home tutor was an ex-student named Romashkov, whom he later described as a "positively bizarre character," a wanderer full of fascinating stories, "always thought-provoking even if not altogether comprehensible." Later it was university-educated Yuly Bunin (deported home for being a Narodnik activist) who taught his younger brother psychology, philosophy and the social sciences as part of his private, domestic education. It was Yuly who encouraged Ivan to read the Russian classics and to write himself. Until 1920, Yuly (who once described Ivan as "undeveloped yet gifted and capable of original independent thought") was the latter's closest friend and mentor. "I had a passion for painting, which, I think, shows in my writings. I wrote both poetry and prose fairly early and my works were also published from an early date," wrote Bunin in his short autobiography.

By the end of the 1870s, the Bunins, plagued by the gambling habits of the head of the family, had lost most of their wealth. In 1881 Ivan was sent to a public school in Yelets, but never completed the course: he was expelled in March 1886 for failing to return to the school after the Christmas holidays due to the family's financial difficulties.

=== Literary career ===
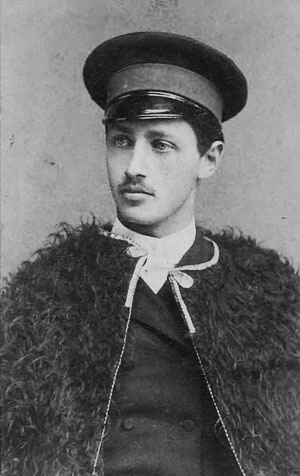
Bunin in 1891

In May 1887, Bunin published "Village Paupers" (Деревенские нищие) in the Saint Petersburg literary magazine Rodina ('Motherland'), his first poem. In 1891, his first short story "Country Sketch (Деревенский эскиз) appeared in the Nikolay Mikhaylovsky-edited journal Russkoye Bogatstvo. In the spring of 1889, Bunin followed his brother to Kharkov, where he became a government clerk, then an assistant editor of a local paper, librarian, and court statistician. In January 1889, he moved to Oryol to work on the local Orlovsky Vestnik newspaper, first as an editorial assistant and later as de facto editor; this enabled him to publish his short stories, poems and reviews in the paper's literary section. There he met Varvara Pashchenko and fell passionately in love with her. In August 1892, the couple moved to Poltava and settled in the home of Yuly Bunin. The latter helped his younger brother to find a job in the local zemstvo administration.

Ivan Bunin's debut book of poetry Poems. 1887–1891 was published in 1891 in Oryol. Some of his articles, essays and short stories, published earlier in local papers, began to feature in the Saint Petersburg periodicals.

Bunin spent the first half of 1894 travelling all over Ukraine. "Those were the times when I fell in love with Malorossiya (Little Russia), its villages and steppes, was eagerly meeting its people and listening to Ukrainian songs, this country's very soul," he later wrote.

In 1895, Bunin visited the Russian capital for the first time. There he was to meet the Narodniks Nikolay Mikhaylovsky and Sergey Krivenko, Anton Chekhov (with whom he began a correspondence and became close friends), Alexander Ertel, and the poets Konstantin Balmont and Valery Bryusov.

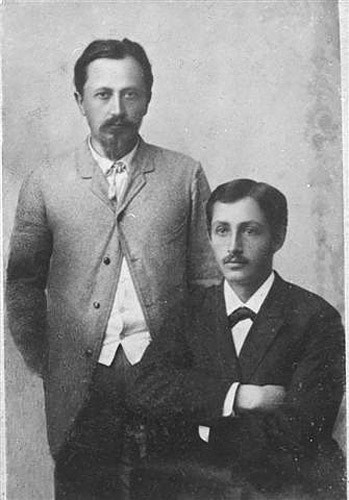
Ivan Bunin with his brother Yuly

1899 saw the beginning of Bunin's friendship with Maxim Gorky, to whom he dedicated his Falling Leaves (1901) collection of poetry and whom he later visited at Capri. Bunin became involved with Gorky's Znanie (Knowledge) group. Another influence and inspiration was Leo Tolstoy whom he met in Moscow in January 1894. Admittedly infatuated with the latter's prose, Bunin tried desperately to follow the great man's lifestyle too, visiting sectarian settlements and doing a lot of hard work. He was even sentenced to three months in prison for illegally distributing Tolstoyan literature in the autumn of 1894, but avoided jail due to a general amnesty proclaimed on the occasion of the succession to the throne of Nicholas II. Tellingly, it was Tolstoy himself who discouraged Bunin from slipping into what he called "total peasantification." Several years later, while still admiring Tolstoy's prose, Bunin changed his views regarding his philosophy which he now saw as utopian.

In 1895–1896, Bunin divided his time between Moscow and Saint Petersburg. In 1897, his first short story collection To the Edge of the World and Other Stories came out, followed a year later by In the Open Air (Под открытым небом, 1898), his second book of verse. In June 1898, Bunin moved to Odessa. Here he became close to the Southern Russia Painters Comradeship, became friends with Yevgeny Bukovetski and Pyotr Nilus. In the winter of 1899–1900, he began attending the Sreda ('Wednesday') literary group in Moscow, striking up a friendship with Nikolay Teleshov, among others. Here the young writer made himself a reputation as an uncompromising advocate of the realistic traditions of classic Russian literature. "Bunin made everybody uncomfortable. Having got this severe and sharp eye for real art, feeling acutely the power of a word, he was full of hatred towards every kind of artistic excess. In times when (quoting Andrey Bely) "throwing pineapples to the sky" was the order of the day, Bunin's very presence made words stick in people's throats," Boris Zaitsev later remembered. He met Anton Chekov in 1896, and a strong friendship ensued.

=== 1900–1909 ===
The collections Poems and Stories (1900) and Flowers of the Field (1901) were followed by Falling Leaves (Листопад, 1901), Bunin's third book of poetry (including a large poem of the same title first published in the October 1900 issue of Zhizn ('Life') magazine). It was welcomed by both critics and colleagues, among them Alexander Ertel, Alexander Blok and Aleksandr Kuprin, who praised its "rare subtlety." Even though the book testifies to his association with the Symbolists, primarily Valery Bryusov, at the time many saw it as an antidote to the pretentiousness of 'decadent' poetry which was then popular in Russia. Falling Leaves was "definitely Pushkin-like", full of "inner poise, sophistication, clarity and wholesomeness," according to critic Korney Chukovsky. Soon after the book's release, Gorky called Bunin (in a letter to Valery Bryusov) "the first poet of our times." It was for Falling Leaves (along with the translation of Henry Wadsworth Longfellow's The Song of Hiawatha, 1898) that Bunin was awarded his first Pushkin Prize. Bunin justified a pause of two years in the early 1900s by the need for "inner growth" and spiritual change.

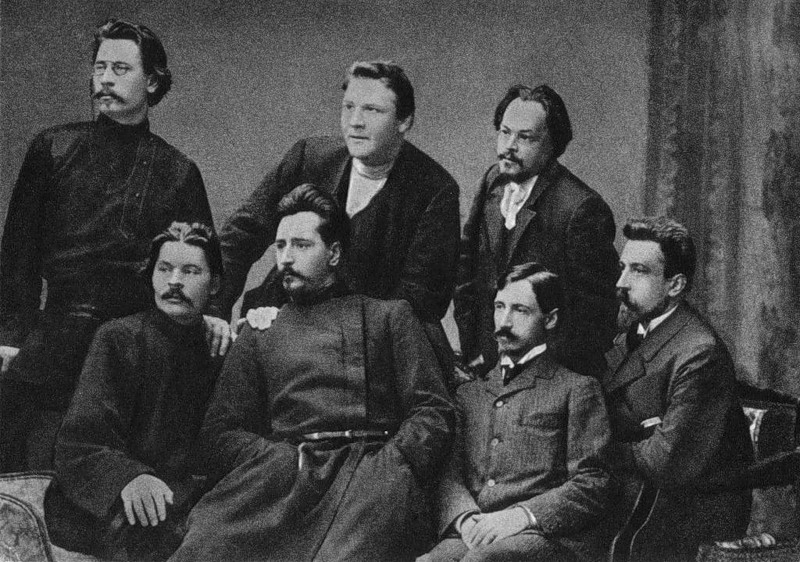
Bunin (bottom row, second from right), with fellow members of the Moscow literary group Sreda. From top left: Stepan Skitalets, Feodor Chaliapin and Yevgeny Chirikov; from bottom left: Maxim Gorky, Leonid Andreyev, Ivan Bunin, and Nikolay Teleshov. 1902

At the turn of the century Bunin made a major switch from poetry to prose which started to change both in form and texture, becoming richer in lexicon, more compact and perfectly poised. Citing Gustave Flaubert, whose work he admired, as an influence, Bunin was "demonstrating that prose could be driven by poetic rhythms, but still remain prose." According to the writer's nephew Pusheshnikov, Bunin once told him: "Apparently I was born a versemaker... like Turgenev, who was a versemaker, first and foremost. Finding the true rhythm of the story was for him the main thing – everything else was supplementary. And for me the crucial thing is to find the proper rhythm. Once it's there, everything else comes in spontaneously, and I know when the story is done."

In 1900, the novella Antonov Apples (Антоновские яблоки) was published; later it was included in textbooks and is regarded as Bunin's first real masterpiece, but it was criticised at the time as too nostalgic and elitist, allegedly idealising "the Russian nobleman's past." Other acclaimed novellas of this period, On the Farm, The News from Home, and To the Edge of the World (На край света), showing a penchant for extreme precision of language, delicate description of nature and detailed psychological analysis, made him a popular and well-respected young author.

In 1902, Znanie started publishing the Complete Bunin series; five volumes appeared by the year 1909. Three books, Poems (1903), Poems (1903–1906) and Poems of 1907 (the latter published by Znanie in 1908), formed the basis of a special (non-numbered) volume of the Complete series which in 1910 was published in Saint Petersburg as Volume VI. Poems and Stories (1907–1909) by the Obschestvennaya Polza ('Public Benefit') publishing house. Bunin's works featured regularly in Znanie's literary compilations; beginning with Book I, where "Black Earth" appeared along with several poems, all in all he contributed to 16 books of the series.

In the early 1900s, Bunin travelled extensively. He was a close friend of Chekhov and his family and continued visiting them regularly until 1904. The October social turmoil of 1905 found Bunin in Yalta, Crimea, from where he moved back to Odessa. Scenes of "class struggle" there did not impress the writer, for he saw them as little more than the Russian common people's craving for anarchy and destruction.

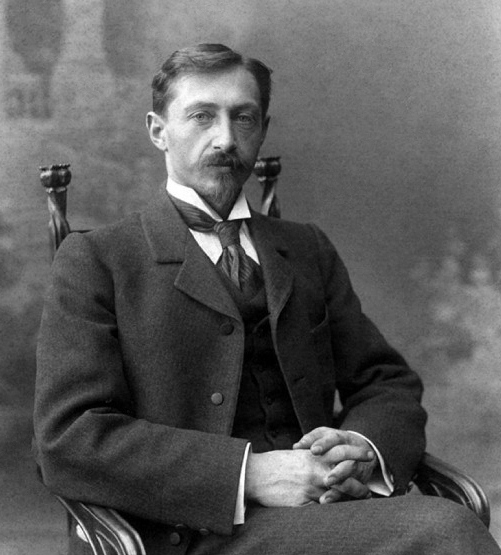
Bunin in 1901

In November 1906, Bunin's passionate affair with Vera Muromtseva began. The girl's family was unimpressed with Bunin's position as a writer, but the couple defied social convention, moving in together and in April 1907 leaving Russia for an extended tour through Egypt and Palestine. The Bird's Shadow (Тень птицы, 1907–1911) collection (published as a separate book in 1931 in Paris) came as a result of this voyage. These travelling sketches were to change the critics' assessment of Bunin's work. Before them Bunin was mostly regarded as (using his own words) "a melancholy lyricist, singing hymns to noblemen's estates and idylls of the past." In the late 1900s critics started to pay more notice to the colourfulness and dynamics of his poetry and prose. "In terms of artistic precision he has no equal among Russian poets," Vestnik Evropy wrote at the time. Bunin attributed much importance to his travels, counting himself among that special "type of people who tend to feel strongest for alien times and cultures rather than those of their own" and admitting to being drawn to "all the necropolises of the world." Besides, foreign voyages had, admittedly, an eye-opening effect on the writer, helping him to see Russian reality more objectively. In the early 1910s, Bunin produced several famous novellas which came as a direct result of this change in perspective.

In October 1909, Bunin received his second Pushkin Prize for Poems 1903–1906 and translations of (Lord Byron's Cain, and parts of Longfellow's The Golden Legend). He was elected a member of the Russian Academy the same year. In Bunin, The Academy crowns "not a daring innovator, not an adventurous searcher but arguably the last gifted pupil of talented teachers who's kept and preserved... all the most beautiful testaments of their school," wrote critic Aleksander Izmailov, formulating the conventional view of the time. It was much later that Bunin was proclaimed one of the most innovative Russian writers of the century.

=== 1910–1920 ===
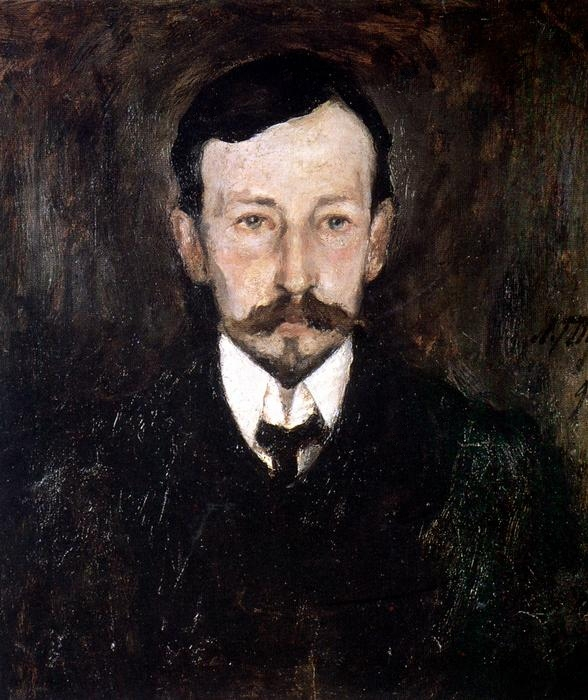
Portrait of Ivan Bunin by Leonard Turzhansky, 1905

In 1910, Bunin published The Village (Деревня), a bleak portrayal of Russian country life, which he depicted as full of stupidity, brutality, and violence. This book caused controversy and made him famous. Its harsh realism (with "characters having sunk so far below the average level of intelligence as to be scarcely human") prompted Maxim Gorky to call Bunin "the best Russian writer of the day."

"I've left behind my "narodnicism" which didn't last very long, my Tolstoyism too and now I'm closer to the social democrats, but I still stay away from political parties," Bunin wrote in the early 1910s. He said he realised now that the working class had become a force powerful enough to "overcome the whole of Western Europe," but warned against the possible negative effect of the Russian workers' lack of organisation, the one thing that made them different from their Western counterparts. He criticised the Russian intelligentsia for being ignorant of the common people's life, and spoke of a tragic schism between "the cultured people and the uncultured masses."

In December 1910, Bunin and Muromtseva made another journey to the Middle East, then visited Ceylon; this four-month trip inspired such stories as "Brothers" (Братья) and "The Tsar of Tsars City" (Город царя царей). On his return to Odessa in April 1911, Bunin wrote "Waters Aplenty" (Воды многие), a travel diary, much lauded after its publication in 1926. In 1912, the novel Dry Valley (Суходол) came out, his second major piece of semi-autobiographical fiction, concerning the dire state of the Russian rural community. Again it left the literary critics divided: social democrats praised its stark honesty, many others were appalled with the author's negativism.

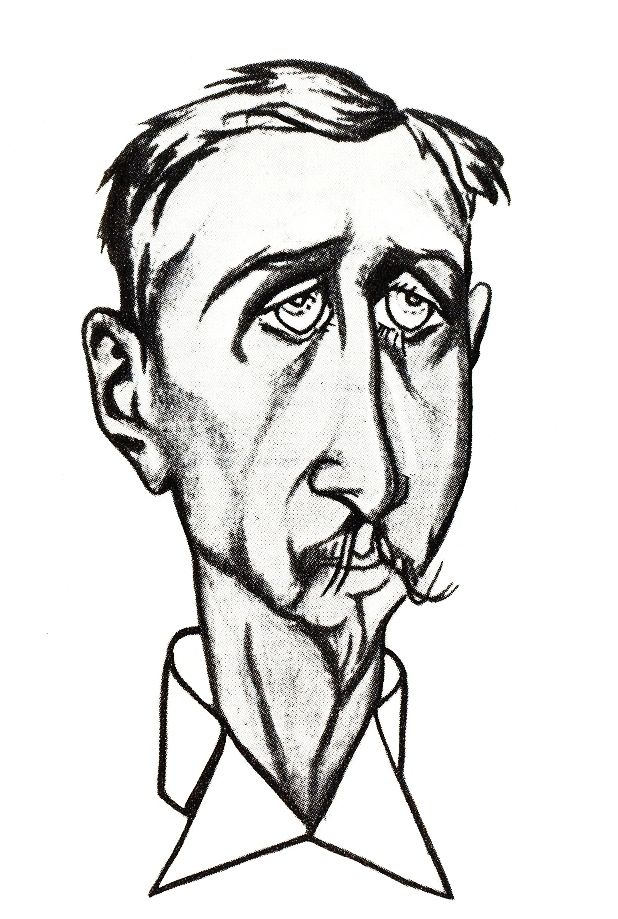
Bunin by Viktor Deni, 1912

Bunin and Muromtseva spent three winters (1912–1914) with Gorky on the island of Capri, where they met with Fyodor Shalyapin and Leonid Andreev, among others. In Russia the couple divided their time mainly between Moscow and a Bunin family estate at Glotovo village nearby Oryol; it was there that they spent the first couple years of World War I. Dogged by anxieties concerning Russia's future, Bunin was still working hard. In the winter of 1914–1915 he finished a new volume of prose and verse entitled The Chalice of Life (Чаша жизни), published in early 1915, to wide acclaim (including high praise from the French poet Rene Ghil). The same year saw the publication of The Gentleman from San Francisco (Господин из Сан-Франциско), arguably the best-known of Bunin's short stories, which was translated into English by D. H. Lawrence. Bunin was a productive translator himself. After Longfellow's The Song of Hiawatha (1898), he did translations of Byron, Tennyson, Musset and François Coppée.

During the war years, Bunin completed the preparation of a six-volume edition of his Collected Works, which was published by Adolph Marks in 1915. Throughout this time Bunin kept aloof from contemporary literary debates. "I did not belong to any literary school; I was neither a decadent, nor a symbolist nor a romantic, nor a naturalist. Of literary circles I frequented only a few," he commented later. By the spring of 1916, overcome by pessimism, Bunin all but stopped writing, complaining to his nephew, N.A. Pusheshnikov, of how insignificant he felt as a writer and how depressed he was for being unable to do more than be horrified at the millions of deaths being caused by the War.

In May 1917 the Bunins moved to Glotovo and stayed there until autumn. In October the couple returned to Moscow to stay with Vera's parents. Life in the city was dangerous (residents had to guard their own homes, maintaining nightly vigils) but Bunin still visited publishers and took part in the meetings of the Sreda and The Art circles. While dismissive of Ivan Goremykin, the prime minister of Russia from 1914 to 1916, he criticised opposition figures like Pavel Milyukov as "false defenders of the Russian people". In April 1917, he severed all ties with the pro-revolutionary Gorky, causing a rift which would never be healed. On 21 May 1918, Bunin and Muromtseva obtained the official permission to leave Moscow for Kiev, then continued their journey through to Odessa. By 1919, Bunin was working for the Volunteer Army as the editor of the cultural section of the anti-Bolshevik newspaper Iuzhnoe Slovo. On 26 January 1920, the couple boarded the last French ship in Odessa and soon were in Constantinople.

=== Emigration ===
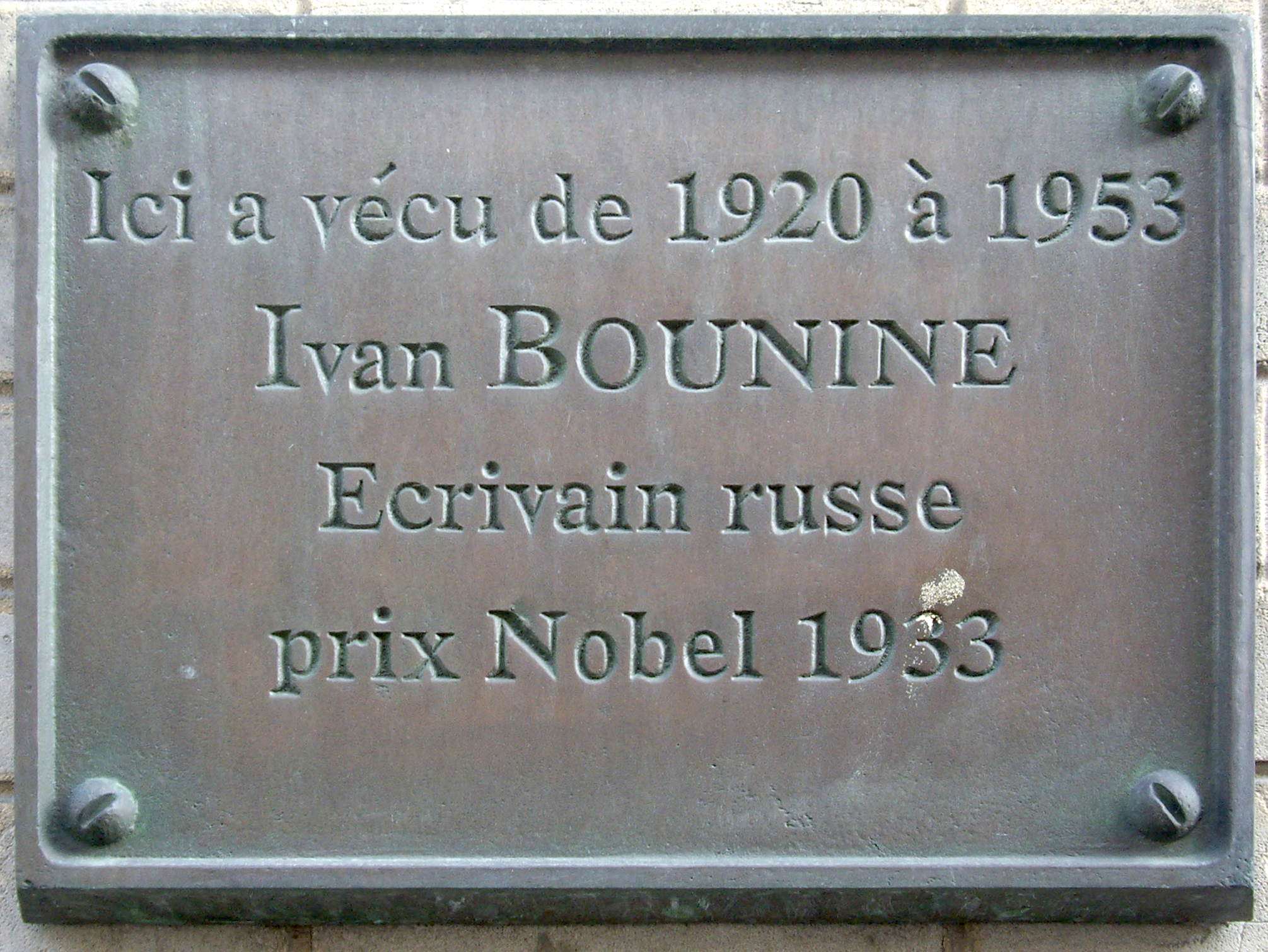
Plaque at Bunin's residence at 1 rue Jacques Offenbach, Paris

On 28 March 1920, after short stints in Sofia and Belgrade, Bunin and Muromtseva arrived in Paris, from then on dividing their time between apartments at 1, rue Jacques Offenbach in the 16th arrondissement of Paris and rented villas in or near Grasse in the Alpes Maritimes. Much as he hated Bolshevism, Bunin never endorsed the idea of foreign intervention in Russia. "It's for a common Russian countryman to sort out his problems for himself, not for foreign masters to come and maintain their new order in our home. I'd rather die in exile than return home with the help of Poland or England. As my father taught me: 'Love your own tub even if it's broken up'", (Note: Russian: Люби свое корыто, даже если оно разбито.) he once said, allegedly, to Merezhkovsky who still cherished hopes for Józef Piłsudski's military success against the Bolshevik regime.

Slowly and painfully, overcoming physical and mental stress, Bunin returned to his usual mode of writing. Scream, his first book published in France, was compiled of short stories written in 1911–1912, years he referred to as the happiest of his life.

In France, Bunin published many of his pre-revolutionary works and collections of original novellas, regularly contributing to the Russian émigré press. According to Vera Muromtseva, her husband often complained of his inability to get used to life in the new world. He said he belonged to "the old world, that of Goncharov and Tolstoy, of Moscow and Saint Petersburg, where his muse had been lost, never to be found again." Yet his new prose was marked with obvious artistic progress: Mitya's Love (Митина любовь, 1924), Sunstroke (Солнечный удаp, 1925), Cornet Yelagin's Case (Дело коpнета Елагина, 1925) and especially The Life of Arseniev (Жизнь Аpсеньева, written in 1927–1929, published in 1930–1933), were praised by critics as bringing Russian literature to new heights. Konstantin Paustovsky called The Life of Arseniev an apex of the whole of Russian prose and "one of the most striking phenomena in the world of literature."

In 1924, he published the "Manifesto of the Russian Emigration", in which he i.a. declared:

There was Russia, inhabited by a mighty family, which had been created by the blessed work of countless generations. ... What was then done to them? They paid for the deposal of the ruler with the destruction of literally the whole home and with unheard of fratricide. ... A bastard, a moral idiot from the birth, Lenin presented to the World at the height of his activities something monstrous, staggering, he discorded the largest country of the Earth and killed millions of people, and in the broad day-light it is being disputed: was he a benefactor of the mankind or not?

In 1925–1926, Cursed Days (Окаянные дни), Bunin's diary of the years 1918–1920, started to appear in the Paris-based Vozrozhdenye newspaper (its final version was published by Petropolis in 1936). According to Bunin scholar Thomas Gaiton Marullo, Cursed Days, one of the very few anti-Bolshevik diaries to be preserved from the time of the Russian Revolution and civil war, linked "Russian anti-utopian writing of the nineteenth century to its counterpart in the twentieth" and, "in its painful exposing of political and social utopias... heralded the anti-utopian writing of George Orwell and Aldous Huxley. Bunin and Zamyatin had correctly understood that the Soviet experiment was destined to self destruct," Marullo wrote.

In the 1920s and 1930s Bunin was regarded as the moral and artistic spokesman for a generation of expatriates who awaited the collapse of Bolshevism, a revered senior figure among living Russian writers, true to the tradition of Tolstoy and Chekhov. He became the first Russian to win the Nobel Prize for Literature, which was awarded to him in 1933 "for following through and developing with chastity and artfulness the traditions of Russian classic prose." Per Halstroem, in his celebratory speech, noted the laureate's poetic gift. Bunin for his part praised the Swedish Academy for honouring a writer in exile. In his speech, addressing the Academy, he said:

Overwhelmed by the congratulations and telegrams that began to flood me, I thought in the solitude and silence of night about the profound meaning in the choice of the Swedish Academy. For the first time since the founding of the Nobel Prize you have awarded it to an exile. Who am I in truth? An exile enjoying the hospitality of France, to whom I likewise owe an eternal debt of gratitude. But, gentlemen of the Academy, let me say that irrespective of my person and my work your choice in itself is a gesture of great beauty. It is necessary that there should be centers of absolute independence in the world. No doubt, all differences of opinion, of philosophical and religious creeds, are represented around this table. But we are united by one truth, the freedom of thought and conscience; to this freedom we owe civilization. For us writers, especially, freedom is a dogma and an axiom. Your choice, gentlemen of the Academy, has proved once more that in Sweden the love of liberty is truly a national cult.

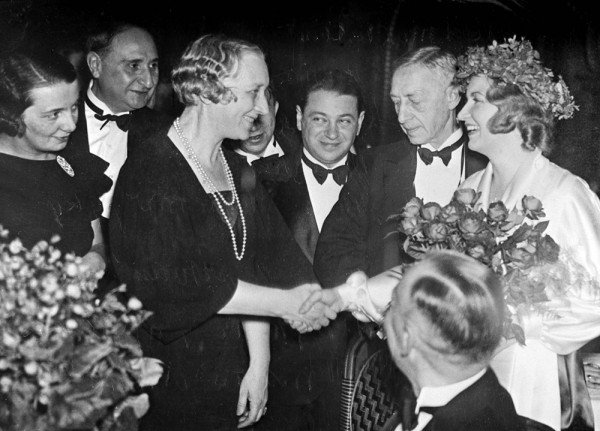
Vera and Ivan Bunin at the Nobel Prize ceremony in Stockholm, 1933

In France, Bunin found himself, for the first time, at the center of public attention. On 10 November 1933, the Paris newspapers came out with huge headlines: "Bunin — the Nobel Prize laureate" giving the whole of the Russian community in France cause for celebration. "You see, up until then we, émigrés, felt like we were at the bottom there. Then all of a sudden our writer received an internationally acclaimed prize! And not for some political scribblings, but for real prose! After having been asked to write a first page column for the Paris Revival newspaper, I stepped out in the middle of the night onto the Place d'Italie and toured the local bistros on my way home, drinking in each and every one of them to the health of Ivan Bunin!" fellow Russian writer Boris Zaitsev wrote. Back in the Soviet Union, the reaction was negative: Bunin's triumph was explained there as "an imperialist intrigue."

Dealing with the Prize, Bunin donated 100,000 francs to a literary charity fund, but the process of money distribution caused controversy among his fellow Russian émigré writers. It was during this time that Bunin's relationship deteriorated with Zinaida Gippius and Dmitry Merezhkovsky (a fellow Nobel Prize nominee who once suggested that they divide the Prize between the two, should one of them get it, and had been refused). Although reluctant to become involved in politics, Bunin was now feted as both a writer and the embodiment of non-Bolshevik Russian values and traditions. His travels throughout Europe featured prominently on the front pages of the Russian émigré press for the remainder of the decade.

In 1934–1936, The Complete Bunin in 11 volumes was published in Berlin by Petropolis. Bunin cited this edition as the most credible one and warned his future publishers against using any other versions of his work rather than those featured in the Petropolis collection. 1936 was marred by an incident in Lindau on the Swiss-German border when Bunin, having completed his European voyage, was stopped and unceremoniously searched. The writer (who caught cold and fell ill after the night spent under arrest) responded by writing a letter to the Paris-based Latest News newspaper. The incident caused disbelief and outrage in France. In 1937 Bunin finished his book The Liberation of Tolstoy (Освобождение Толстого), held in the highest regard by Leo Tolstoy scholars.

In 1938, Bunin began working on what would later become a celebrated cycle of nostalgic stories with a strong erotic undercurrent and a Proustian ring. The first eleven stories of it came out as Dark Avenues (or Dark Alleys, Тёмные аллеи) in New York (1943); the cycle appeared in a full version in 1946 in France. These stories assumed a more abstract and metaphysical tone which has been identified with his need to find refuge from the "nightmarish reality" of Nazi occupation. Bunin's prose became more introspective, which was attributed to "the fact that a Russian is surrounded by enormous, broad and lasting things: the steppes, the sky. In the West everything is cramped and enclosed, and this automatically produces a turning towards the self, inwards."

=== War years ===
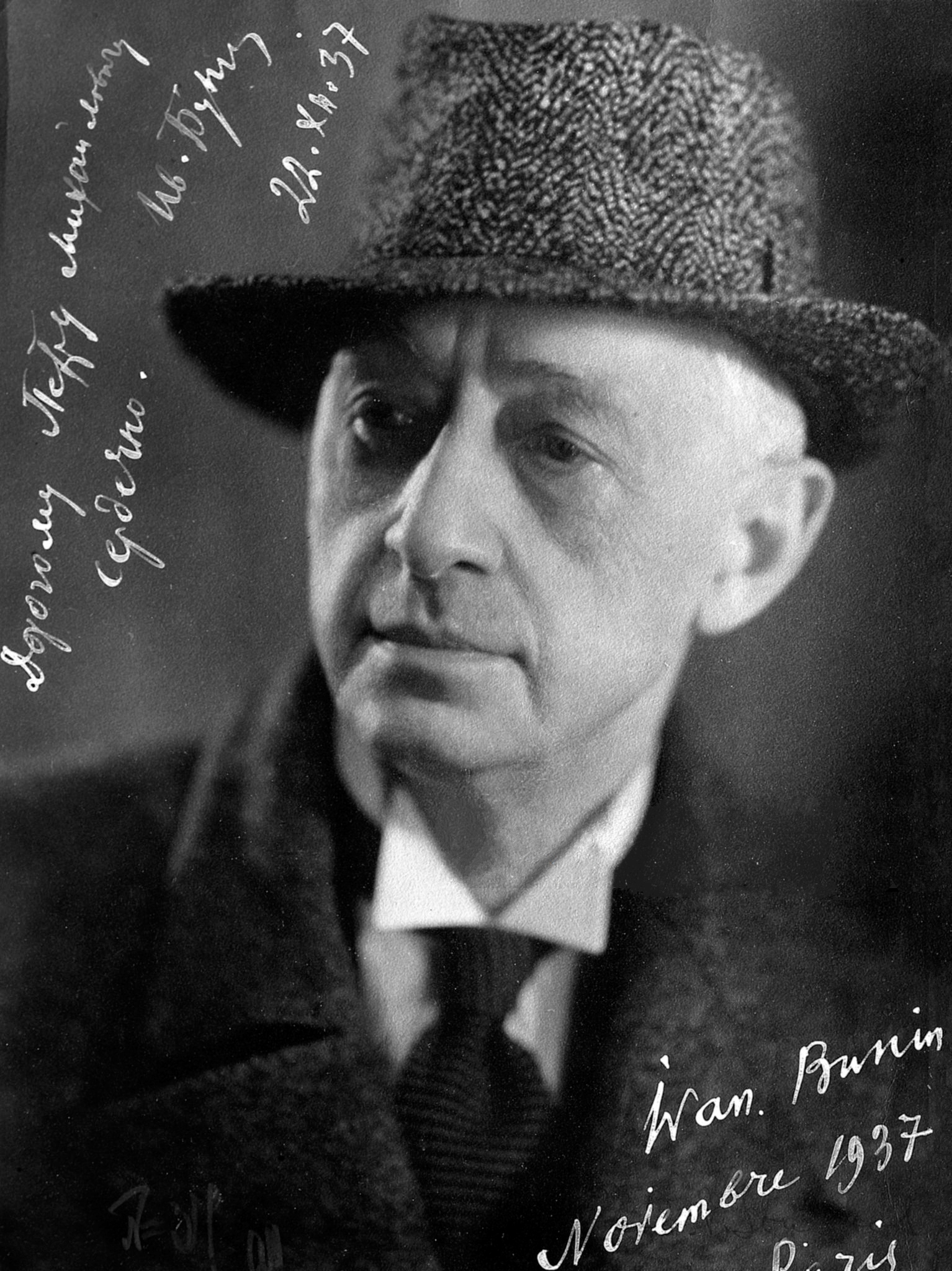
Bunin in 1937

As World War II broke out, Bunin's friends in New York, anxious to help the Nobel Prize laureate get out of France, issued officially-endorsed invitations for him to travel to the US, and in 1941, they received their Nansen passports enabling them to make the trip. But the couple chose to remain in Grasse. They spent the war years at Villa Jeanette, high in the mountains. Two young writers became long-term residents in the Bunin household at the time: Leonid Zurov (1902–1971), who had arrived on a visit from Latvia at Bunin's invitation earlier, in late 1929, and remained with them for the rest of their lives, and Nikolai Roshchin (1896–1956), who returned to the Soviet Union after the war.

Members of this small commune (occasionally joined by Galina Kuznetsova and Margarita Stepun) were bent on survival: they grew vegetables and greens, helping one another out at a time when, according to Zurov, "Grasse's population had eaten all of their cats and dogs". A journalist who visited the Villa in 1942 described Bunin as a "skinny and emaciated man, looking like an ancient patrician". For Bunin, though, this isolation was a blessing and he refused to re-locate to Paris where conditions might have been better. "It takes 30 minutes of climbing to reach our villa, but there's not another view in the whole world like the one that's facing us," he wrote. "Freezing cold, though, is damning and making it impossible for me to write," he complained in one of his letters. Vera Muromtseva-Bunina remembered: "There were five or six of us... and we were all writing continuously. This was the only way for us to bear the unbearable, to overcome hunger, cold and fear."

Ivan Bunin was a staunch anti-Nazi, referring to Adolf Hitler and Benito Mussolini as "rabid monkeys". He risked his life, sheltering fugitives (including Jews such as the pianist A. Liebermann and his wife) in his house in Grasse after Vichy was occupied by the Germans. According to Zurov, Bunin invited some of the Soviet war prisoners ("straight from Gatchina", who worked in occupied Grasse) to his home in the mountains, when the heavily guarded German forces' headquarters were only 300 metres (980 ft) away from his home.

The atmosphere in the neighbourhood, though, was not that deadly, judging by the Bunin's diary entry for 1 August 1944: "Nearby there were two guards, there were also one German, and one Russian prisoner, Kolesnikov, a student. The three of us talked a bit. Saying our farewells, a German guard shook my hand firmly".

Under the occupation, Bunin never ceased writing but, according to Zurov, "published not a single word. He was receiving offers to contribute to newspapers in unoccupied Switzerland, but declined them. Somebody visited him once, a guest who proved to be an agent, and proposed some literary work, but again Ivan Alekseyevich refused." On 24 September 1944, Bunin wrote to Nikolai Roshchin: "Thank God, the Germans fled Grasse without a fight, on August 23. In the early morning of the 24th the Americans came. What was going on in the town, and in our souls, that's beyond description." "For all this hunger, I'm glad we spent the War years in the South, sharing the life and difficulties of the people, I'm glad that we've managed even to help some", Vera Muromtseva-Bunina later wrote.

=== Last years ===
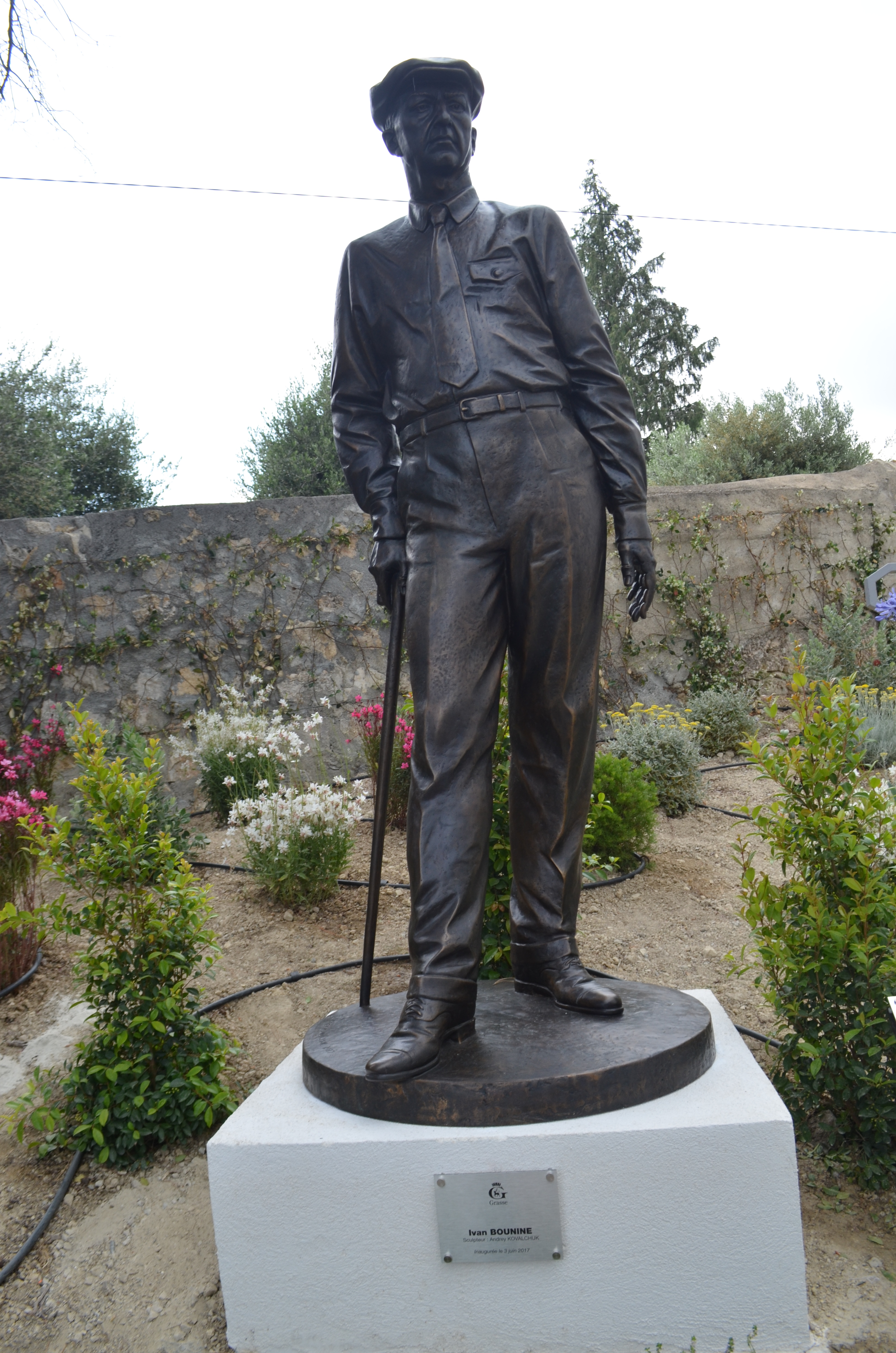
Bunin monument in Grasse

In May 1945, the Bunins returned to 1, rue Jacques Offenbach in Paris. Aside from several spells at the Russian House (a clinic in Juan-les-Pins) where he was convalescing, Bunin stayed in the French capital for the rest of his life. On 15 June, Russkye Novosty newspaper published its correspondent's account of his meeting with an elderly writer who looked "as sprightly and lively as if he had never had to come through those five years of voluntary exile." According to Bunin's friend N. Roshchin, "the liberation of France was a cause of great celebration and exultation for Bunin".

Once, in the audience at a Soviet Russian Theatre show in Paris, Bunin found himself sitting next to a young Red Army colonel. As the latter rose and bowed, saying: "Do I have the honour of sitting next to Ivan Alekseyevich Bunin?" the writer sprang to his feet: "I have the even higher honour of sitting next to an officer of the great Red Army!" he passionately retorted. On 19 June 1945, Bunin held a literary show in Paris where he read some of the Dark Avenue stories. In the autumn of 1945, on the wave of the great patriotic boom, Bunin's 75th birthday was widely celebrated in the Parisian Russian community. Bunin started to communicate closely with the Soviet connoisseurs, journalist Yuri Zhukov and literary agent Boris Mikhailov, the latter receiving from the writer several new stories for proposed publishing in the USSR. Rumours started circulating that the Soviet version of The Complete Bunin was already in the works.

In the late 1940s, Bunin, having become interested in the new Soviet literature, in particular the works of Aleksandr Tvardovsky and Konstantin Paustovsky, entertained plans of returning to the Soviet Union, as Aleksandr Kuprin had done in the 1930s. In 1946, speaking to his Communist counterparts in Paris, Bunin praised the Supreme Soviet's decision to return Soviet citizenship to Russian exiles in France, still stopping short of saying "yes" to the continuous urging from the Soviet side for him to return. "It is hard for an old man to go back to places where he's pranced goat-like in better times. Friends and relatives are all buried... That for me would be a graveyard trip," he reportedly said to Zhukov, promising though, to "think more of it." Financial difficulties and the French reading public's relative indifference to the publication of Dark Avenues figured high among his motives. "Would you mind asking the Union of Writers to send me at least some of the money for books that've been published and re-issued in Moscow in the 1920s and 1930s? I am weak, I am short of breath, I need to go to the South but am too skinny to even dream of it," Bunin wrote to Nikolay Teleshov in a 19 November 1946, letter.

Negotiations for the writer's return came to an end after the publication of his Memoirs (Воспоминания, 1950), full of scathing criticism of Soviet cultural life. Apparently aware of his own negativism, Bunin wrote: "I was born too late. If I had been born earlier, my literary memoirs would have been different. I wouldn't have been a witness to 1905, the First World War, then 1917 and what followed: Lenin, Stalin, Hitler... How can I not be jealous of our forefather Noah. He lived through only one flood in his lifetime". Reportedly, the infamous Zhdanov decree was one of the reasons for Bunin's change of mind. On 15 September 1947, Bunin wrote to Mark Aldanov: "I have a letter here from Teleshov, written on 7 September; 'what a pity (he writes) that you've missed all of this: how your book was set up, how everybody was waiting for you here, in the place where you could have been... rich, feasted, and held in such high honour!' Having read this I spent an hour hair-tearing. Then I suddenly became calm. It just came to me all of a sudden all those other things Zhdanov and Fadeev might have given me instead of feasts, riches and laurels..."

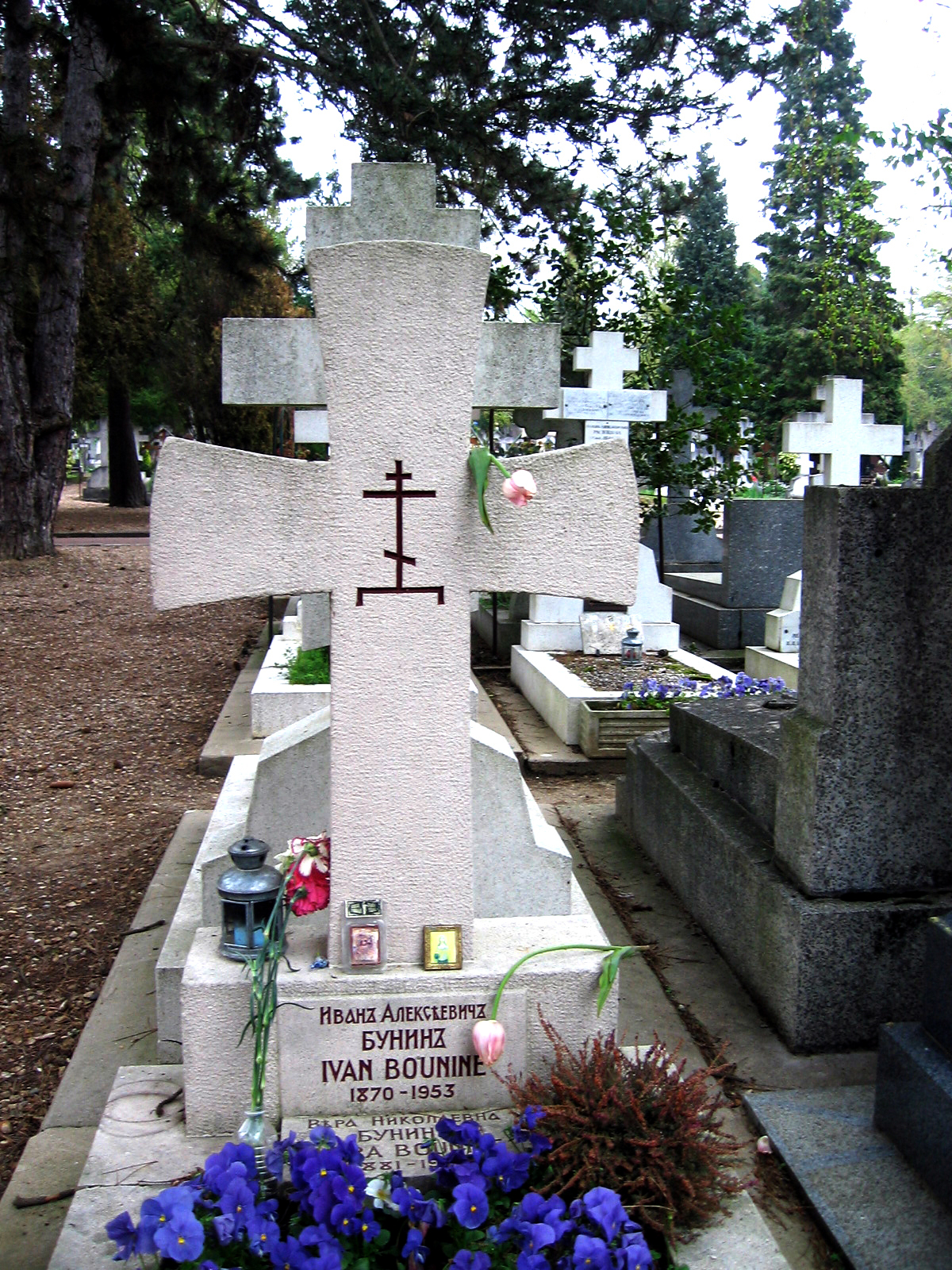
Ivan Bunin's grave, Sainte-Geneviève-des-Bois Russian Cemetery

After 1948, his health deteriorating, Bunin concentrated upon writing memoirs and a book on Anton Chekhov. He was aided by his wife, who, along with Zurov, completed the work after Bunin's death and saw to its publication in New York in 1955. In English translation it was entitled About Chekhov: The Unfinished Symphony. Bunin also revised a number of stories for publication in new collections, spent considerable time looking through his papers and annotated his collected works for a definitive edition. In 1951 Bunin was elected the first ever hononary International PEN member, representing the community of writers in exile. According to A. J. Heywood, one major event of Bunin's last years was his quarrel in 1948 with Maria Tsetlina and Boris Zaitsev, following the decision by the Union of Russian Writers and Journalists in France to expel holders of Soviet passports from its membership. Bunin responded by resigning from the Union. The writer's last years were marred by bitterness, disillusionment and ill-health; he was suffering from asthma, bronchitis and chronic pneumonia.

=== Death ===
On 2 May 1953, Bunin left in his diary a note that proved to be his last one. "Still, this is so dumbfoundingly extraordinary. In a very short while there will be no more of me – and of all the things worldly, of all the affairs and destinies, from then on I will be unaware! And what I'm left to do here is dumbly try to consciously impose upon myself fear and amazement," he wrote.

Ivan Alekseyevich Bunin died in a Paris attic flat in the early hours of 8 November 1953. Heart failure, cardiac asthma and pulmonary sclerosis were cited as the causes of death. A lavish burial service took place at the Russian Church on Rue Daru. All the major newspapers, both Russian and French, published large obituaries. For quite a while the coffin was held in a vault. On 30 January 1954, Bunin was buried in the Sainte-Geneviève-des-Bois Russian Cemetery.

In the 1950s, Bunin became the first of the Russian writers in exile to be published officially in the Soviet Union. In 1965, The Complete Bunin came out in Moscow in nine volumes. Some of his more controversial books, notably Cursed Days, remained banned in the Soviet Union until the late 1980s.

== Legacy ==
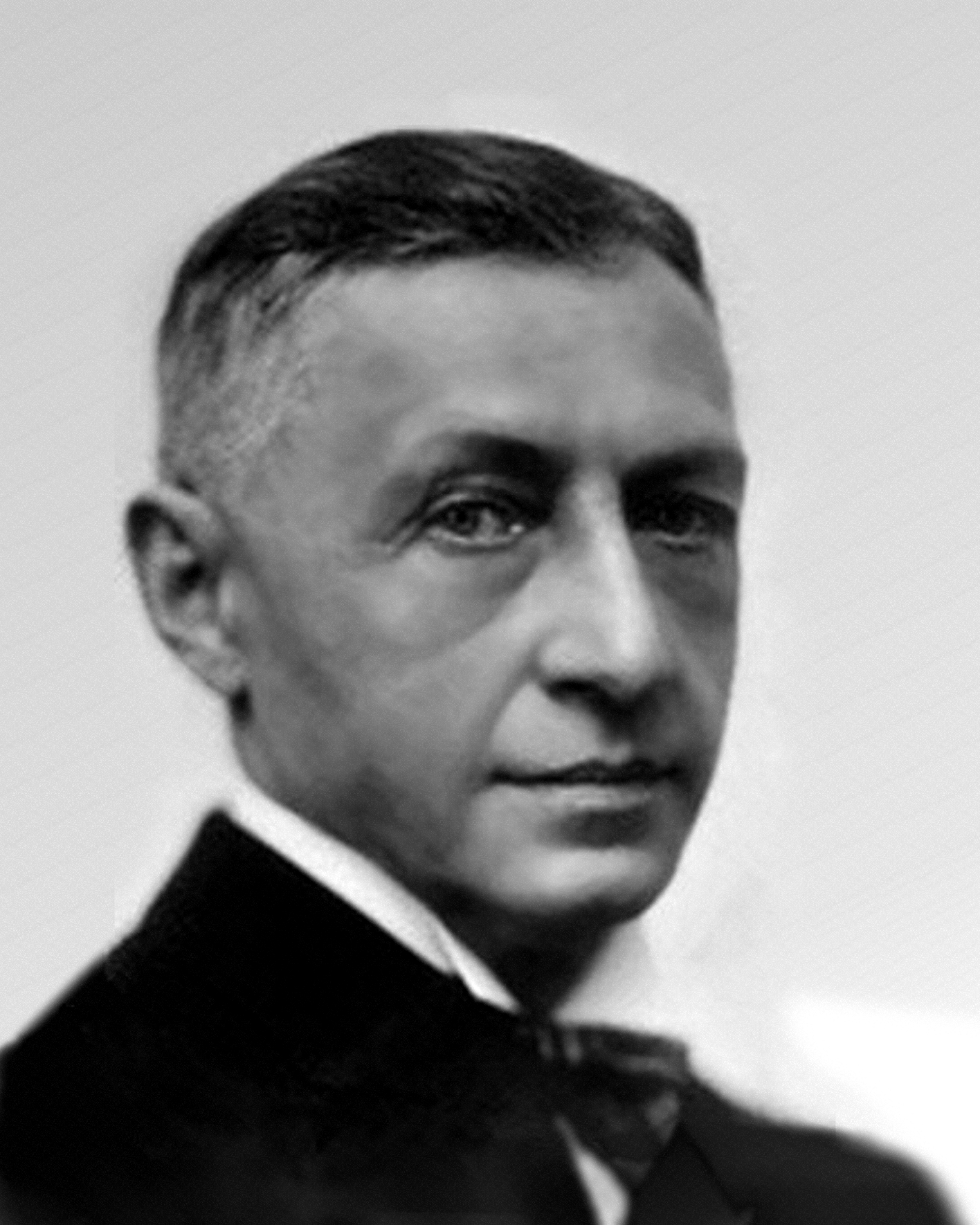
Bunin in 1933

Ivan Bunin made history as the first Russian writer to receive the Nobel Prize for Literature. The immediate basis for the award was the autobiographical novel The Life of Arseniev, but Bunin's legacy is much wider in scope. He is regarded as a master of the short story, described by scholar Oleg Mikhaylov as an "archaist innovator" who, while remaining true to the literary tradition of the 19th century, made huge leaps in terms of artistic expression and "purity of style". "[Bunin's] style heralds an historical precedent... technical precision as an instrument of bringing out beauty is sharpened to the extreme. There's hardly another poet who on dozens of pages would fail to produce a single epithet, analogy or metaphor... the ability to perform such a simplification of poetic language without doing any harm to it is the sign of a true artist. When it comes to artistic precision Bunin has no rivals among Russian poets," wrote Vestnik Evropy.

Bunin's early stories were of uneven quality. They were united in their "earthiness", lack of plot and signs of a curious longing for "life's farthest horizons"; young Bunin started his career by trying to approach the ancient dilemmas of the human being, and his first characters were typically old men. His early prose works had one common leitmotif: that of nature's beauty and wisdom bitterly contrasting with humanity's ugly shallowness. As he progressed, Bunin started to receive encouraging reviews: Anton Chekhov warmly greeted his first stories, even if he found too much "density" in them. But it was Gorky who gave Bunin's prose its highest praise. Till the end of his life Gorky (long after the relationship between former friends had soured) rated Bunin among Russian literature's greatest writers and recommended his prose for younger generations of writers as an example of true and unwithering classicism.

As a poet, Bunin started out as a follower of Ivan Nikitin and Aleksey Koltsov, then gravitated towards the Yakov Polonsky and Afanasy Fet school, the latter's impressionism becoming a marked influence. The theme of Bunin's early works seemed to be the demise of the traditional Russian nobleman of the past – something which as an artist he simultaneously gravitated toward and felt averted from. In the 1900s this gave way to a more introspective, philosophical style, akin to Fyodor Tyutchev and his "poetic cosmology". All the while Bunin remained hostile to modernism (and the darker side of it, "decadence"); Mikhaylov saw him as the torch-bearer of Aleksander Pushkin's tradition of "praising the naked simplicity's charms."

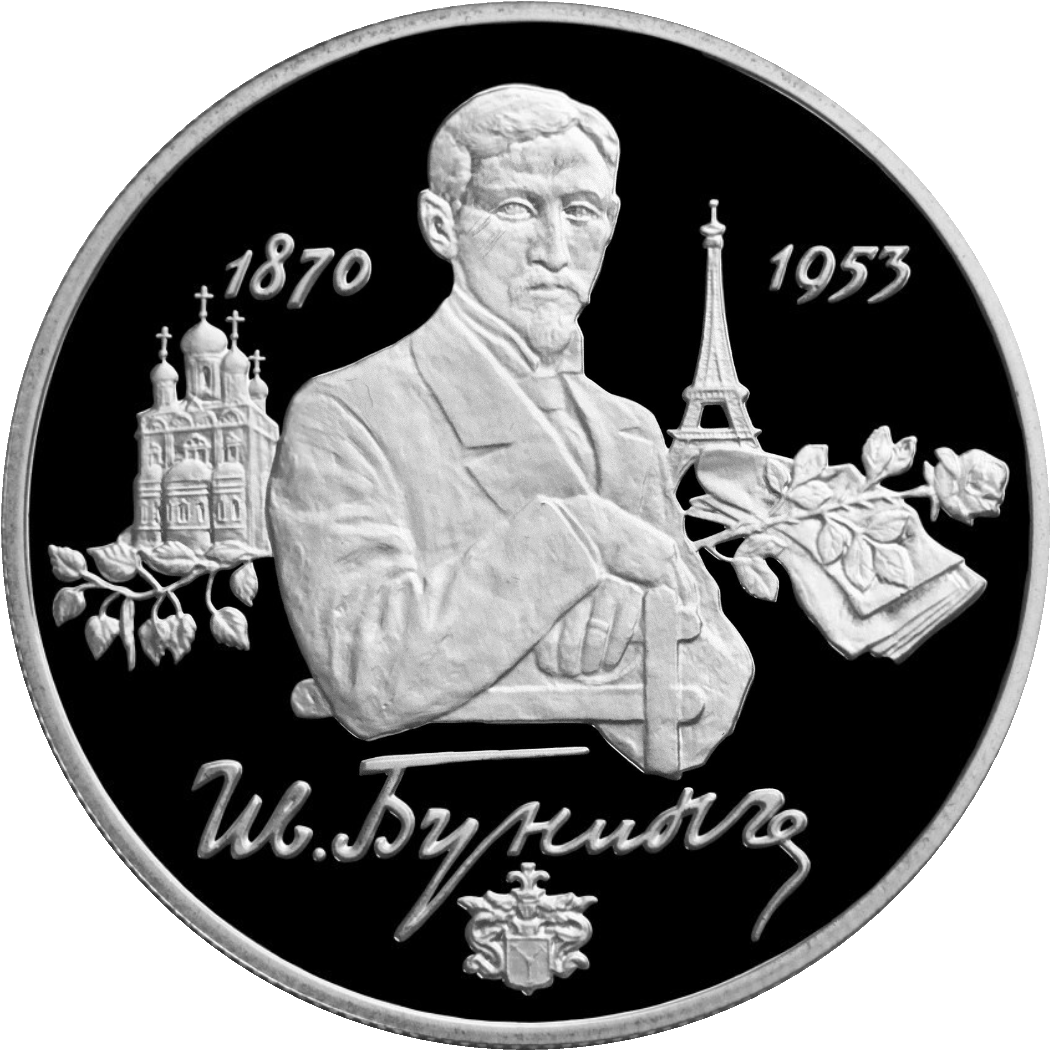
Russian commemorative coin issued in celebration of the 125th anniversary of Bunin's birth

The symbolist's flights of imagination and grotesque passions foreign to him, Bunin made nature his field of artistic research and here carved his art to perfection. "Few people are capable of loving nature as Bunin does. And it's this love that makes his scope wide, his vision deep, his colour and aural impressions so rich," wrote Aleksander Blok, a poet from a literary camp Bunin treated as hostile. It was for his books of poetry (the most notable of which is Falling Leaves, 1901) and his poetic translations that Bunin became a three time Pushkin Prize laureate. His verse was praised by Aleksander Kuprin while Blok regarded Bunin as among the first in the hierarchy of Russian poets. One great admirer of Bunin's verse was Vladimir Nabokov, who (even if making scornful remarks about Bunin's prose) compared him to Blok. Some see Bunin as a direct follower of Gogol, who was the first in Russian literature to discover the art of fusing poetry and prose together.

The wholesomeness of Bunin's character allowed him to avoid crises to become virtually the only author of the first decades of the 20th century to develop gradually and logically. "Bunin is the only one who remains true to himself", Gorky wrote in a letter to Chirikov in 1907. Yet, an outsider to all the contemporary trends and literary movements, Bunin was never truly famous in Russia. Becoming an Academician in 1909 alienated him even more from the critics, the majority of whom saw the Academy's decision to expel Gorky several years earlier as a disgrace. The closest Bunin came to fame was in 1911–1912 when The Village and Dry Valley came out. The former, according to the author, "sketched with sharp cruelty the most striking lines of the Russian soul, its light and dark sides, and its often tragic foundations"; it caused passionate, and occasionally very hostile reactions. "Nobody has ever drawn the [Russian] village in such a deep historical context before," Maxim Gorky wrote. After this uncompromising book it became impossible to continue to paint the Russian peasantry life in the idealised, narodnik-style way, Bunin single-handedly closed this long chapter in Russian literature. He maintained the truly classic traditions of realism in Russian literature at the very time when they were in the gravest danger, under attack by modernists and decadents. Yet he was far from "traditional" in many ways, introducing to Russian literature a completely new set of characters and a quite novel, laconic way of saying things.

Dry Valley was regarded as another huge step forward for Bunin. While The Village dealt metaphorically with Russia as a whole in a historical context, here, according to the author, the "Russian soul [was brought into the focus] in the attempt to highlight the Slavic psyche's most prominent features." "It's one of the greatest books of Russian horror, and there's an element of liturgy in it... Like a young priest with his faith destroyed, Bunin buried the whole of his class," wrote Gorky.

Bunin's travel sketches were lauded as innovative, notably Bird's Shadow (1907–1911). "He's enchanted with the East, with the 'light-bearing' lands he now describes in such beautiful fashion... For [depicting] the East, both Biblical and modern, Bunin chooses the appropriate style, solemn and incandescent, full of imagery, bathing in waves of sultry sunlight and adorned with arabesques and precious stones, so that, when he tells of these grey-haired ancient times, disappearing in the distant haze of religion and myth, the impression he achieves is that of watching a great chariot of human history moving before our eyes," wrote Yuri Aykhenvald. Critics noted Bunin's uncanny knack of immersing himself into alien cultures, both old and new, best demonstrated in his Eastern cycle of short stories as well as his superb translation of Henry Wadsworth Longfellow's The Song of Hiawatha (1898).

Bunin was greatly interested in international myths and folklore, as well as the Russian folkloric tradition. But, (according to Georgy Adamovich) "he was absolutely intolerant towards those of his colleagues who employed stylizations, the "style Russe" manufacturers. His cruel – and rightly so – review of Sergey Gorodetsky's poetry was one example. Even Blok's Kulikovo Field (for me, an outstanding piece) irritated him as too lavishly adorned... "That's Vasnetsov," he commented, meaning 'masquerade and opera'. But he treated things that he felt were not masqueradery differently. Of the Slovo o Polku Igoreve... he said something to the effect that all the poets of the whole world lumped together couldn't have created such wonder, in fact something close to Pushkin's words. Yet translations of the legend... outraged him, particularly that of Balmont. He despised Shmelyov for his pseudo-Russian pretenses, though admitting his literary gift. Bunin had an extraordinarily sharp ear for falseness: he instantly recognized this jarring note and was infuriated. That was why he loved Tolstoy so much. Once, I remember, he spoke of Tolstoy as the one 'who's never said a single word that would be an exaggeration'."

Bunin has often been spoken of as a "cold" writer. Some of his conceptual poems of the 1910s refuted this stereotype, tackling philosophical issues like the mission of an artist ("Insensory", 1916) where he showed fiery passion. According to Oleg Mikhaylov, "Bunin wanted to maintain distance between himself and his reader, being frightened by any closeness... But his pride never excluded passions, just served as a panzer — it was like a flaming torch in an icy shell." On a more personal level, Vera Muromtseva confirmed: "Sure, he wanted to come across as [cold and aloof] and he succeeded by being a first-class actor... people who didn't know him well enough couldn't begin to imagine what depths of soft tenderness his soul was capable of reaching," she wrote in her memoirs.

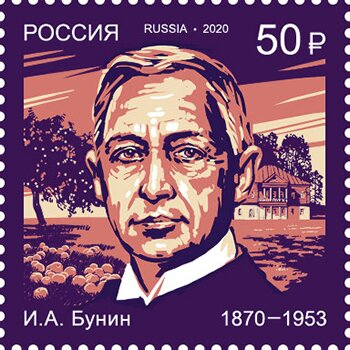
Bunin on a 2020 stamp of Russia

The best of Bunin's prose ("The Gentleman from San Francisco", "Loopy Ears" and notably, "Brothers", based on Ceylon's religious myth) had a strong philosophical streak to it. In terms of ethics Bunin was under the strong influence of Socrates (as related by Xenophon and Plato), he argued that it was the Greek classic who first expounded many things that were later found in Hindu and Jewish sacred books. Bunin was particularly impressed with Socrates's ideas on the intrinsic value of human individuality, it being a "kind of focus for higher forces" (quoted from Bunin's short story "Back to Rome"). As a purveyor of Socratic ideals, Bunin followed Leo Tolstoy; the latter's observation about beauty being "the crown of virtue" was Bunin's idea too. Critics found deep philosophical motives, and deep undercurrents in Mitya's Love and The Life of Arseniev, two pieces in which "Bunin came closest to a deep metaphysical understanding of the human being's tragic essence." Konstantin Paustovsky called The Life of Arseniev "one of the most outstanding phenomena of world literature."

In his view on Russia and its history Bunin for a while had much in common with A. K. Tolstoy (of whom he spoke with great respect); both tended to idealise the pre-Tatar Rus. Years later he greatly modified his view of Russian history, forming a more negative outlook. "There are two streaks in our people: one dominated by Rus, another by Chudh and Merya. Both have in them a frightening instability, sway... As Russian people say of themselves: we are like wood — both club and icon may come of it, depending on who is working on this wood," Bunin wrote years later.

In emigration Bunin continued his experiments with extremely concise, ultra-ionized prose, taking Chekhov and Tolstoy's ideas on expressive economy to the last extreme. The result of this was God's Tree, a collection of stories so short, some of them were half a page long. Professor Pyotr Bitsilly thought God's Tree to be "the most perfect of Bunin's works and the most exemplary. Nowhere else can such eloquent laconism can be found, such definitive and exquisite writing, such freedom of expression and really magnificent demonstration of [mind] over matter. No other book of his has in it such a wealth of material for understanding of Bunin's basic method – a method in which, in fact, there was nothing but basics. This simple but precious quality – honesty bordering on hatred of any pretense – is what makes Bunin so closely related to... Pushkin, Tolstoy and Chekhov," Bitsilli wrote.

Influential, even if controversial, was his Cursed Days 1918–1920 diary, of which scholar Thomas Gaiton Marullo wrote:

The work is important for several reasons. Cursed Days is one of the very few anti-Bolshevik diaries to be preserved from the time of the Russian Revolution and civil war. It recreates events with graphic and gripping immediacy. Unlike the works of early Soviets and emigres and their self-censoring backdrop of memory, myth, and political expediency, Bunin's truth reads almost like an aberration. Cursed Days also links Russian anti-utopian writing of the nineteenth century to its counterpart in the twentieth. Reminiscent of the fiction of Dostoevsky, it features an 'underground man' who does not wish to be an 'organ stop' or to affirm 'crystal palaces'. Bunin's diary foreshadowed such 'libelous' memoirs as Yevgenia Ginzburg's Journey into the Whirlwind (1967) and Within the Whirlwind, and Nadezhda Mandelstam's Hope Against Hope (1970) and Hope Abandoned (1974), the accounts of two courageous women caught up in the Stalinist terror of the 1930s. Cursed Days also preceded the "rebellious" anti-Soviet tradition that began with Evgeny Zamyatin and Yury Olesha, moved on to Mikhail Bulgakov, and reached a climax with Boris Pasternak and Alexander Solzhenitsyn. One can argue that, in its painful exposing of political and social utopias, Cursed Days heralded the anti-utopian writing of George Orwell and Aldous Huxley. Bunin and Zamyatin had correctly understood that the Soviet experiment was destined to self destruct."

Despite his works being virtually banned in the Soviet Union up until the mid-1950s, Bunin exerted a strong influence over several generations of Soviet writers. Among those who owed a lot to Bunin, critics mentioned Mikhail Sholokhov, Konstantin Fedin, Konstantin Paustovsky, Ivan Sokolov-Mikitov, and later Yuri Kazakov, Vasily Belov and Viktor Likhonosov.

Ivan Bunin's books have been translated into many languages, and the world's leading writers praised his gift. Romain Rolland called Bunin an "artistic genius"; he was spoken and written of in much the same vein by writers like Henri de Régnier, Thomas Mann, Rainer Maria Rilke, Jerome K. Jerome, and Jarosław Iwaszkiewicz. In 1950, on the eve of his 80th birthday, François Mauriac expressed in a letter his delight and admiration, but also his deep sympathy to Bunin's personal qualities and the dignified way he'd got through all the tremendous difficulties life had thrown at him. In a letter published by Figaro, André Gide greeted Bunin "on behalf of all France", calling him "the great artist" and adding: "I don't know of any other writer... who's so to the point in expressing human feelings, simple and yet always so fresh and new". European critics often compared Bunin to both Tolstoy and Dostoyevsky, crediting him with having renovated the Russian realist tradition both in essence and in form.

On 22 October 2020, Google celebrated his 150th birthday with a Google Doodle.

== Personal life ==
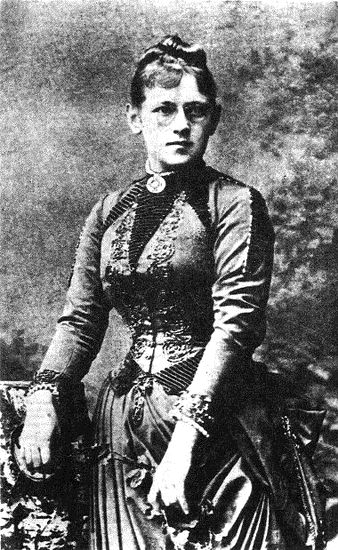
Varvara Pashchenko, 1892

Bunin's first love was Varvara Pashchenko, his classmate in Yelets [not plausible as Ivan was at a male gymnasium and Varvara at an all female gymnasium], daughter of a doctor and an actress, whom he fell for in 1889 and then went on to work with in Oryol in 1892.

Their relationship was difficult in many ways: the girl's father detested the union because of Bunin's impecunious circumstances, Varvara herself was not sure if she wanted to marry and Bunin too was uncertain whether marriage was really appropriate for him.

The couple moved to Poltava and settled in Yuly Bunin's home, but by 1892 their relations deteriorated, Pashchenko complaining in a letter to Yuly Bunin that serious quarrels were frequent, and begging for assistance in bringing their union to an end. The affair eventually ended in 1894 with her marrying actor and writer A. N. Bibikov, Ivan Bunin's close friend. Bunin felt betrayed, and for a time his family feared the possibility of him committing suicide.

According to some sources, it was Varvara Pashchenko, who many years later would appear under the name of Lika in The Life of Arseniev (chapter V of the book, entitled Lika, was also published as a short story). The scholar Tatyana Alexandrova, though, questioned this identification (suggesting Mirra Lokhvitskaya might have been the major prototype), while Vera Muromtseva thought of Lika as a 'collective' character aggregating the writer's reminiscences of several women he knew in his youth.

In the summer of 1898, while staying with writer A. M. Fedorov, Bunin became acquainted with N. P. Tsakni, a Greek social-democrat activist, the publisher and editor of the Odessa newspaper Yuzhnoe Obozrenie (Southern Review). Invited to contribute to the paper, Bunin became virtually a daily visitor to the Tsakni family dacha and fell in love with the latter's 18-year-old daughter, Anna (1879–1963).

On 23 September 1898, the two married, but by 1899, signs of alienation between them were obvious. At the time of their acrimonious separation in March 1900 Anna was pregnant. She gave birth to a son, Nikolai, in Odessa on 30 August of the same year. The boy, of whom his father saw very little, died on 16 January 1905, from a combination of scarlet fever, measles and heart complications.

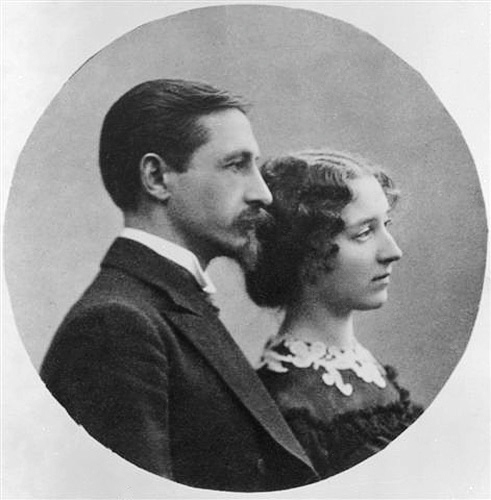
Ivan Bunin and Vera Muromtseva, 1910s

Ivan Bunin's second wife was Vera Muromtseva (1881–1961), niece of the high-ranking politician Sergey Muromtsev. The two had initially been introduced to each other by writer Ekaterina Lopatina some years earlier, but it was their encounter at the house of the writer Boris Zaitsev in November 1906 which led to an intense relationship which resulted in the couple becoming inseparable until Bunin's death. Bunin and Muromtseva married officially only in 1922, after he managed at last to divorce Tsakni legally. Decades later Vera Muromtseva-Bunina became famous in her own right with her book Life of Bunin.

In 1927, while in Grasse, Bunin fell for the Russian poet Galina Kuznetsova, on vacation there with her husband. The latter, outraged by the well-publicized affair, stormed off, while Bunin not only managed to somehow convince Vera Muromtseva that his love for Galina was purely platonic, but also invite the latter to stay in the house as a secretary and 'a family member'.

The situation was complicated by the fact that Leonid Zurov, who stayed with the Bunins as a guest for many years, was secretly in love with Vera (of which her husband was aware); this made it more of a "love quadrilateral" than a mere triangle.

Bunin and Kuznetsova's affair ended dramatically in 1942 when the latter, now deeply in love with another frequent guest, opera singer Margo Stepun, sister of Fyodor Stepun, left Bunin, who felt disgraced and insulted.

The writer's tempestuous private life in emigration became the subject of the internationally acclaimed Russian movie, His Wife's Diary (or The Diary of His Wife) (2000). which caused controversy and was described by some as masterful and thought-provoking, but by others as vulgar, inaccurate and in bad taste.

Vera Muromtseva-Bunina later accepted both Kuznetsova and Margarita Stepun as friends: "nashi" ('ours'), as she called them, lived with the Bunins for long periods during the Second World War. According to A.J. Heywood of Leeds University, in Germany and then New York, after the war, Kuznetsova and Stepun negotiated with publishers on Bunin's behalf and maintained a regular correspondence with Ivan and Vera up until their respective deaths.

== Bibliography ==
=== Novel ===
- The Life of Arseniev (Жизнь Арсеньева, 1927–1933, 1939)

=== Short novels ===
- The Village (Деревня, 1910)
- Dry Valley (Суходол, 1912)
- Mitya's Love (Митина любовь, 1924)

=== Short story collections ===
- To the Edge of the World and Other Stories (На край света и другие рассказы, 1897)
- Antonovka Apples (Антоновские яблоки, 1900)
- Flowers of the Field (Цветы полевые, 1901)
- Bird's Shadow (Тень птицы, 1907–1911; Paris, 1931)
- Ioann the Mourner (Иоанн Рыдалец, 1913)
- Chalice of Life (Чаша жизни, Petersburg, 1915; Paris, 1922)
- The Gentleman from San Francisco (Господин из Сан-Франциско, 1916)
- Chang's Dreams (Сны Чанга, 1916, 1918)
- Temple of the Sun (Храм Солнца, 1917)
- Primal Love (Начальная любовь, Prague, 1921)
- Scream (Крик, Paris, 1921)
- Rose of Jerico (Роза Иерихона, Berlin, 1924)
- Mitya's Love (Митина любовь, Paris, 1924; New York, 1953)
- Sunstroke (Солнечный удар, Paris, 1927)
- Sacred Tree (Божье древо, Paris, 1931)
- Dark Avenues (Тёмные аллеи, New York, 1943; Paris, 1946)
- Judea in Spring (Весной в Иудее, New York, 1953)
- Loopy Ears and Other Stories (Петлистые уши и другие рассказы, 1954, New York, posthumous)

=== Poetry ===
- Poems (1887–1891) (1891, originally as a literary supplement to Orlovsky vestnik newspaper)
- Under the Open Skies (Под открытым небом, 1898)
- Falling Leaves (Листопад, Moscow, 1901)
- Poems (1903) (Стихотворения, 1903)
- Poems (1903–1906) (Стихотворения, 1906)
- Poems of 1907 (Saint Petersburg, 1908)
- Selected Poems (Paris, 1929)

==== Translations ====
- Henry Wadsworth Longfellow. The Song of Hiawatha (1898)

=== Memoirs and diaries ===
- Waters Aplenty (Воды многие, 1910, 1926)
- Cursed Days (Окаянные дни, 1925–1926)
- Memoirs. Under the hammer and sickle. (Воспоминания. Под серпом и молотом. 1950)

== See also ==
- List of poems by Ivan Bunin
- List of short stories by Ivan Bunin
