= Dreams (novella) =

- Short story by Ivan Bunin
- Original title: Сны
- Country: Russia
- Language: Russian

Publication
- Publication date: 1904

"Dreams" (Russian: Сны, romanized: Sny) is a novella by Nobel Prize-winning Russian author Ivan Bunin, written in the late 1903 and first published in the first book of the Znanie (Knowledge) Saint Petersburg literary almanach in 1904, where it was coupled with another short novella, "The Golden Bottom" (Золотое дно), under the common title "Black Earth" (Чернозём). "Dreams" is generally regarded as the turning point in Bunin's literary career, marking the radical turn towards social issues prior to which he had mostly avoided.

== Background ==
Bunin was one of the most prolific contributors to the Znanie publishing house's literary compilations. In all, sixteen books of the series featured his work. Originally, besides several poems, another story was planned for the inclusion into the Book I, called "In Corns" (В хлебах; later re-titled and now known as "The Distant Things", Далёкое). Having failed to finish it in time, in a December 11, 1903, letter Bunin informed Maxim Gorky and Konstantin Pyatnitsky: "I send you the story, but it is not the one that's been promised. [In Corns] proved to be such a torture to me, it has to be five times as large. What I send you instead is a couple of short sketches, united by the common title and one general feel. One of them you've heard, Aleksey Maksimovich, I've been reading it to you. Should some things need be cut out for censors, please do it, I'm so eager to see this coming through!"

== Critical reception ==
Both the first Znanie book, and Bunin's contribution to it were widely discussed in the early 1900s Russian press. Aleksander Amfiteatrov (under 'Abbadonna' nom de plume), wrote in newspaper Rus:

Bunin is the master of laconic art of sketches. Tendentiousness is foreign to him. He is too much of an artist to [fall a victim to preconceptions]. So if the pictures he comes up with all of a sudden acquire the character of social commentary, then it is not because he'd meant them to, but because his exceptional truthfulness and masterful implementational performance make these sketches come across as something undeniably typical.

In Mir Bozhiy magazine critic M. Nevedovsky also wrote favourably of Ivan Bunin's making a turn towards social issues. The story "embraced the huge scope of [Russia]'s rural world, being in its approach much wider than his previous works and much more exquisite in form," he argued.

One of the story's harshest critics was Vladimir Korolenko who, writing for Russkoye Bogatstvo, described it as "a set of lightweight vignettes concerned mostly with pictures of nature, full of emotional laments for things of long forgotten past." Korolenko admitted that Bunin "has caught some smothered whispers about things of the old and things yet to come, of murky grey figures from the third class wagon's twilight," but added – "...its just that he couldn't find enough patience in him to lend his ear to what's been whispered, properly." Much as he respected Korolenko and his opinions, Bunin noted in his diary that the latter "misunderstood the essence of these two stories totally."

=== The 1953 Bunin commentaries ===
Not long before his death in 1953, revising the text for the Loopy Ears collection (published posthumously in New York City in 1954), Bunin provided the following commentary: "The 'Dreams' novella was written in the end of 1903 – half a century ago! – and at the time I rather hastily sent it to the first Znanie book where it was published without me making final edits, which explained numerous flaws in it which now I've sorted out… But still Chekhov in his letter to Amfiteatrov on April 13, 1904, wrote: 'Today I've read Znanie's first compilatiom and in it one brilliant Bunin story. This one is truly superb, some moments in it are unbelievable. I strongly recommend it to your attention'."

Commenting on this, Soviet critic V.Titova pointed out (in the 1965 The Works by I.A.Bunin, Vol. II commentaries) that Checkov's words were slightly misquoted by Bunin, since in the letter to Amfiteatrov he wrote of "the brilliant 'Black Earth' story", not "Dreams" (which was originally only part of it), as the author seemed to imply. It remained unclear, Titova remarked, which "numerous flaws" Bunin was speaking of, since "Dreams" was one of the very few texts he's made all but no changes in through the 1910s and 1920s. Only the meschanin vs. red-haired peasant dialogue in the original version was much more violent, purporting to show, apparently, the depth of class hatred between the two and "the growing sense of independence Russian peasants have got the smell of," according to the critic.
