= The Life of Arseniev =

1939 novel by Ivan Bunin

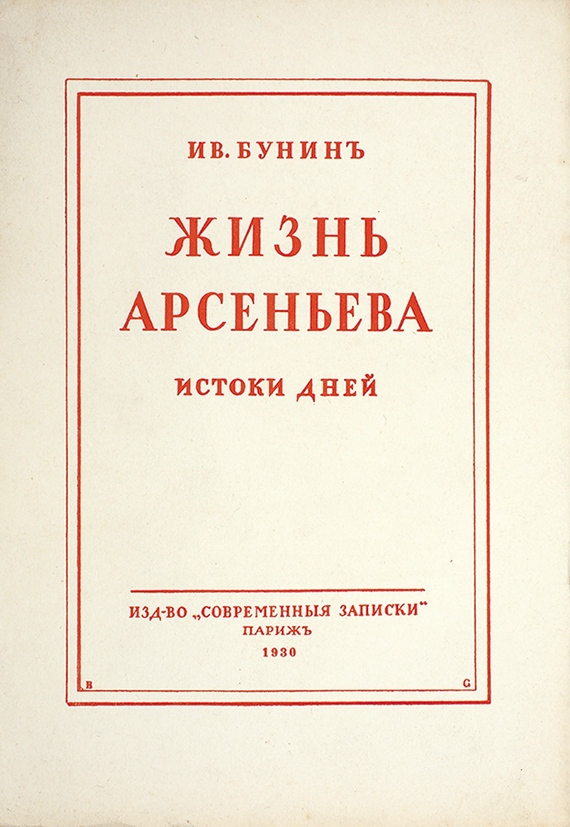
- First edition
- Author: Ivan Bunin
- Language: Russian
- Genre: autobiographical novel
- Publisher: Sovremennye zapiski
- Publication date: 1930
- Publication place: France / United States
- English publication date: 1933

The Life of Arseniev: Youth (Russian: Жизнь Арсеньева. Юность) is an autobiographical novel by Nobel Prize-winning Russian author Ivan Bunin seen by many as his most important work written in emigration. It is Bunin's only full-length novel.

The novel was written and published in parts in the course of the 12 years, in 1927-1939, in France. In 1952 the New-York-based Chekhov Publishers released the first complete edition of the novel.

== Background ==
Book I was finished on 21 September of that year. Book II on September 27, 1927, Book III on September 30, 1928 and Book IV on July 30, 1929. The latter was published in 1932. In the process of publishing the original text was being changed continuously: autobiographical details being cut off, real names changed. For example, the Gendurist family Bunin knew in Poltava, featured as the Bogdanovs in the latter versions. Sister Nadya who died at the early age, was called now Sasha. Some ideologically charged fragments went out too, like the one in Chapter 9 of Book IV where Arseniev spoke of narodniks's circle and his own views on one's social responsibilities. The four finished parts of the novel came out as a book in 1930, subtitled The Well of Days. The book was published in 1933 in English as The Well of Days.

In 1939 the Book V, entitled: The Life of Arseniev. Novel. Lika, was published by the Petropolis Publishers in Brussels in 1939. It was supposed to be included into the Vol.12 of the Petropolis' Complete Bunin, but in 1939 the publishing house closed. According to Vera Muromtseva-Bunina, "Ivan Alekseyevich wanted desperately to include the [final part] into the novel but the latter has been published already and so he released it as a separate edition as soon as the chance presented itself." According to Mark Aldanov, "many people were trying to convince [Bunin] he should start the second part but he was always saying the same thing: 'That one has been written about people gone and deeds done, long ago. How am I suppose [sic] to write fiction about people who are still alive?'."

In 1952 the New-York-based Chekhov Publishers released the first edition of the novel as a whole, entitled The Life of Arseniev. Youth. That same year Bunin edited the text again for future re-issues. The date of his last edit was March 17, 1952.

=== Concept and realization ===
Anna Muromtseva-Bunina wrote: "Ivan Alekseevich seldom spoke of his plans. For the first time he told me of his intention to write a book about his life was on his 50th birthday, October 23, 1920. But those were the times he was very ill and still suffered from nervous exhaustion. He started writing The Life of Arsenyev in 1927 in Grasse." On the envelope of the manuscript's first version Bunin wrote: "Biographical notes and some fiction - for the novel in three parts. Started on 21.VI.1927."

The idea of "resurrecting some kind of faraway image of youth, and may be an imaginary younger brother who might have left this world many years ago, taking his infinitely distant times away with him..." came to Bunin much earlier. In 1929, publishing the new version of "At the Outset" (1906) novella, Bunin re-titled it as "The Mirror", adding a sub-title: "The Life of Arseniev's earlier sketch". Another novella, "Eight Years" (known variously as "In Corn Fields", "Distant Things" and "The Dream of Oblomov the Grandson") has been acknowledged as another fragment of Life of Arseniev's earlier version.

Bunin's major motive for writing The Life of Arseniev was his own deep-seated "fear of oblivion" which he from time to time expressed. "Life, arguably, is given to one only as a weapon for one's contest with death, which man has to fight even beyond his grave. Death steals his name, yet he writes it on a cross or on a gravestone. She shrouds his lifetime with darkness, but again he resurrects his name using a written word", he wrote.

The Life of Arseniev, as both Bunin and Muromtseva-Bunina were keen to stress, was not an autobiography, but a work of fiction, interspersed with autobiographical details, not necessarily chronologically congruous. Vladislav Khodasevich called the book "a made-up character's autobiography". "Everybody tends to read The Life of Arseniev as the account of my own life. That is not so. Reality is something that I am totally incapable of writing about directly. Even the heroine here is cooked up. But so immersed into her being I was that I came to believe in her, as if she were a real person, and so strong was that belief that I that couldn't help crying as I was writing about her. She visited me in dreams, even," Bunin said in 1933.
