= Loopy Ears =

- Short story by Ivan Bunin
- 1954 Russian edition
- Original title: Петлистые уши
- Language: Russian

Publication
- Published in: Slovo, No.7
- Publication type: Anthology
- Publication date: 1917

"Loopy Ears" (Петлистые уши, Petli′stye U′shi) is a short story by Nobel Prize-winning Russian author Ivan Bunin which was written in 1917 and gave his posthumous 1954 collection its title. The story was first published in the seventh issue of the Slovo anthology (Moscow, 1917) and remains to this day one of the most talked about Bunin's stories, being the first piece of work in Russian literature featuring a serial killer as the main character. Mark Aldanov considered the story one of Bunin's best.

Some scholars regard "Loopy Ears" as a dark parody of Crime and Punishment and one striking example of Bunin's deep antagonism towards Fyodor Dostoyevsky and the ideas he represented.

== Background ==
Originally Bunin planned to write a large novel about a serial killer, "vyrodok" (a moral degenerate) named Sokolovych, for which the now known text of the story would form a kind of primal factual basis. In the Russian State Archive of Literature and Art (ЦГАЛИ) there are several expanded versions of the story, each pointing to directions in which it was supposed to develop into a novel. One of them feature as its obvious turning point Sokolovich's words addressed to a policeman: "In this case I am more of a sufferer than a criminal. Why? This does not concern you in any way".

In another rough draft Sokolovich's family past and socio-psychological aspects of the environment were explored. In it, the murderer, arrested in Vologda a month after the act, asks for permission to produce a hand-written account of what preceded it and (according to the author) "comes out with something much more cruel and bizarre than might have been expected even taking into account the nature of the atrocity committed."

The main prototype of Sokolovich is murderer Nikolay Radkevich convicted in 1912.

=== Crime and Punishment parallels ===
According to the literary scholar Aleksandr Dolinin, Looped Ears (that's his version of the title's translation) "rewrites" Crime and Punishment, constructing a "recognizable Dostoevskian world of gloomy, oppressive Saint Petersburg with its misty streets, demonic slums, seedy taverns and hotels, and then exploding it from within." The story's two characters, the murderer Sokolovich and the prostitute Korolkova, his victim, are "the grim travesties of Raskolnikov and Sonia lacking any redeeming moral aspects of their models." Bunin's down-to-earth treatment of murder and prostitution, argues the critic, is intended to debunk Dostoevsky's melodramatic 'humanization' of the subject. Sokolovich takes it upon himself to take issue with the author of Crime and Punishment in his monologue, expounding his own philosophy of murder:

It is time to abandon the fairy tale about pangs of conscience, about those horrors which supposedly haunt the murderer. Enough of lies about killers shuddering from the sight of blood. Enough of writing novels about crimes with their punishments; it is time to write about crime without any punishment at all. The state of the murderer's mind depends on his view of the murder and on what he expects to get for it, the gallows or, reward and praise. In truth, are they tormented, are they horrified, those who accept ancestral revenge, duels, war, revolution and executions? [...] It seems that the only one tormented was Raskolnikov, but it happened because of his anemia and the will of his vicious author who shoved Jesus into every one of his dime novels.
