= Bird's Shadow =

- First edition
- Author: Ivan Bunin
- Original title: Тень птицы
- Language: Russian
- Genre: short story
- Publication date: 1931 (France)
- Publication place: Russia, France
- Media type: Print (hardback & paperback)

Bird's Shadow (Russian: Тень птицы, romanized: Ten ptitsy) is a collection of short stories by Nobel Prize-winning Russian author Ivan Bunin, inspired by the tour over the Middle East he and wife Vera Muromtseva undertook in the 1900s. Written between 1907 and 1911, these stories came out as a separate edition in Paris in 1931, although most of them had appeared in the Temple of the Sun 1917 compilation. The title refers to the Huma bird; Bunin writes of the view from the Galata Tower that he can see "the entire immense land... on which fell the 'shadow of the Huma Bird' ... the commenters on Saadi explain that this is a legendary bird and that its shadow brings to anyone on which it falls majesty and immortality"

The book's working title was Fields of the Dead, for, as the author argued, "aren't they all fields of the dead – Baalbek and Palmyra, Babylon and Assyria, Judea and Egypt?... But the East is the realm of the Sun, and the future belongs to the East".

Critics praised Ivan Bunin's traveler's sketches, seeing them as an integral and highly important part of his legacy. Bunin's "longing for the ceaseless, unrelenting wandering" and his "insatiable perceptiveness" (as he himself put it, in the foreword to The Scream, 1921 Paris compilation) was something he's been long obsessed with. Later scholars saw it as part of his artistic philosophy, aiming at "the understanding of all times and peoples' tribulations." In his "Liberation of Tolstoy" essay Bunin wrote about some artists' ability to "feel other times... better than that of their own" and, critics argued, this "transformational" quality was something he's made very much of his own.

== List of Bird's Shadow's short stories ==
- "Bird's Shadow" (Тень птицы). First published in the Zemlya (Earth) almanac, Vol.1, Moscow, 1908.
- "The Sea of the Gods" (Море богов). Severnoye Siyanie (Northern Lights) magazine, Saint Petersburg, 1908, No.11, November.
- "Delta" (Дельта). Poslednye Novosty newspaper, Paris, 1932, No.4085, May 29. In 1915 The Works by I.A. Bunin it was part of the piece called "Zodiacal Light".
- "Zodiacal Light" (Свет Зодиака). Poslednye Novosty, Paris 1929, No.3000, June 9.
- "Judea" (Иудея). Drykarh anthology, Moscow, 1910. Originally parts of it, "The Stone" and "Sheol", were separate stories.
- "The Stone" (Камень). Poslednye Novosty, Paris, 1929, No.2930, March 31. In the 1915 edition of the Works by I.A. Bunin it corresponds to chapters 4 and 5 of "Judea".
- "Sheol" (Шеол). Bird's Shadow, Paris, 1931. In the 1915 edition of the Works by I.A. Bunin it corresponds to charter 6 of "Judea".
- "The Devil's Desert" (Пустыня дьявола). Russkoye Slovo newspaper, Moscow, 1909, No.296, December 25.
- "The Sodom Country" (Страна содомская). Russkoye Slovo, 1911, No.158, July 10, as "The Dead Sea" (Мёртвое море).
- "Temple of the Sun" (Храм Солнца). Sovremenny Mir magazine, Saint Petersburg, 1909, No.12, December.
- "Gennisaret" (Геннисарет). Russkoye Slovo, Moscow, 1912, No.297, December 25. Written while on Capri, on December 9, 1911. In the 1927 publication (Vozrozhdenye, Paris) dated as "1907-1927".
