= Boris Zaytsev (writer) =

Russian writer

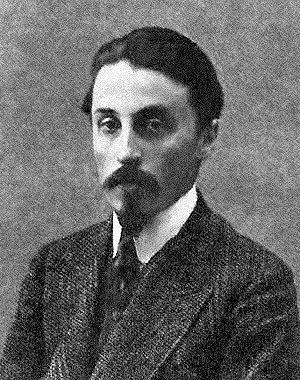
- Born: 10 February 1881; Oryol, Russian Empire
- Died: 22 January 1972 (aged 90); Paris, France

Boris Konstantinovich Zaytsev (Russian: Борис Константинович Зайцев; 10 February 1881 – 22 January 1972) was a prose writer and dramatist, and a member of the Moscow literary group Sreda.

== Biography ==
Zaytsev was born in Oryol. He attended the Imperial Technical Institute in Moscow, the Institute of Mines in Saint Petersburg, and the Law School at the University of Moscow, without graduating from any of them. He first began publishing his fictional works in 1901, and several of his stories were published in the journal The New Direction ran by Dmitry Merezhkovsky and Zinaida Gippius. His first collection of stories was published in 1906. His first novel, A Distant Journey, appeared in 1912.

He was chairman of the Moscow Union of Writers from 1921 to 1922. In 1922 he was allowed to move to Paris for health reasons, where he became one of the leading emigre writers. His first published novel was "A distant region" (1915, Moscow); the year after his death, in 1973, one of his best prose works, "Serene Twilights," was published by an emigre press in Paris. He published many works in exile, including his novel of love set in Russia, Anna (1929). He was also a biographer and a translator; among his biographical works were lives of Ivan Turgenev and Anton Chekhov; he translated The Divine Comedy of Dante Alighieri into Russian. The key influences on Zaytsev's fiction writing were Mikhail Lermontov, Vasily Zhukovsky, and Alexander Blok. He died, aged 90, in Paris.

Art historian Francis Haskell was the son of his sister Vera.

=== English translations ===
- A Distant Journey,(novel), 1912.
- Anna, (novel), translated by Natalie Duddington, Henry Holt and Co, NY, 1937.
- Avdotya-Death, The Heart of Abraham, and A Conversation with Zinaida, (short stories), from A Russian Cultural Revival, University of Tennessee Press, 1981. ISBN 0-87049-296-9
