= Russian Spring =

Russian Spring may refer to:

- 2014 pro-Russian unrest in Ukraine, known as the "Russian Spring"
- The "first Russian spring" of the 1950s during the leadership of Nikita Khrushchev in Russia
- Russian Spring, a 1991 novel by Norman Spinrad
- Russian Spring, a musical project by Pete Namlook
- "Russian Spring", a 1905 poem by Ivan Bunin

== See also ==
- Spring (political terminology)
- Russian Spring Punch, an IBA Official Cocktail
