= Amparo Fortuny =

Spanish film director

- Born: Amparo Soria Fortuny; Valencia, Spain
- Occupations: Film director and producer
- Known for: Spanish Teen Rally

Amparo Soria Fortuny (Valencian: [amˈpaɾo foɾˈtuɲ], Spanish: [amˈpaɾo foɾˈtun]) is a Spanish director and producer of films and documentaries. As a documentary filmmaker she is best known for the feature film Spanish Teen Rally. Estudiar En Primavera, which is about a group of teenagers whose protests in defense of Public Education triggered the "Valencian Spring".

== Biography ==
Fortuny was born in the city of València, Spain. She studied at Instituto Lluís Vives, screenwriting at NIC, earned a degree from the Escuela de Cinematografía y del Audiovisual de la Comunidad de Madrid (ECAM) and a master's degree from the Glasgow School of Art.

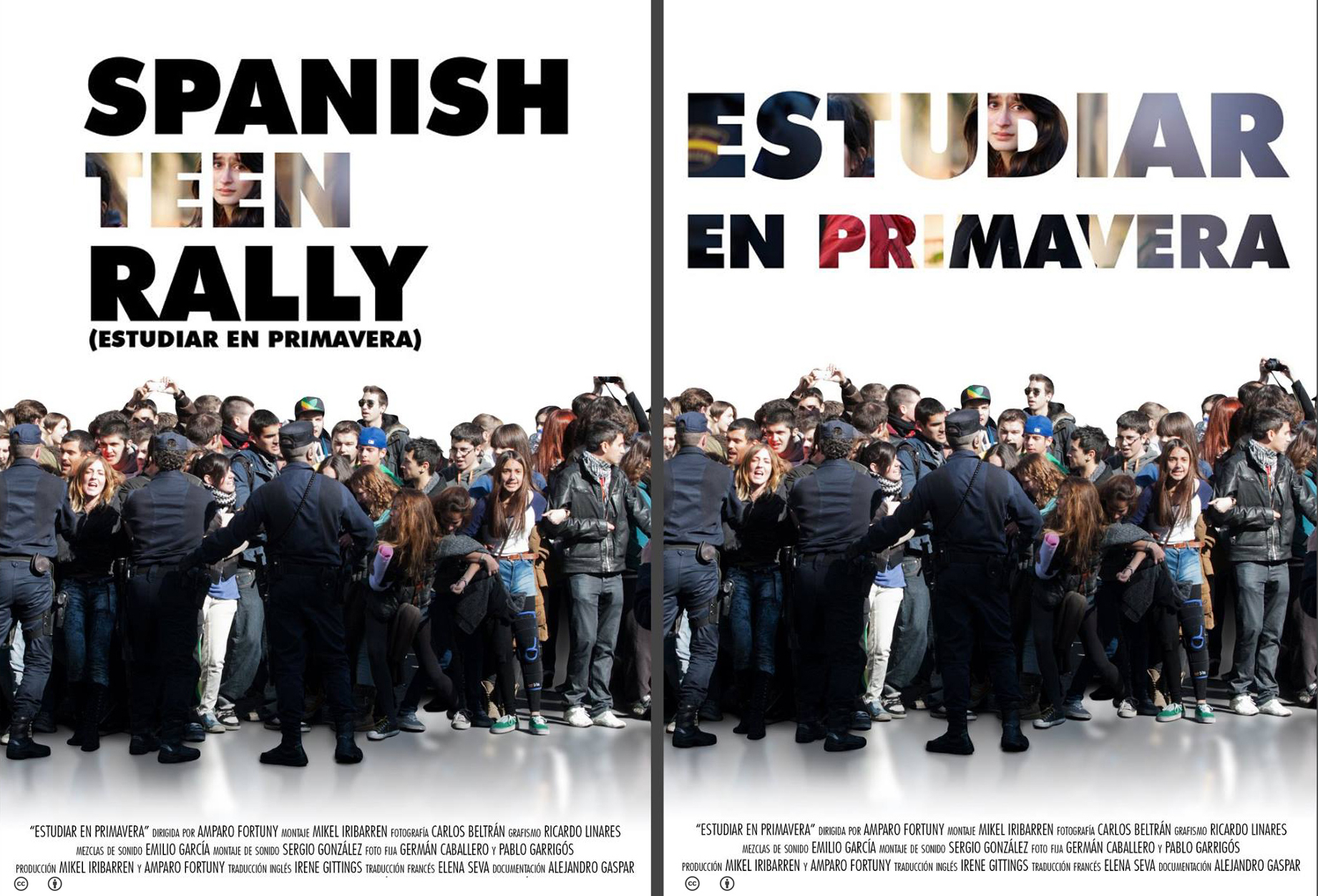
Film poster Estudiar en primavera

For years, she coordinated working on television with various audiovisual projects. (Note: Her audiovisual projects include: video activism, the collective documentary My Choice. The Freedom Train, pop up cinema and radical film culture.) Her work has been exhibited internationally at film festivals, museums and art galleries. She founded her own production company The Next Day Films (Note: The Next Day Films was founded by Amparo Fortuny in Scotland.) which has produced documentary films, shorts, music videos, participatory projects, experimental films, VR and commercials and projects outside the audiovisual sector, such as exhibitions, cultural management, campaigns and other types of cultural projects. She has directed shortfilms, Videos and the feature documentary Spanish Teen Rally (Estudiar en primavera) premiered at Cineteca Matadero Madrid Centre for Contemporary Creation. It was well received by the media and has been screened internationally at various film festivals. She is also lecturer of filmmaking and storytelling at Glasgow Clyde College.

== Filmography ==
Direction

Year	Film / TV	Notes
2014	Estudiar en primavera (Spanish Teen Rally)	Film director / screenwriter.
2012	La Mata	Co-director with Irene De Juan
2010	Come on Gym	Director. Broadcast MTV
2008	Quizá Broadway	Film director / screenwriter

== See also ==
- List of documentary films

== Bibliography ==
- Vañó Vicedo, Raquel; García Sáez, José Antonio (May 2015). "La protesta social: ejercicio y represión". Educar la mirada. Documentales para una enseñanza crítica de los derechos humanos (in Spanish) (1st ed.). Valencia: Tirant lo Blanc. pp. 171–180. ISBN 9788490866344.
- Suárez Suárez, Carmen (2020). El tren de la libertad: las mujeres decidimos (in Spanish) (Issue 7 of Biblioteca Añil feminista ed.). Spain: Almud Ediciones de Castilla-La Mancha, 2020. p. 165. ISBN 9788412094190.
- Vélez-Serna, María (2020-06-05). "7". Ephemeral Cinema Spaces: Stories of Reinvention, Resistance and Community (1st ed.). Netherlands: Amsterdam University Press. pp. 173–200. doi:10.2307/j.ctv12sdvk3.11. ISBN 9789048537822. S2CID 242716354.
- Newsinger, Jack; Wayne, Mike; Presence, Steve (2020-07-15). "6. Spaces of the possible: developing the Radical Film Network in Scotland.". Contemporary Radical Film Culture: Networks, Organisations and Activists (1st ed.). United Kingdom: Taylor & Francis. pp. 69–78. ISBN 9781351006361.
- Millán Trujillo, María José (2013-04-25). Piqueras Sánchez, Norberto; Millán Trujillo, María José (eds.). Memoria y vigencia de un compromiso (Hardcover) (in Spanish) (2nd ed.). Spain: PUV. p. 243. ISBN 9788437090900.
