= Spring (political terminology) =

Political term for protest movements

Political "spring" is a term popularized in the late twentieth century to refer to any of a number of student protests, revolutionary political movements or revolutionary waves. It originated in the European Revolutions of 1848, which was sometimes referred to as the "Spring of Nations" or "Springtime of the Peoples".

- Spring Thunder, a term used by the People's Daily (the propaganda newspaper of the Central Committee of the Chinese Communist Party) to describe the Naxalbari uprising in India in 1967.
- Prague Spring, a period of political liberalization of the Czechoslovak Socialist Republic in 1968
- Croatian Spring, a 1971 movement for Croatian language rights and cultural identity in the Socialist Federal Republic of Yugoslavia
- Beijing Spring, a period of political liberalization in the People's Republic of China in the late 1970s
- Seoul Spring, a period of democratization in South Korea in the late 1970s and early 1980s
- Rangoon Spring, sometimes used to describe the period leading up to the 8888 Uprising in Burma (now Myanmar) on 8 August 1988
- Kathmandu Spring, sometimes used to describe the 1990 People's Movement in Nepal, as well as subsequent democratic movements.
- Tehran Spring, sometimes used to describe the period in Iran during the 1997–2005 presidency of Mohammad Khatami
- Damascus Spring, period in Syria following the death of Hafez al-Assad in 2001
- Cedar Spring was a chain of demonstrations in Lebanon (especially in the capital Beirut) triggered by the assassination of the former Lebanese Prime Minister Rafik Hariri on February 14, 2005.
- Harare Spring, sometimes used to describe the period in Zimbabwe after the 2008 power sharing agreement between Robert Mugabe and Morgan Tsvangirai
- 2009 Iranian presidential election protests, or Persian Spring
- Arab Spring, another term for the Middle East—North Africa protests of 2010–2014
- Riyadh Spring, sometimes used to describe the 2011–12 Saudi Arabian protests.
- The 2012 Quebec student protests movement is also called the 'Maple' Spring, from the French "Printemps Érable" which sounds phonetically similar to "Printemps Arabe" (Arab Spring). "Printemps Québécois" for "Quebec Spring" is also used.
- The 2012 Valencia student protests, also called Valencian Spring. In February 2012 the students of the Lluís Vives High school participated in several demonstrations to protest against the cutbacks in the educational budgets of the Valencian Autonomous Community. The police’s performance in those demonstrations was extremely controversial and appeared in many international media. This sparked the interest of Parents Associations and both Student and International organisations, such as Amnesty International and Save the Children. The documentary Spanish Teen Rally collect the testimony of Valencian Spring's students.
- Turkish Spring, the 2013 Gezi Park protests
- Ukrainian Spring, a term sometimes used to describe the 2013-14 Euromaidan protests.
- Russian Spring, sometimes used to describe 2014 pro-Russian unrest in Ukraine that arose partly in response to the Euromaidan protests.
- Bosnian Spring, a term sometimes used to describe 2014 unrest in Bosnia and Herzegovina.
- Venezuelan Spring, sometimes used to describe the 2014 Venezuelan protests.
- Latin American spring, sometimes used to describe mass protest events that took place in Latin America between 2019 and 2022.
- Dalit Spring, used to describe a wave of anti-caste activism in India from 2002 to 2018.
- Asian Spring is sometimes used to describe a series of Gen Z protests in Asia during the 2020s.
- Spring Revolution is a term commonly used within Myanmar as the name for both the 2020s ongoing Myanmar protests and ongoing Myanmar civil war. The Spring Revolution Alliance is a coalition of groups fighting against the military junta that seized power in 2021.
