= Latin American spring =

Anti-government protests

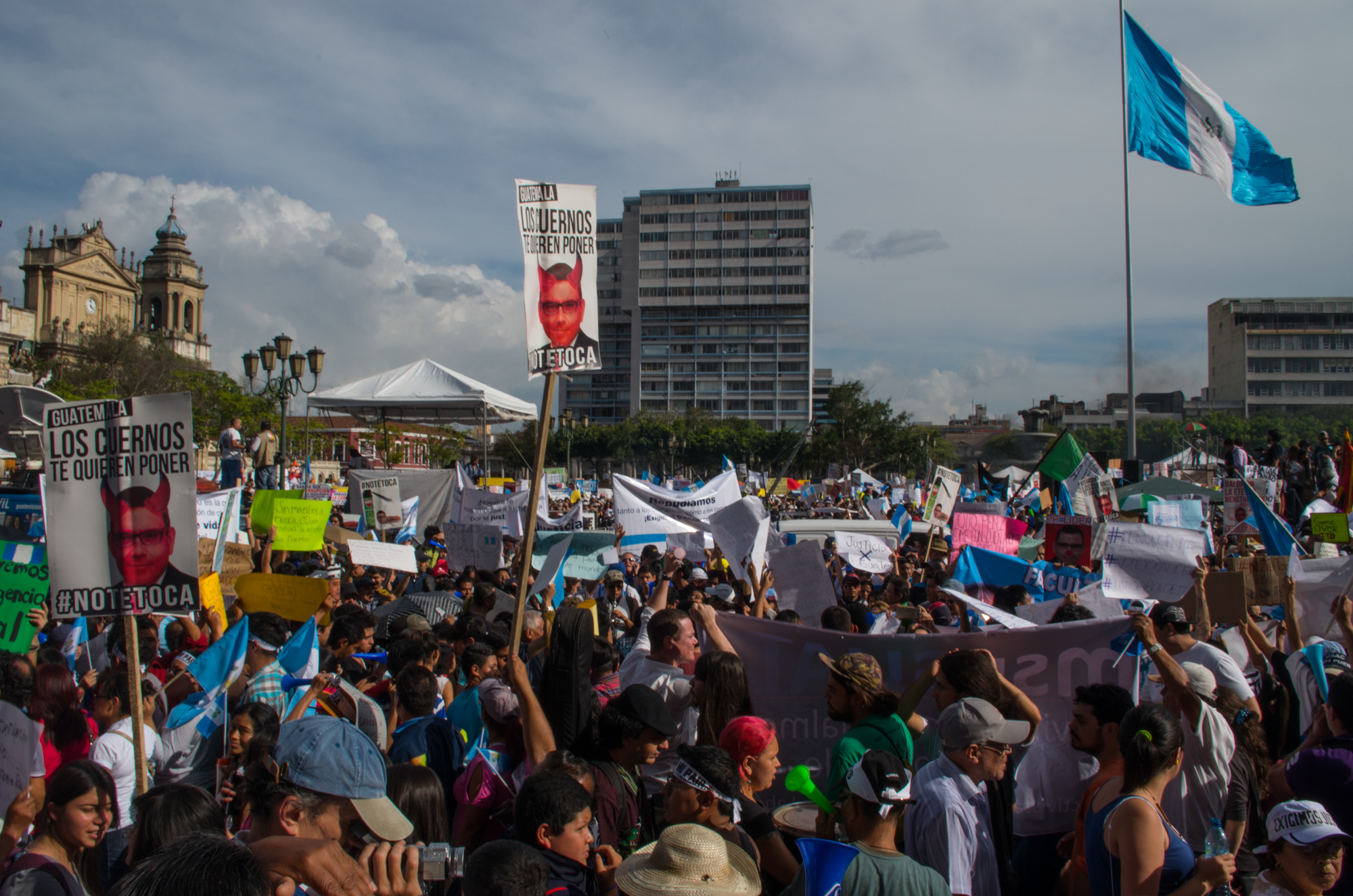
- Demonstration against corruption in Guatemala
- Date: 2014–present
- Location: South and Central America
- Caused by: End of 2000s commodities boom; 2010s oil glut; Odebrecht case; Increasing corruption and authoritarianism
- Status: Ongoing

The Latin American Spring (Spanish: Primavera Latinoamericana, Portuguese: Primavera Latino-americana) was a series of anti-government protests and uprisings that spread across much of Latin America between the late 2010s and early 2020s. These protests are a response to opposing neoliberal economic policies and negligence in the COVID-19 pandemic. The term was first coined by British newspaper The Guardian to describe a series of escalation in Latin America in 2019.

== Background ==
This chapter examines historic developments in Latin America (especially South America) over the past twenty five years that have been underreported in the United States but that have helped to transform the region and hemispheric relations. Beginning in 1998, voters in Latin America began to elect a series of leaders who ran on platforms explicitly opposing neoliberal economic policies. These left-wing governments (often referred to as a Pink tide) have pursued some policies that departed from those of the previous two to three decades. The rebound in economic growth, poverty reduction, and other changes in these countries, including Argentina, Bolivia, Brazil, Ecuador, and Venezuela, are examined in turn, as well as recent economic problems. These countries’ political choices have also led the region to become more independent of the United States than ever before, and the change in hemispheric relations is also examined.

== Causes ==
=== 2000s commodities boom ===
In 2000s, world commodities has experienced a surge in price due to the rising demand after the end of Great Commodities Depression in 1980s and 1990s and driven by rising demands from emerging markets such as China and Russia. However, in 2008, the commodity prices fell drastically due to 2008 financial crisis. After the crash of commodity prices, several Pink tide leaders began to lose its popularity due to its dependence onon China's commodity trade turned out to be unsustainable as the national income diministed. The effect of commodity boom decline was also felt in other non Pink tide aligned countries such as Mexico, Colombia, Peru, and Chile which also have its economy dependent on mineral extractions.

During the commodity boom. Many Pink tide leaders such as Rafael Correa, Hugo Chávez and Evo Morales are able to use the profit from the commodity boom to fund social programmes. However once the decline of the commodity boom that affected the economy, most of Pink tide leaders unable to run their social programmes resulting overspending that caused economic and social crises. Many social crises later caused protests in most of Pink tide countries as well as Latin America countries that are not affiliated with it. His social policies resulted in overspending

=== 2010s oil glut ===
In 2014, crude oils began to experience surplus with trend accelerated further in 2016. The oil glut was seen as part of the commodity boom decline as well as geopolitical rivalries between oil producing nations. Oil was priced US$125 per barrel until at least 2014 where it entered downward spiral until 2016 when it rose back to $40s.

The 2010s oil glut was proven to be catastrophic for Latin American countries. In Venezuela, the overspending of Chávez social policies caused widespread shortages in Venezuela which later turned into hyperinflation due to scarcity of basic goods in the country. According to Cannon, the state income from oil revenue grew "from 51% of total income in 2000 to 56% 2006"; oil exports increased "from 77% in 1997 ... to 89% in 2006"; and his administration's dependence on petroleum sales was "one of the chief problems facing the Chávez government". However, exports that were non-oil collapsed in 2008. In 2012, the World Bank explained that Venezuela's economy is "extremely vulnerable" to changes in oil prices since in 2012. "96% of the country's exports and nearly half of its fiscal revenue" relied on oil production. In 2014, the crisis began to worsen and has been regarded as "the worst economic collapse outside of war since World War II".

In Ecuador, public debt was tripled due to the oil glut, as a result the government begin to use Central Bank of Ecuador reserve for fundings. In total, Ecuador was left $64 billion in debt and was losing $10 billion annually. As a result, Correa successor, Lenín Moreno began to launch austerity measures that includes the cut of fuel subsidies to save billion dollar. As a result, the move caused widespread protest and popularity of Moreno presidency.

=== Odebrecht case ===
Odebrecht case is widely known as one of the biggest corruption case in Latin America which spanned for more than 30 years. The case has started when Brazilian construction company Odebrecht bribed 12 countries which 10 countries they bribed are Latin American countries for public contract benefit.

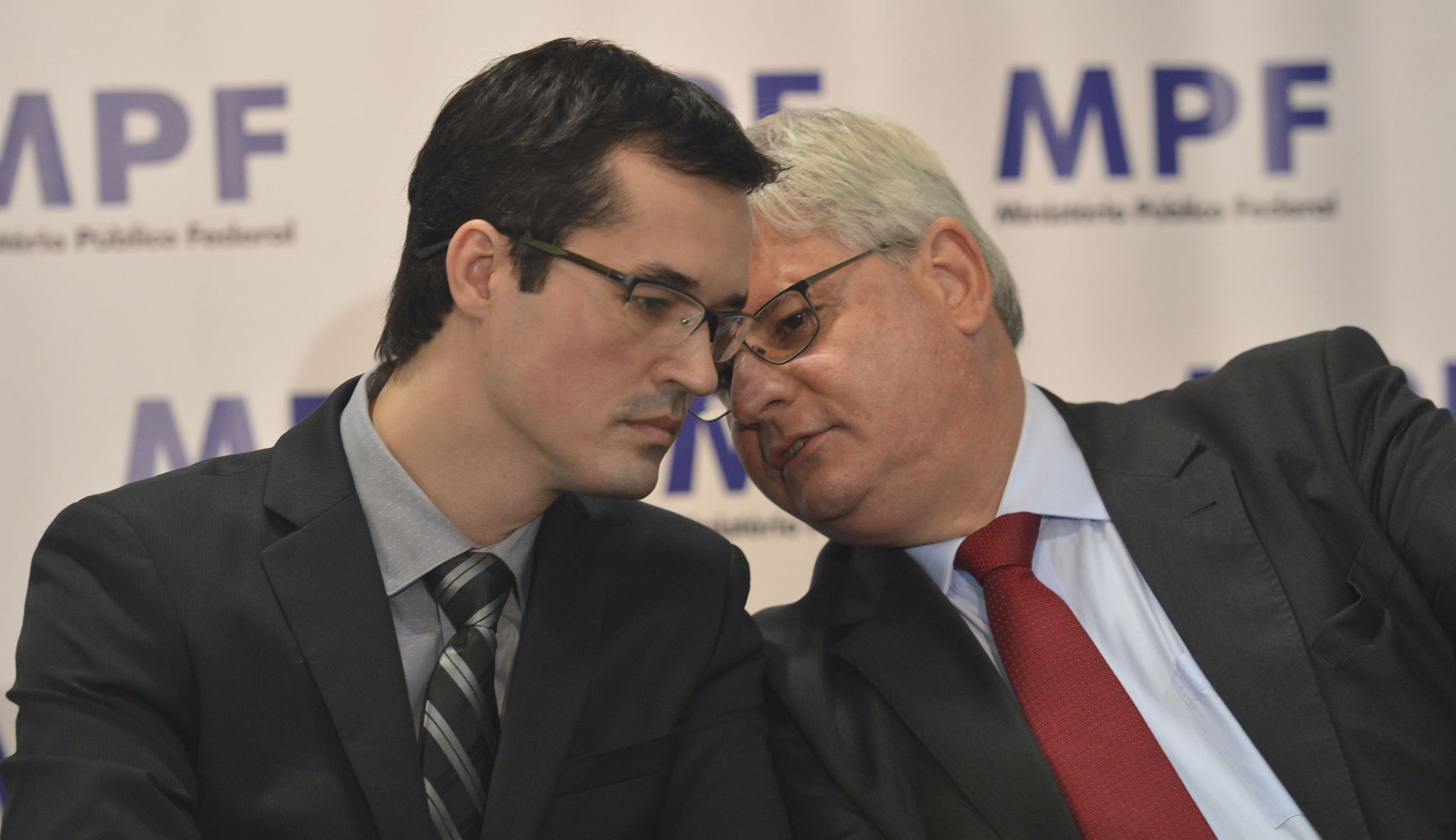
Prosecutors Deltan Dallagnol and Rodrigo Janot

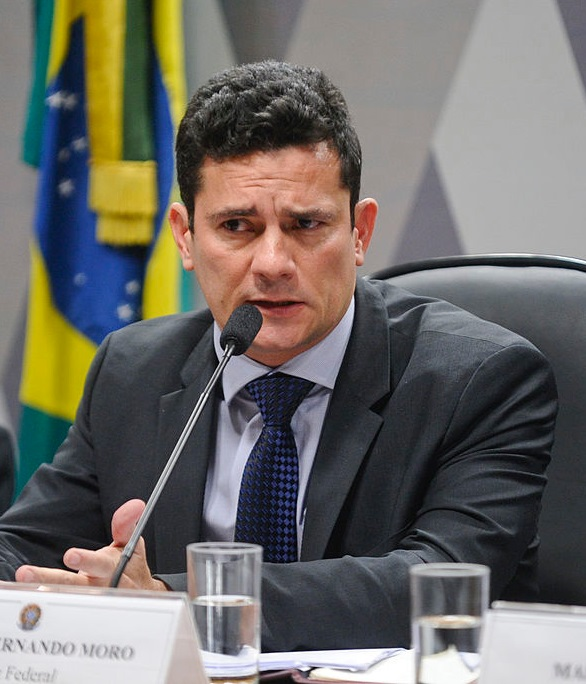
Judge Sergio Moro

The case has gained prominence when Brazilian Prosecutor Deltan Dallagnol and Judge Sergio Moro began opening an investigation of a small car wash operating in the capital Brasília Tha has been suspected as a front of money laundering. The case has indicted several political elites in the country including former presidents such as Fernando Collor de Mello, Luiz Inácio Lula da Silva, Dilma Rousseff (which led to her impeachment), and Michel Temer

According to United States Department of Justice, Venezuela is the biggest receiver of bribe from Odebrecht with total of US$98 million of bribes with most money being used for the Caracas Metro expansion project under Chávez regime which he contracted the firm in 2007. Odebrecht promised Chávez that the project will finish in 2015, however the project was not completed in time with only 3 of the proposed stations operating since 2016, Venezuelan Attorney General at the time, Luisa Ortega Díaz traveled to Brazil to follow up the case with Janot. After the death of Chávez, President Nicolás Maduro emphasized that the halted projects will be finished by a Venezuelan company. Venezuelan authorities also sparked international outcry when two Brazilian journalists Leandro Stoliar and Gilzon Sousa are detained and expelled while investigating the case in Maracaibo. The Venezuelan government handling of scandal has been regarded as one of the root cause ot public resentment which led to large protest in the country

== History ==
=== Prelude to the protest ===
In 2016 Pedro Pablo Kuczynski was elected as President of Peru succeeding Ollanta Humala. However, the divide between legislative(dominated by opposition Popular Force) and executive has caused clashes in the Peruvian political landscape. In 2017, Kuczynski was summoned by congress to explain his involvement in Operation Car Wash in which he was accused of covering up illegal payments of $782,000 from Odebrecht. As a result, Kuczynski resigned from the Presidency on 21 March 2018 and was succeeded by his vice president Martín Vizcarra. Unlike Kuczynski, Vizcarra take more confrontative approach against the congress and caused him to be removed from power after he was accused for planning a judicial coup, his removal caused a constitutional crisis.

In Venezuela, the administration of Nicolás Maduro who succeeded Hugo Chávez after his death in 2013 was marred with past problems which caused shortages and hyperinflation in the country due to social programmes overspending. Maduro implemented price control to fix the economy which however failed to save the economy as Venezuela entered recession and GDP decline in 2014. As a result of the economic crisis, PSUV was ended in a humiliating defeat in the 2015 parliamentary election which the opposition won the election for the first time since 1999. Prior to the election, peaceful protest began to emerge in 2014 and subsequently became violent in one point due to constant clashes between protesters and authorities. The government responded the election result by dissolving the National Assembly and summoned the Constituent Assembly to rewrite a new constitution which caused a constitutional crisis. The move was internationally condemned as consolidation of power which grant the president to rule indefinitely.

=== 2019 Latin American protests ===
In 2019, a larger scale protests began to emerge regional wide with protesters mainly complaining about inequality and corruption that have ravaged the region for long. British newspaper The Guardian began to discuss if the 2019 mass movement is the beginning of the "Latin America spring" in which later used by other media to describe the event as well. Mexican newspaper El Universal described the region as "red hot" due to the revolutionary wave at the time.

==== Colombia ====
On 21 November 2019, a group of protesters with estimated between 200,000 and over 1 million strong began a mass movement in Bogotá protesting the administration of Iván Duque Márquez. Inspired by neighboring Chile and Ecuador, protesters waved the flag of two countries as part of solidarity while chanting "South America wake up". Clashes between police and protesters occurred when a group of protesters tried to storm the Capitolio Nacional. Clashes also occurred in El Dorado International Airport and the National University of Bogotá. In Cali, the municipal government imposed curfew as violence escalated in the city.

At the beginning of 2020, government begin to work into meeting the protesters demand by meeting the trade union, students, and social movement to find a solution to the national problems on 13 January. However, the meeting did not produce any fruitful result, causing more mass strikes the following days.

==== Chile ====
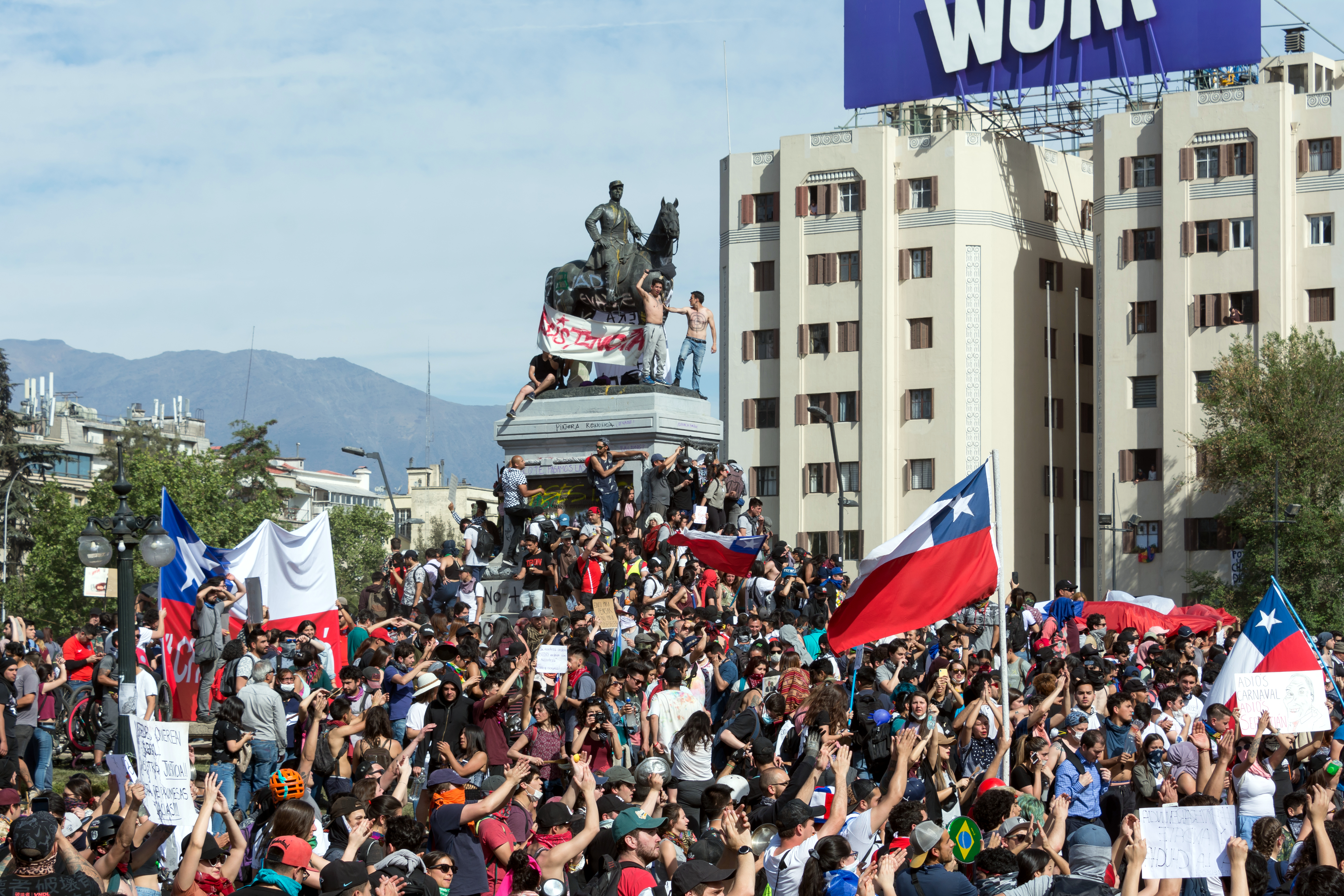
Protest in Plaza Baquedano, Santiago, Chile

On 7 October 2019, Chile experienced a massive protest which started in capital Santiago and spread to other cities. The protest was organized as a response to the fare hike of Santiago Metro along with cost of living crisis, corruption, privatization, and inequality. The protest began with a grouo of high school students organizing mass fare evasion of public transport. The movement sparked harsh reaction from the Carabineros de Chile after protesters took over the main train station in Santiago. After clashes with Carabineros, protest began to spiral into violence on 18 October which involves arson and vandalism against Santiago Metro stations, causing mass disruption of the services. As a response, President Sebastián Piñera announced the impoosition of state of emergency which authorize the involvement of Chilean Army and imposition of curfew.

After days of protest in Santiago, many other cities such as Concepción, San Antonio, and Valparaíso began to see similar mass movement. The movement however turned into anarchy as protesters began to loot shops in most Chilean cities. As a result, the state of emergency was expanded beyond Santiago metro area to several regions affected by the protests.
