= List of poems by Ivan Bunin =

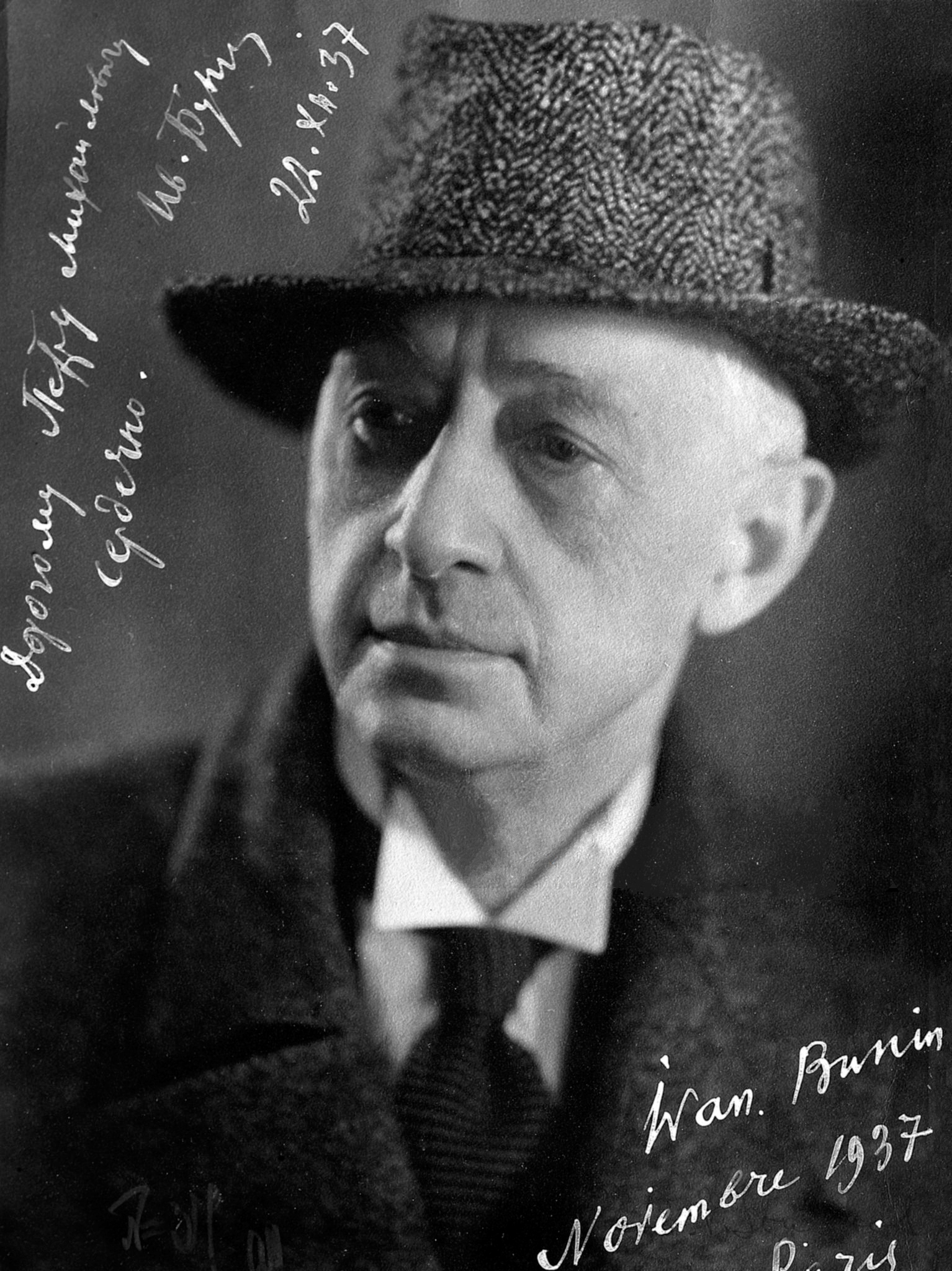
Ivan Bunin in 1937

Ivan Alekseyevich Bunin (Ива́н Алексе́евич Бу́нин; 22 October [O.S. 10 October] 1870 – 8 November 1953), the first Russian writer to win the Nobel Prize for Literature (1933), wrote more than 200 poems. The great majority of them were included into his 1900s collections: Poems (1887–1891), Under the Open Skies (1898), Falling Leaves (1901), Flowers of the Field (1901), Poems (1903), Poems (1903–1906) and Poems of 1907 (1908). Some appeared in short stories' collections (Poems and stories, 1900, Flowers of the Field, 1901, etc.).

Volumes 1 and 3 of 1915's The Works by I.A. Bunin were compilations of poems; some were included also into Volume 6. The Adolf Marks' edition represented the whole of Bunin's poetic legacy (as of 1915), starting with the Falling Leaves book's material. Since then Bunin's poems were appearing in his collections of short stories: Chalice of Life (1915), The Gentleman from San Francisco (1916) and Temple of the Sun (1917). Many of his poems (some revised) featured in three books published in emigration: Primal Love (1921), Chalice of Love (1922), Rose of Jerico (1924), Mitya's Love (1925). In 1929 the Selected Poems (1929) came out in Paris. There was little poetry, though, in The Complete Bunin in 1 volumes, published by Petropolis in 1934–1936.

== 1886–1899 ==
1886

- "Open wider, my chest..." (Шире, грудь, распахнись...). Dated March 28, 1886. First published in the Works by I.A. Bunin, 1st ed., 1915, Vol. 1.
- "The Poet" (Поэт). The Works by I.A. Bunin, 1st ed., Vol. 1.
- "Thoughtful crescent, deep in midnight..." (Месяц задумчивый, полночь глубокая...). Yuzhnoye Obozrenye (Southern Review) newspaper. Odessa. No.532, July 19, 1898, as "In July".
- "The Village Pauper" (Деревенский нищий). Bunin's first ever published poem. Rodina magazine, Saint Petersburg. No.20. May 17, 1887.
- "How sad, how quickly did it fade..." (Как печально, как скоро померкла...) Falling Leaves collection, 1901.

1887

- "Flowers of the Field" (Полевые цветы). Flowers of the Field collection, 1901.
- "At the Pond" (На пруде). Under the Open Skies, 1901.
- "In the darkening fields, like in the boundless seas..." (В темнеющих полях, как в безграничном море...). Under the Open Skies, 1898.
- "Moon's crescent, under longish cloud..." (Серп луны под тучкой длинной...). Falling Leaves, 1901.
- "The Calm" (Затишье). Knizhki Nedeli (Books of the Week) magazine, No.9, Saint Petersburg. September 1898, untitled.
- "October Sunrise" (Октябрьский рассвет). Under the Open Skies, 1901.
- "Full moon is high..." (Высоко полный месяц стоит...) Detskoye Tchtenye (Reading for Children) magazine, No.11, 1897, Moscow, as "The Night" (Ночь).
- "I remember a long winter evening..." (Помню – долгий зимний вечер...). Knizhki Nedeli, January 1889, No.1.

1888

- "Such warm and dark a dawn..." (Какая тёплая и тёмная заря...) Poems, 1887–1991, 1891.
- "The night gets pale. The veil of mists..." (Бледнеет ночь. Туманов пелена...) Poems, 1887–1991, 1891.
- "Asters are crumbling in gardens..." (Осыпаются астры в садах...). Knizhki nedeli, 1888, No.10, October.
- "As a child I loved this twilight in the church..." (Любил я в детстве сумрак в храме...) Knizhki nedeli, 1888, No.7, July.
- "Don't you frighten me with thunder..." (Не пугай меня грозою...) Knizhki nedeli, 1888, No.12, December.
- "A cloud has melted. Humid warmth..." (Туча растаяла. Влажным теплом...) Under the Open Skies, 1898.
- "The autumn wind rises up in the woods..." (Ветер осенний в лесах подымается...) Mir Bozhiy, Saint Petersburg, 1898, No.10, October.
- "I leave alone my house at midnight..." (В полночь выхожу один из дома...) Posledniye novosti, 1935, No.5334, October 31, along with 11 more poems, all noted as "previously unpublished".
- "The desert and sorrow of steppes..." (Пустыня, грусть в степных просторах...) Posledniye novosti, 1935, No.5334, October 31.

1889

- "Severe and snowy is everything around me... (Как всё вокруг сурово, снежно...) Posledniye novosti, 1935, No.5334, October 31.
- "Sound of an organ makes one's soul ache..." (Под орган душа тоскует...) Posledniye novosti, 1935, No.5334, October 31.
- "At the cliff under the skies, where storms..." (На поднебесном утесе, где бури...) Posledniye novosti, 1935, No.5334, October 31.
- "The Gypsy" (Цыганка). The Works by I.A. Bunin, 1915, Vol. 1.
- "Not a sight of birds. The ailing forest…" (Не видно птиц. Покорно чахнет...) Mir Bozhiy, 1898, No.10, October. According to Maxim Gorky, this poem became great favourite with Leo Tolstoy.
- "Grey sky is above me..." (Седое небо надо мной...) Posledniye novosti, 1935, No.5334, October 31.
- "Far beyond the sea..." (Далёко за морем...) Severny Vestnik, 1898, No.7, July.
- "Alone I am at the outset of the joyful week..." (Один встречаю я дни радостной недели...) Falling Leaves, 1901.
- "A sudden rain, for half an hour covered..." (Как дымкой даль полей закрыв на полчаса...) Nablyudatel (The Watcher) magazine, Saint Petersburg, 1891, No.6, July.
- "In Steppes" (В степи) Yuzhnoye Obozrenye, 1899, No.853, July 3. Originally with a note: "A tribute to Belinsky". In later editions it was dedicated to Nikolay Teleshov.
- "In Kostyol" (В костёле). Niva, 1896, No.8, February 24. Written after visiting kostels in Vitebsk, the fact being mentioned in The Life of Arseniev (book V, chapter XVI) and in Vera Muromtseva's The Life of Bunin.

1890

- "What is the use of talking, and of what..." (Зачем и о чем говорить?..) Orlovsky Vestnik newspaper, 1891, No.22, January 22.
- "Late summer..." (Поздним летом...) Poems 1887–1891, 1891.
- "An Imitation of Pushkin" (Подражание Пушкину). The Works by I.A.Bunin, 1915, Vol.1

1891

- "In a cloud that blocks the sunshine..." (В туче, солнце заступающей...) Poslednye Novosty, 1935. No.5334, October 31.
- "That star that's been wobbling in dark water..." (Ту звезду, что качалася в тёмной воде...) Mir Bozhiy, 1901. No.11, November, under the title The Bygones (Былое). Maxim Gorky spoke of how Bunin impressed him with his own rendition of this poem while on Capri in 1909.
- "No, it's not this that makes me sad..." (Нет, не о том я сожалею...) Mir Bozhiy, 1893, No.5, May.
- "The Angel" (Ангел). Detskoye Chtenye, 1901, No.8, August, as "The Angel of the Evening".
- "To Motherland" (Родине) Yuzhnoye Obozrenye, 1898, No.603, October 4.
- "Forest and clear azure sky looks..." (Лес – и ясно-лазурное небо глядится...) Sever (North) magazine, 1897, No.22 June 1, as "From the Songs of Spring".

1892

- "Each day the pines get fresher and younger..." (Свежеют с каждым днём и молодеют сосны...) Vestnik Evropy, 1893, No.7, July. In the 1915 Works by I.A. Bunin featured as "In February" and dedicated to Aleksey Zhemchuzhnikov.
- "The raging waters off the fields..." (Бушует полая вода...) Vestnik Evropy, 1893. No.7, July.
- "Light April evening has expired..." (Догорел апрельский светлый вечер...) Vestnik Evropy, 1893. No.7, July.
- "Nightingales" (Соловьи) Vestnik Evropy, 1893. No.7, July, untitled.
- "Evening fades, horizons dark and blue..." (Гаснет вечер, даль синеет...) Under the Open Skies, 1898.
- "There are still shades..." (Ещё от дома на дворе...) Vestnik Evropy, 1893, No.7, July.

1893

- "For Spring-time" (Весеннее) Mir Bozhiy, 1898, No.4, April, as "From the Songs of Spring".
- "Far away from my home..." (В стороне далекой от родного края...) Russkoye Bogatstvo, 1900, No.12, December.
- "Beyond the river, meadows, now green..." (За рекой луга зазеленели) Sever, 1898, No.19, May 10.
- "Trinity" (Троица). Poems and Stories (1900).
- "Drop-heavy rain in green forest..." (Крупный дождь в лесу зелёном...) Zhiznh i Iskusstvo (Life and Art) newspaper, Kiev, 1898, No.323, November 22.
- "In the Train" (В поезде). Under the Open Sky. Having received the book from the author, Gorky praised it lavishly in a letter, calling it 'the purest kind of poetry'.
- "The night approaches and the pale blue East..." (Ночь идёт – и темнеет...) Poems and Stories (1900), as "The Night".
- "And I dreamed how one autumn..." (И снилося мне, что осенней порой...) Vestnik Evropy, 1894, No.6, June.
- "Mother" (Мать). Mir Bozhiy, 1898, No.1, January. Written about Bunin's mother, Lyudmila Aleksandrovna (1834–1901) who, after the family got bankrupt, had to move to their relatives's house. "Seeing how hard it was for her to live in somebody else's home, I wrote this and sent it to her, just to make her feel better", Bunin remembered.

1894

- "Kovyl" (Ковыль) Trud (Labour) magazine, Saint Petersburg. No.5, May, originally as "In Southern Steppes". Epigraph ("What is it that rattles…") is taken from The Tale of Igor's Campaign.
- "In the Garden of Gethsemane" (В Гефсиманском саду). Sever, 1897. No.14, April 6, untitled.
- "Graves, windmills, roads and mounds…" (Могилы, ветряки, дороги и курганы...) Zhurnal Dlya Vsekh, 1900, No.12, December, as "The Night at Steppes" (Степная ночь).
- "The ether light has flown overground…" (Неуловимый свет разлился над землею...) Vestnik Evropy, 1894, No.6, June.
- "If only one could…" (Если б только можно было...) Sever, 1898, No.27, July 5.
- "The naked steppe brings winds of deserts…" (Нагая степь пустыней веет...) Falling Leaves, 1901.

1895

- "What if somewhere, on a distant shore…" (Что в том, что где-то, на далеком...) Vozrozhdenye, 1926, No. 355, May 23. With three more poems, under the common title "The Old Notebook".
- "Bonfire" (Костер). Trud, 1895, No.11, November, originally as In The Autumn Woods (В осеннем лесу).
- "When slumber descends upon a darkened town…" (Когда на темный город сходит...) Mir Bozhiy, 1898, No. 2, February, as "The Nightly Blizzard" (Ночная вьюга).
- "The night has come, the day is gone..." (Ночь наступила, день угас...) Mir Bozhiy, 1897, No.12, December.
- "On a Country Road" (На просёлке). Under the Open Skies, 1898.
- "It was long, in the nightly darkness..." (Долог был во мраке ночи...) Niva, 1896. No.19, May 11, as "Amidsts the Seas" (В море).
- "Snowstorm" (Метель). Poems and Stories, 1900.
- "From a darkened berth's window..." (В окошко из темной каюты...) Vozrozhdenye, 1926, No.355, May 23.

1896

- "Motherland" (Родина). Russkoye bogatstvo, 1898, No.4, April, as "At the North" (На севере).
- "The night and distant greyness..." (Ночь и даль седая...). Under the Open Skies, 1898, as "Stars" (Звёзды).
- "Christ resurrected! And again on dawn..." (Христос воскрес! Опять с зарёю...). Under the Open Skies, 1898.
- "On Dnieper River" (На Днепре). Zhiznh, 1900, No.9, September. Was published with 7 more poems as part of the "Watercolors" (Акварели) poetry cycle.
- "Sypresses" (Кипарисы). Yuzhnoe obozrenye, 1899, No.707, January 21.
- "I'm delighted when your blue eyes..." (Счастлив я, когда ты голубые...). Monthly Niva literary supplement, 1896, No.9, September.
- "Jigsaw road among the snows..." (Вьется путь в снегах, в степи широкой...) Russkoye bogatstvo, 1900, No.11, November, as "Winter Day" (Зимний день).
- "Why you are so sad, the evening sky..." (Отчего ты печально, вечернее небо...) Mir Bozhiy, 1900, No.8, August, as "In the Seas" (В море).

1897

- "Northern Sea" (Северное море). Under the Open Skies, 1898.
- "At Khutor" (На хуторе). Zhurnal Dlya Vsekh, 1899, No.1, January. About the poet's father, Aleksey Nikolayevich Bunin (1824–1906) who used to play guitar and sing Russian folk songs rather expressively, to a strong dramatic effect.
- "Pristyaznaya capers, shooting out snow..." (Скачет пристяжная, снегом обдаёт...) Zhiznh i Iskusstvo, 1898, No.329, November 28.
- "Three Nights" (Три ночи) Nablyudatel, 1890, No.8, August.

1898

- "I take your hand and look for a while..." (Беру твою руку и долго смотрю на неё...) Poslednye novosty, 1935, No.5334, October 31.
- "It's late, the Moon reclined..." (Поздно, склонилась луна...) Vozrozhdenye, 1926, No.355, May 23.
- "I entered her room at the midnight hour..." (Я к ней вошёл в полночный час...) Poslednye novosti, 1935, No.5334, October 31.
- "Stars fade as these eyes shine..." (При свете звёзд померкших глаз сиянье...) Poslednye novosty, No.5334, October 31.
- "Again the sleep, enchanting and sweet..." (Снова сон, пленительный и сладкий...) Yuzhnoye obozrenye, 1898, No.525, July 12.
- "Stars get tender in spring..." (Звезды ночью весенней нежнее...) Zhurnal Dlya Vsekh, 1901, No.1, January.
- "On the Far North" (На дальнем севере). Mir Bozhiy, 1900, No.11, November, untitled.
- "Pleiades" (Плеяды). Mir Bozhiy, 1898. No.10, October, untitled.
- "And once again on every dawn..." (И вот опять уж по зарям...) Mir Bozhiy No.10, October, untitled.
- "Leaves falling in the garden..." (Листья падают в саду...) The Works by I.A.Bunin, Vol. 1.
- "The forest silence gives mysterious purr..." (Таинственно шумит лесная тишина...) Knizhki Nedeli, 1990, No.9, September, as "Autumn" (Осень).
- "Up in the empty skies..." (В пустынной вышине...) Poems (1903).

1899

- "The day gets darkened, while..." (Всё лес и лес. А день темнеет...) Zhiznh, 1900, No.9, September, originally as "From the Fairytale" (Из сказки).
- "How bright, how smartly dressed is the spring..." (Как светла, как нарядна весна...) Zhurnal dlya vsekh, 1900, No.12, December. Was put to music by Sergey Rakhmaninov.
- "This night somebody sang..." (Нынче ночью кто-то долго пел...) Zhurnal dlya vsekh, 1900, No.12, December.
- "The greensome light of lonesome moonlight night..." (Зеленоватый свет пустынной лунной ночи...) Zhurnal Dlya Vsekh, 1900, No.11, November, as "The Autumn Night" (Осенняя ночь).

== 1900–1902 ==
- "On the hillside sleeping forest, full of foreboding mysteries..." (Враждебных полон тай на взгорье спящий лес...) Selected Poems, 1929.
- "Starry skies are in a flurry..." (Затрепетали звёзды в небе...) Zhurnal Dlya Vsekh, 1901, No.5, May, as "Evening in Spring".
- "There is no Sun, but ponds are light..." (Нет солнца, но светлы пруды...). Flowers of the Field, 1901, as "At Pentecost". Included into the Poems (1903) under the title "Happiness" (Счастье) and with a dedication to Pyotr Nilus.
- "Falling Leaves" (Листопад). Zhiznh, Saint Petersburg, 1901, No.10. Subtitled "The Autumn Poem" and with dedication to Maxim Gorky. The poem gave its title to the 1901 poetry collection which brought its author the Pushkin Prize in 1903.
- "At the Crossroads" (На распутье). Knizhki Nedeli. 1900, No.10, October. Inspired by A Knight at the Crossroards, the painting by Viktor Vasnetsov. Included into the Falling Leaves collection with dedication to the latter. Put to music by Alexander Gretchaninov.
- "Virh" (Вирь). Zhiznh, 1900, No.9, September.
- "The Last Thunderstorm" (Последняя гроза) Mir Bozhiy, 1900, No.9, September.
- "In the Distant Field" (В отъезжем поле) Zhiznh, 1900, No.9, September. Featured in the Falling Leaves collection, as dedicated to Valery Bryusov.
- "After the Flood" (После половодья) Zhiznh, 1900, No.9, September.
- "The birches get darker and curlier..." (Всё темней и кудрявей берёзовый лес зеленеет...) Zhiznh, 1900, No.9, September, originally as "In May" (В мае).
- "The distant sunset not expired yet..." (Не угас ещё вдали закат...) Zhiznh, 1900, No. 9, September, originally as "Young Moon" (Молодой месяц).
- "As trees, on a bright May day..." (Когда деревья, в светлый майский день...) Kurjer (The Courier) newspaper, 1901, No.18, January 18.
- "The forest's muffled hum is even..." (Лес шумит невнятным ровным шумом...) Zhiznh, 1900, No.12, December, as "The Back of Beyond" (Глушь).
- "It thunders in the distance still..." (Вдали ещё гремит, но тучи уж свалились...) Mir Bozhiy, 1900, No.8, August, as "In the Forests Over the Desna River" (В лесах над Десною).
- "Morning is still a long, long time..." (Ещё утро не скоро, не скоро...) Zhiznh, 1900, No.12, December, under the title "Before Dawn" (Перед зарёю).
- "At Sunset" (По вечерней заре) Mir Bozhiy, 1900, No.8, August.
- "The night's as sad as my own dreams..."' (Ночь печальна, как мечты мои...) Zhurnal Dlya Vsekh, 1900, No.8, August. Set to music by Sergey Rakhmaninov and Reinhold Gliere (separately).
- "Dawn" (Рассвет) Mir Bozhiy, 1900, No.8, August, originally as "The Morning" (Утро).
- "The Wellspring" (Родник) Flowers of the Field, 1901.
- "Uchan-Su" (Учан-Су) Mir Bozhiy, 1900. No.8, August.
- "Heatwave" (Зной). Zhiznh, No.11, November.
- "Sunset" (Закат). Zhiznh, No.9, September.
- "Dusk" (Сумерки). Mir Bozhiy, No.1, January.
- "Dead anchor's got sea-marked..." (На мёртвый якорь кинули бакан...) Zhiznh, No.11, November, as "In the Storm" (В бурю).
- "Long alley leading down to the shore..." (К прибрежью моря длинная аллея...) Mir Bozhiy, No.11, November.
- "Gold stubblefields are open wide..." (Открыты жнивья золотые...) Zhurnal Dlya Vsekh, 1901, No.1, January.
- "The hour was late, then all of a sudden..." (Был поздний час. И вдруг над темнотою...) Kurjer, 1901, No.207, July 29.
- "Green colour of the sea..." (Зелёный цвет морской воды...) Mir Bozhiy, 1901, No.11, November, originally as "At the Dawn" (На рассвете).

1901

- "Blue skies have opened up..." (Раскрылось небо голубое...) Mir Bozhiy, No.9, September.
- "Heat-lightning's image, like a dream..." (Зарницы лик, как сновиденье...) Mir Bozhiy, 1901, No.8, August, as "Heat-lightnings" (Зарницы).
- "Lovely blue eyes, as dusk descends..." (На глазки синие, прелестные...) Narodnoye Slovo (People's Word) newspaper, 1918, No.20, May 4, originally as "Lullaby" (Колыбельная). Written for Ivan Bunin and Anna Tzakhni's son Kolya (1900–1905). According to Vera Muromtseva, there were other poems of this kind, "...strikingly poignant. He's recited them to me, but never published any", she wrote in her memoirs.
- "Night and Day" (Ночь и день). Mir Bozhiy, 1901, No.12, December.
- "The Stream" (Ручей). Mir Bozhiy, 1901, No.9, September.
- "On a snowy peak..." (На высоте, на снеговой вершине...) Russkaya Mysl, 1902, No.2, February, as "In Alps" (В Альпах), sub-titled "Sonnet on Ice".
- "The air still cold and moist..." (Ещё и холоден и сыр...) Zhurnal Dlya Vsekh, 1902, No.1, January, as "Thaw" (Оттепель).
- "High in vast skies..." (Высоко в просторах неба...) Russkaya Mysl, 1902, No.6, June.
- "Tender pearls, gift of seas, they're so sweet to me..." (Мил мне жемчуг нежный, чистый дар морей...) Mir Bozhiy, 1902, No.6, June.
- "The field's in smoke. Sunset gets whiter..." (Дымится поле. Рассвет белеет...) Russkaya Mysl, 1901, No.8, August, as "Off the Mould" (С кургана).
- "The thunderstorm have passed the forest by..." (Гроза прошла над лесом стороною...) Zhizn, 1901. No.7, July.
- "In the Old Town" (В старом городе). Mir Bozhiy, 1901, No.7, July.
- "Lights of sunset moved further to the North..." (Отошли закаты на далёкий север...) Kurjer, 1901, No.179, July 1.
- "Clouds, like ghosts of ruins..." (Облака, как призраки развалин...) Kurjer, 1901, No.179, July 1.
- "Those were the nights of northern May..." (Стояли ночи северного мая...) Zhurnal Dlya Vsekh, 1901, No.8, August, as "At Night" (Ночью).
- "At Monastery Graveyard" (На монастырском кладбище). Kurjer, 1902, No.2, January 2.
- "The Cedar" (Кедр). The New Poems (1902).
- "Late at night, we were in the fields together..." (В поздний час мы были с нею в поле...) Mir Bozhiy, 1901, No.8, August, as "The Fragment" (Отрывок).
- "The Night" (Ночь). Russkaya Mysl, 1902, No.1, January.
- "Your tranquil doe-like eyes..." (Спокойный взор, подобный взору лани...) Zhurnal Dlya Vsekh, 1901, No.6, June.
- "For everything I thank you, God..." (За всё тебя, господь, благодарю!..) Mir Bozhiy, No.7, July, as "At Sunset" (На закате).
- "High above our flag, it flutters..." (Высоко наш флаг трепещет...) The New Poems (1902), as "In the Sea" (В море).
- "The Morning" (Утро) Detskoye Tchtenye, 1901, No.7, July.
- "Spring caddisfly" (Веснянка). Monthly literary supplement to Niva magazine. 1901, No.12, December, originally as "Thunderstorm" (Гроза).
- "The field's aromas, cool grass' breath..." (Полями пахнет – свежих трав...) The New Poems (1902), as Under the Cloud (Под тучей).
- "The star above dark distant forests..." (Звезда над тёмными далёкими лесами...) Detskoye Tchtenye, 1901. No.6, June.
- "The Gravestone Scripture" (Надпись на могильной плите) Zhurnal Dlya Vsekh, 1901, No.8, August.
- "From The Apocalypse" (Из Апокалипсиса) Zhurnal Dlya Vsekh, 1902, No.3, March, originally as "Thank God" (Слава господу), subtitled "The Apocalypse, Ch. IV".
- "While I was walking, I was so small..." (Пока я шёл, я был так мал...) Monthly literary supplement to Niva magazine. 1901, No.9, September, as "On the Mountains" (На горах).
- "From canyon's narrow schism..." (Из тесной пропасти ущелья...) Mir Bozhiy, 1901, No.11, November, as "Sky Glimpses" (Просветы).
- "Beyond the trees there'no thunder heard..." (Не слыхать ещё тяжкого грома за лесом...) Zhurnal Dlya Vsekh, 1901. No.7, July, as "In July" (В июле).
- "He loved dark nights in tents..." (Любил он ночи тёмные в шатре...) Mir Bozhiy, 1901, No.8, as "The Mould" (Курган).
- "It was the dull and heavy time..." (Это было глухое, тяжелое время...) Mir Bozhiy, No.8, August, as "The Dream of Flowers" (Сон цветов).
- "My grief has calmed down..." (Моя печаль теперь спокойна) Kurjer, 1901, No.270, September 30.
- "Cold stars of autumn night..." (Звезды ночи осенней, холодные звёзды...) Mir Bozhiy, 1901, No.11, November, as "Autumn" (Осень).
- "Leaves rustled as they fell..." (Шумели листья, облетая...) Kurjer, 1902, No.270, September 30.
- "It's light as daylight, and the shadow follows us..." (Светло, как днём, и тень за нами бродит...) Poems, 1903.
- "The unquiet crescent watches..." (Смотрит месяц ненастный, как сыплются листья...) Zhurnal Dlya Vsekh, 1902, No.1, January.
- "The Fragment" (Отрывок) Mir Bozhiy, 1902, No.1, January, as "From the Diary" (Из дневника).
- "Epithalamium" (Эпиталама). Zhurnal Dlya Vsekh, 1901, No.9, September, with a dedication to Konstantin Balmont.
- "Snowstorms's frosty breath..." (Морозное дыхание метели...) New Poems, 1902.
- "Bushes tremble with black rigid rustling leaves..." (Жёсткой, чёрной листвой шелестит и трепещет кустарник...) Russkaya Mysl, 1901, No.11, November, as "Blizzard".
- "On the Island" (На острове). Na Trudovom Tuti (On the Labour Path) almanac. 1901.
- "I won't tire of singing you, stars..." (Не устану воспевать вас, звезды...) Mir Bozhiy, 1901, No.11, November, as "The Eternal (Вечное).
- "Epiphany night" (Крещенская ночь) Detskoye Tchtenye, 1901, No.1, January.

1902

- "Before the sunset, a cloud appeared..." (Перед закатом набежало...) Mir Bozhiy, 1902, No.8, August, as "The First Love" (Первая любовь).
- "Sad scarlet Moon..." (Багряная печальная луна...) Mir Bozhiy, 1902, No.10, October, as "On the Outskirts of Sivash" (На окраинах Сиваша).
- "Death" (Смерть). Mir Bozhiy, 1902, No.8, August.
- "The Forest Road" (Лесная дорога) Russkaya mysl, 1902, No.8, August.
- "On the Lake" (На озере) Russkaya Mysl, 1902, No.7, July.
- "When heaving froth wreathes by the board of a ship..." (Когда вдоль корабля, качаясь, вьётся пена...) Mir Bozhiy, 1902, No.8, August, originally as "In the Sea" (В море).
- "Even if you'd have made peace, come together again..." (Если б вы и сошлись, если б вы и смирилися...) Mir Bozhiy, 1902, No.8, August. According to Vera Muromtseva, the poem was addressed to Anna Tzakni, the poet's first wife.
- "Goddess of sadness gave me this chalice of dark wine..." (Чашу с тёмным вином подала мне богиня печали...) Mir Bozhiy, 1902, No.8, August.
- "A Cross in the valley by the roadside..." (Крест в долине при дороге...) Zhurnal Dlya Vsekh, 1902, No.9, September.
- "How placid is everything and how bare..." (Как всё спокойно и как всё открыто...) Zhurnal Dlya Vsekh, 1902, No.9, September, originally as "Autumn" (Осень).
- "Tramps" (Бродяги) Obrazovanye (Education) magazine, 1902, No.10, October.
- "Forgotten Fountain" (Забытый фонтан). Russkaya Mysl, No.9, September, as "Autumn Days" (Осенние дни).
- "Epitaph" (Эпитафия). Kurjer, 1902, No.144. May 26, as "At the Graveyard" (На кладбище).
- "A Winter Day in Oberland" (Зимний день в Оберланде) Russkaya Mysl, 1902, No.10, October. In November 1900 Bunin along with painter Vladimir Kurovsky made a trip to Switzerland. Details of their 4-hour walk in the mountains were related in Ivan Bunin's letter to brother Yuli (published in Novy Mir magazine, 1956, No.10, p. 208)
- "Condor" (Кондор) Mir Bozhiy, 1902, No.9, September.
- "Between the oakwood peaks..." (Широко меж вершин дубравы...) Itogi anthology, 1903, as "Midday" (Полдень).

== 1903–1906 ==
1903

- "Northern Birch" (Северная берёза). Fakely (Torches) almanac, Book I, Saint Petersburg, 1906. Authorised date: "15.I.02".
- "Portrait" (Портрет). Zolotoye Runo (Golden Fleece) magazine, Moscow. 1906, No.5, May.
- "Frost" (Мороз). Znanye (Knowledge) anthology. Saint Petersburg, 1906. Book IX. "21.VII.03".
- "Burning dawns scorch with North-East winds..." (Норд-остом жгут пылающие зори...). Severnye Zapisky (Northern Notes) magazine, Saint Petersburg. 1914, No.2, February, as "Nord-Ost" (Норд-ост). "25.VIII.03".
- "After the Battle" (После битвы). Pravda magazine, Moscow, 1905, Nos., September–October. "31.VIII.03".
- "On the window, silver from hoarfrost..." (На окне, серебряном от инея...) Znanye, Vol. IX, 1906, as "Chrysanths" (Хризантемы).
- "Ghost of Oden in the morning dusk..." (В сумраке утра проносится призрак Одина...) Zarnitzy compilation, St.P., Vol.1., 1908, as "Oden". "30.XII.03".
- "The Wife of Aziz" (Жена Азиза). Yuznoye Slovo, 1919, No.51, October 20.
- "Kovserh" (Ковсерь). Znanye, Book VII, 1905, originally as "Mirage" (Мираж).
- "Stars are burning above the empty land..." (Звёзды горят над безлюдной землёю...) Znanye, Book VII. 1905, as "The Genie" (Джинн).
- "The Night of Al-Cadr" (Ночь Аль-Кадра). Probuzhdenye (The Awakening) magazine, Saint Petersburg, 1906, No.7, April 1, as "The Milky River" (Млечная река).
- "Capella on the far North..." (Далеко на севере Капелла...) Znanye, Book I, 1904, as "At Home" (Дома).
- "I awoke suddenly, without a reason..." (Проснулся я внезапно, без причины...) Mir Bozhiy, 1905, No.10, October.
- "An old man winnowed by his house..." (Старик у хаты веял, подкидывал лопату...) Zarnitzy, Vol.1, 1908.
- "The hop gets dry..." (Уж подсыхает хмель на тыне...) Zhurnal Dlya Vsekh, the monthly version. 1905, No.10, as "September" (Сентябрь)
- "There, on the sun, the fishermen's buckets rest..." (Там, на припёке, спят рыбацкие ковши...) Zhurnal Dlya Vsekh, the monthly version. 1903, No.11, November. As "В Плавнях".
- "First utrennik, the silver morning frost..." (Первый утренник, серебряный мороз!..) Zhurnal Dlya Vsekh, the monthly version. 1906, No.9, September. As "Utrennik".
- "The Yaila's cliff. Like furies' hands..." (Обрыв Яйлы. Как руки фурий...) Zolotoye Runo. 1906, Nos.7-9, July–September, as "Off the Cliff" (С обрыва).
- "The Eve of Kupala" (Канун Купалы) Zhurnal Dlya Vsekh, the monthly version. 1904, No.7, July.
- "Myra" (Мира). The Poems (1903–1906).
- "Deeza" (Диза). Znanye, Vol.I. 1904.
- "Inscription on a Chalice" (Подпись на чаше). Znanye, Vol.VI. 1905, untitled.
- "The Poet's Grave" (Могила поэта). Zhurnal Dlya Vsekh, the monthly version. 1905, No.7, July.
- "The Ring" (Кольцо). Znanye, Vol. 1, 1904.
- "Desolation" (Запустение). Znanye, Vol.1, 1904. As "By the Oka River" (Под Окой).
- "Solitude" (Одиночество). Znanye, Vol. IX, 1906. Dedicated to Pyotr Nilus. In 1910 Bunin's recital of the poem was recorded for a grammophone record.
- "A Shadow" (Тень). Mir Bozhy, 1903, No.11, November, untitled.
- "Doves" (Голуби). Zhurnal Dlya Vsekh, the monthly version. 1903, No.11, November.
- "Dusk" (Сумерки). Znanye, Vol.I, 1904.
- "Before the Storm" (Перед бурей). Znanye, Vol.I, 1904.
- "In the Crimea Steppes" (В Крымских степях). Znanye, Vol.I, 1904, as "In Yevpatorian Steppes" (В Евпаторийских степях).

1904

- "Jasmine" (Жасмин). Novoye Slovo, 1907, No.1, as Kazbek (Казбек).
- "The Pole Star" (Полярная звезда). Fakely anthology, as The Pole (Полюс)
- "It runs up in darkness..." (Набегает впотьмах...) Znanye, Vol.IX, 1906, as Life (Жизнь).
- "Crossroads" (Перекресток). Zhurnal Dlya Vsekh, the monthly version'. 1904, No.11, untitled.
- "Balder" (Бальдер). Mir Bozhiy, 1906, No.7, July.
- "Lights of the Skies" (Огни небес). Mir Bozhiy, 1904, No.8, August, as The Extinct Stars (Угасшие звёзды).
- "Ruins" (Развалины). Pravda magazine, 1904, No.11, November.
- "The Slope" (Косогор). Russkaya Mysl, 1904, No.11, November, untitled.
- "The Flood" (Разлив). Mir Bozhy, 1904, No.9, September.
- "Fairytale" (Сказка). Pravda magazine, Moscow, 1904, No.1, January.
- "Roses" (Розы). Pravda magazine, 1904, No.6, June.
- "At the Lighthouse" (На маяке). Mir Bozhy, 1904, No.11, November, untitled.
- "In the Mountains" (В горах). Pravda magazine, 1904, No.2, February.
- "The Calm" (Штиль). Pravda magazine, 1904, No.12, December.
- "On the White Sands" (На белых песках). Mir Bozhy, 1904, No.11, November, untitled.
- "Samson" (Самсон). Mir Bozhy, 1904, No.12, December, as Blindness (Слепота).
- "Mountain Slope" (Склон гор). Zhurnal Dlya Vsekh, the monthly version. 1904, No.8, August, untitled.
- "Sapsan" (Сапсан). Mir Bozhy, 1904, No.4, April. Subtitled: "The Poem" (Поэма). M.K.Kuprina-Yordanskaya remembered that Aleksander Kuprin liked this one a lot and eagerly published it in Mir Bozhy. The poem also impressed Maxim Gorky. "I see Gorky every day... During these days I’ve gave him the poetrymania bug, first killing him with Sapsan", Bunin wrote in a letter to A.M.Fyodorov on April 25, 1905, from Yalta. Aleksander Blok wrote: "Only the poet who's imbibed the Puskin verse with all of its exactness and simplicity could write such words about sapsan, the alleged bird of Evil... (Blok quoted 8 lines of the poem beginning with words: "It might have heard today..." ).

1905

- "Russian Spring" (Русская весна). Zhurnal Dlya Vsekh, the monthly version, 1905, No.3, March, as "The Spring".
- "The living room, through trees and dusty curtains..." (В гостиную, сквозь сад и пыльные гардины...) Znanye, Vol.IX, 1906, as "Dust" (Прах).
- "The old man sat resignedly..." (Старик сидел, покорно и уныло...) Poems (1903–1906), as "The Old Man". "23.VII.05"
- "Autumn. Forest thickets..." (Осень. Чащи леса...) Poems (1903–1906). As "Alder" (Ольха).
- "The pages of the open book are running on and on..." (Бегут, бегут листы раскрытой книги...) Znanye, book XXI, 1908, as "Daily Routine" (Будни). Here with four more short poems it formed the cycle Rus (Русь).
- "We've met by chance, on the corner..." (Мы встретились случайно, на углу...) Poems (1903–1906), as "The New Spring" (Новая весна).
- "The Fire on a Mast" (Огонь на мачте). Poems (1903–1906).
- "The whole of the see is like a pearly mirror..." (Всё море как жемчужное зерцало...) Zolotoye Runo, 1906, Nos.7-9, as "After the Rain" (После дождя).
- "In a mountain, among the forest trees, a spring, lively and loud..." (В лесу, в горе, родник, живой и звонкий...) Novoye Slovo magazine, 1906, No.15.
- "Through pines and fir-trees in the dark front garden..." (Чёрные ели и сосны сквозят в палисаднике тёмном...) Poems (1903–1906), as "On Decline" (На ущербе).
- "Thick green fir-trees by the road..." (Густой зелёный ельник у дороги...) Poems (1903–1906), as "The Deer" (Олень).
- "Istanbul" (Стамбул) Novoye Slovo anthology, Vol.1 1907.
- "Drowns the Sun like a scarlet ember..." (Тонет солнце, рдяным углем тонет...) Zhurnal Dlya Vsekh, the monthly version, 1906, No.5, May, as "Shepherds" (Пастухи).
- "Ra-Osiris, Lord of day and light..." (Ра-Осирис, владыка дня и света...) Znanye, Vol. 16, 1907, as "Egypt" (Египет).
- The Flood (Потоп) Poems (1903–1906). The poem retells the Babylonian myths of The Flood, according to the translations of the cuneiform sources, available at the time. Names of Babylonian gods given in ancient (occasionally corrupted) transcriptions.
- "Elbrus" (Эльбрус). Poems (1903–1906).
- "A Novice" (Послушник). Subtitled "The Georgian Song". Poems (1903–1906).
- "Khaya-bash" (Хая-баш). Poems (1903–1906).
- "Thamjid" (Тэмжид). Znanye, book 7, 1905.
- "The Mystery" (Тайна). Znanye, book 7, 1905. The poem about the 'lost' letters of Arabic alphabet, allegedly hiding great mysteries.
- "With Fishing-spear" (С острогой). Poems (1903–1906).
- "To a Mystic" (Мистику). Russkaya Mysl, 1905, No.7, July.
- "Statue of a Woman Christian Slave" (Статуя рабыни-христианки). Zhurnal Dlya Vssekh (monthly), 1905, No.9, September.
- "Ghosts" (Призраки). Zhurnal Dlya Vsekh, the monthly version, 1905, No.7, July.
- "The Inextinguishable Icon-lamp" (Неугасимая лампада). Zhurnal Dlya Vsekh, the monthly version, 1905, No.7, July.
- "The Top" (Вершина). Znanye, Book 6, 1905, untitled.
- "By Hidden Paths" (Тропами потаёнными) Mir Bozhy, 1905, No.10, October, untitled.
- "In the Open Sea" (В открытом море). Znanye, Book 6, 1905, untitled.
- "As the evening approaches" (Под вечер). Zhurnal Dlya Vsekh, the monthly version, 1905, No.8, August.
- "Through the Branches" (Сквозь ветви). Zhurnal Dlya Vsekh, the monthly version, 1905, #10, October.
- "Cologne" (Кёльн). Zhurnal Dlya Vsekh, the monthly version, 1905, No.9, September.
- "Sudra" (Cудра). Zhurnal Dlya Vsekh, the monthly version, 1905, No.9, September.
- "Fire" (Огонь). Znanye, Book 6, 1905, untitled.
- "Sky" (Небо). Zhurnal Dlya Vsekh, the monthly version, 1905, No.4, April.
- "At the Vines" (На винограднике). Pravda magazine, 1905, No.12, December.
- "Oceanides" (Океаниды). Pravda magazine, 1905, No.8, August.
- "'The Moaning" (Стон). Russkaya Mysl, 1905, No.9, September.
- "In the Mountain Valley" (В горной долине). Zhurnal Dlya Vsekh, the monthly version, 1905, No.10, October.
- "Ohrmazd" (Ормузд). Zhupel magazine, 1905, No.1.
- "The Day of Wrath" (День гнева). Mir Bozhy, 1905, No.8, August, as "Dies irae".
- "Black Stone of Kaaba" (Чёрный камень Каабы). Znanye, Book 7, as "Black Stone".
- "For Treachery" (За измену). Znanye, Book 7, 1905, originally without an epigraph. In later version – with it, from Queran, 2, 244. The poem relates the legend which Bunin had learned of from the commentaries to the Queran translation by Kazimirsky (1864).
- "Safia's Tomb" (Гробница Сафии). Znanye, Book 7, 1905.

1906

- "Lapwings" (Чибисы). Put (The Way) magazine, No.2, 1912.
- "A Bather Girl" (Купальщица). Severnye Zapiski magazine, 1914, No.22, February.
- "New Year" (Новый год). Zhurnal Dlya Vsekh, the monthly version, 1906, No.24, April.
- "From the Window" (Из окна). Poems (1903–1906)
- "Snake" (Змея). Poems (1903–1906)
- "Slave" (Невольник). Zolotoye Runo, 1906, No.25, May.
- "Sorrow" (Печаль). Znanye, book 9, 1906.
- "A Song" (Песня). Znanye, book 9, 1906. The author recorded it to be released as a record in 1910.
- "For Children" (Детская). Znanye, book 9, 1906.
- "Small River" (Речка). Novoye Slovo, 1906, Nos.234-35.
- "Plowman" (Пахарь). Novoye Slovo, 1906, No.19, as "With a Plough" (За сохой).
- "Two Rainbows" (Две радуги). Nash Zhurnal (Our Journal), Moscow, 2011, No.5, March, untitled.
- "Sunset" (Закат). Nash Zhurnal, Moscow, 2011, No.5, March, untitled.
- "Stranger" (Чужая). Zhurnal Dlya Vsekh, the monthly version', 1906, No.4, April.
- "Childhood" (Детство). Zhurnal Dlya Vsekh, the monthly version, 1906, No.7, July.
- "Pomorye" (Поморье). Zhurnal Dlya Vsekh, the monthly version, 1906, No.7, July.
- "Sweet Clover" (Донник). Poems (1903–1906).
- "By the Hovel" (У шалаша). Poems (1903–1906).
- "Terem" (Терем). Poems (1903–1906).
- "Grief" (Горе). Poems (1903–1906).
- "Dunes" (Дюны). Poems (1903–1906).
- "Stone Woman" (Каменная баба). Znanye, book 9, 1906.
- "Aeschylus" (Эсхил). Znanye, book 9, 1906.
- "At the Coast of Asia Minor" (У берегов Малой Азии). Znanye, book 9, 1906, as "At the Northern Coast of Asia Minor"
- "Agni" (Агни). Poems (1903–1906).
- "The Fire Pillar" (Столп огненный). Mir Bozhy, 1906, No.7, July.
- "The Son of Man" (Сын человеческий). Poems (1903–1906).
- "A Dream" (Сон). Poems (1903–1906).
- "Atlas" (Атлант). Znanye, book 9, 1906.
- "The Golden Seine" (Золотой невод). Poems (1903–1906).
- House Warming (Новоселье). Poems (1903–1906).
- Dagestan (Дагестан). Poems (1903–1906).
- "At the Cliff" (На обвале). Sovremenny Mir (Modern World), 1906, No.10, October.
- "Hagia Sophia" (Айа-София). Znanye, book 9, 1906.
- "To the East" (К востоку). Poems (1903–1906).
- "The Guiding Signs" (Путеводные знаки). Literature and Science compilation, published by Mir Bozhy, 1906. Epigraph taken from Queran.
- "To the Wise" (Мудрым). Adskaya Potchta (The Post from Hell) magazine, 1906, No.1.
- "Green Banner" (Зелёный стяг). Fakely (Torches) almanac, book 1, 1906.
- "Sacred Ashes" (Священный прах). Novoye Slovo, 1906, Nos.24-25.
- "Abraham" (Авраам). Poems (1903–1906).
- "Satan to God" (Сатана богу). Poems (1903–1906). Epigraph taken from Queran.
- "Zeynab" (Зейнаб). Poems (1903–1906).
- "White Wings" (Белые крылья). Zhurnal Dlya Vsekh, the monthly version', 1906, No.6, June. Inspired by the tale of Mohammed's servant witnessing two angels shielding his master from the Sun, with wings.
- "A Bird" (Птица). Poems (1903–1906). Epigraph taken from Queran, 17, 14.
- "Beyond the Grave" (За гробом) Russkaya Mysl, 1907, No.3, March, as "Day of Judgement" (День суда).
- "Mohammed in Exile" (Магомет в изгнании). Znanye, book 16, 1907.
- "Huge Old Red Steamer..." (Огромный, красный, старый пароход...) Sovremenny Mir, 1906, No.1, October, as "At the Port" (В порту).
- "I love the coloured window glass…" (Люблю цветные стекла окон...) Znanye, book 15. 1907, as "Coloured Windows" (Цветные стекла)
- "The Moon is still transparent and pale…" (Луна ещё прозрачна и бледна...) Zolotoye Runo, 1906, Nos.7-9, July–September, as At the Dacha (На даче).
- "Screeching and creeking over the flooded bay…" (И скрип и визг над бухтой наводнённой...) Znanye, Vol.14, 1906, as "The Morning" (Утро).
- "I'll wake – and in the gardens..." (Проснусь, проснусь – за окнами, в саду...) Znanye, book 15, 1905.
- "St.Peter's Day" (Петров день). Shipovnik (Wild roses) almanac, book 2, 1907.
- "The fence, the cross, the greenish grave..." (Ограда, крест, зеленая могила...) Pereval magazine, 1906, No.2, as "Requiem" (Панихида).
- "It grows on, graveyard grass..." (Растёт, растёт могильная трава...) Novoye slovo, book 2, 1907, as "Oblivion" (Забвение).
- "The Waltz" (Вальс). Novoye slovo, book 3, 1907, as "A Dream" (Сон).
- "A midnight frigate passed the island..." (Мимо острова в полночь фрегат проходил...) Znanye, book 29, 1910, as "The Ancient Verse" (Старинные стихи).
- "Heimdallr was looking for a saintly spring..." (Геймдаль искал родник божественный...) Shipovnik (Wild Rose) almanac, book 2, 1907. As "Heimdallr".
- "Pop Gun" (Пугач). Zolotoye Runo, 1906, Nos.7-9.
- "Under-tutor" (Дядька). Znanye, book 15, 1915, as Untitled.
- "The Swifts" (Стрижи). Novoye Slovo, book 2, 1907.
- "On the Roads" (На рейде). Pereval (Mountain Pass) magazine, 1906, No.2.
- "Giordano Bruno" (Джордано Бруно). Znanye, book 14, 1906.
- "In Moscow" (В Москве). Novoye Slovo, No.3, 1907.

== 1907–1911 ==
1907

- "Trees in pearly hoar-frost..." (Леса в жемчужном инее. Морозно...) Sovremenny Mir, 1909, No.1, January, as "Hoar-frost" (Иней).
- "Seeing Off" (Проводы). Shipovnik almanac, book 2, 1907.
- "Dia" (Дия). Pereval, 1907, No.4, February.
- "Hermon" (Гермон). Sovremenny Mir, 1909, No.11, November.
- "On the road near Hebron..." (На пути под Хевроном...) Russkaya Mysl, 1907, No.9, September, as "Near Hebron".
- "Rachel's Tomb" (Гробница Рахили). Schit (Sword) anthology. Moscow, 1915.
- "Jerusalem" (Иерусалим). Russkaya Mysl, 1907, No.9, September.
- "Temple of the Sun" (Храм Солнца). Novoye Slovo, book 2, 1907. Bunin was in Baalbek on May 5 and 6, 1907. He wrote the poem in Syria, on his way from Damask, according to Vera Muromtseva's memoirs.
- "Chalma on a sage is like the Moon..." (Чалма на мудром – как луна...) Yuzhnoye Slovo, 1919, No.51, October 12.
- "Resurrection" (Воскреcение). Zarnitsa anthology, Vol.1, 1908, as "Death" (Смерть).
- "A little orphan walked a dusty road..." (Шла сиротка пыльною дорогой...) Znanye, book 21, 1908, as "A Little Orphan".
- "Blind Man" (Слепой). Znanye, book 15, 1907.
- "The New Temple" (Новый храм). Novoye Slovo, book 2. 1907, as "Christ" (Христос). Recited by the author and recorded to be released on a gramophone record in 1910.
- "Colibri" (Колибри). Novoye Slovo, book 3, 1908.
- "In a backyard's nettle lived a cat..." (Кошка в крапиве за домом жила...) Sovremenny Mir, No.9, September, as "A Cat", alongside "The Slump" (Обвал) under the common title "From the 'Death' cycle".
- "Old hag named Death, she sat..." (Присела на могильнике Савуре...) Novoye Slovo, book 2, 1907, as "Flax".
- "The early April dawn is fresh..." (Свежа в апреле ранняя заря...) Severnye Zapiski, 1914, No.1, January.
- "There oriole was singing like a flute..." (Там иволга, как флейта, распевала...) Znanye, book 21, 1908, as "The Grove" (Роща).
- "A Pauper" (Нищий). Zhurnal Dlya Vsekh, the monthly version, 1914, No.1, January.
- "The motley-winged chekankas twitter..." (Щебечут пестрокрытые чеканки...) The Works by I.A.Bunin, Vol. 3, as "At Damascus".
- "In the dark of a century-old black fir-tree..." (В столетнем мраке чёрной ели...) Mitya's Love, 1935.
- "The Khan here is buried, who conquered..." (Тут покоится хан, покоривший несметные страны...) Poslednye Novosti, 1935, No.5334, October 31.
- "Theseus" (Тезей). Novoye Slovo anthology, book 1. Moscow, 1907. The poem is an improvisation on several Greek myths.
- "Wasteland" (Пустошь). Znanye, book 21, 1908.
- "Cain" (Каин). Russkaya Mysl, 1907, No.10, October.
- "Scarecrow" (Пугало). Znanye, book 15, 1907.
- "Heritage" (Наследство). Novoye Slovo (New Word) anthology, book 1. Moscow, 1907
- "A Nurse" (Няня). Novoye Slovo magazine, 1907, No.4, with a dedication to N.Krasheninnikov.
- "At Plyuschika" (На Плющихе). Pereval, 1907, No.4, February.
- "Hopelessness" (Безнадежность). Pereval, 1907, No.10, August, with three other poems (Quagmire, Saturn and Off the Ship) under the common title "From the Death cycle".
- "Quagmire" (Трясина). Pereval, 1907, No.10, August.
- "Odin" (Один). Znanye, book 16, 1907.
- "Saturn" (Сатурн). Pereval, 1907, No.10, August.
- "Off the Ship" (С корабля). Pereval, 1907, No.10, August.
- "Landslide" (Обвал). Sovremenny Mir, 1907, No.9, September, untitled.
- "Along these sultry seaside plains..." (Вдоль этих плоских знойных берегов...) Novoye Slovo anthology, book 1. 1907, as "The Shore" (Берег).
- "Balagula" (Балагула). Russkaya Mysl, 1907, No.8, August.
- "The Law" (Закон). Sovremenny Mir, 1907, No.11, November.
- "Mandragora" (Мандрагора). Sovremenny Mir, 1907, No.11, November.
- "Roses of Shiraz" (Розы Шираза). Znanye, book 16, 1907.
- "With a Monkey" (С обезьяной). Znanye, book 20, 1908, with "The Throne of Solomon" under the common title "Stories in Verse".
- "Mekam" (Мекам). Sovremenny Mir, 1907, No.11, November.
- "The Eternal One" (Бессмертный). Znanye, book 16, 1907.
- "Cairo" (Каир). Novoye slovo anthology, book 2, 1907.
- "Ishtar" (Истара). Znanye, book 16, 1907.
- "Alexander in Egypt" (Александр в Египте). Shipovnik, book 2, 1907.

1908

- "God" (Бог). Sovremenny mir, 1908, No.11, November. 7.VII.08
- "Savaof" (Саваоф). Znanye, book 29, 1910. 28.VII.03.
- "Alcyone" (Гальциона). Odesskye Novosti newspaper, 1910, No.8071, March 21. Based on a myth related by Ovid. "28.VII.08".
- "In Archipelago" (В архипелаге). Znanye, book 24. 1908. 12.VIII.08.
- "God of the Noon" (Бог полдня). Zolotoye Runo, 1908, No.10, October. 12.VIII.08.
- "Mountain Forest" (Горный лес). Znanye, book 24. 1908. "14.VIII.08".
- "Jerico" (Иерихон). Znanye, book 25. 1908. "14.VIII.08".
- "Caravan" (Караван). Znanye, book 24. 1908. "15.VIII.08".
- "The Valley of Jehoshaphat" (Долина Иосафата. Poems and Stories. 1907–1909 (1910). A poem about the Judgement Day's sire, usually associated with Kidron Valley. "20.VIII.08".
- "Bedouin" (Бедуин). Znanye, book 25. 1908. "20.VIII.08".
- "Lucifer" (Люцифер). Burning Lights's publishing house anthology, book 1, Ekaterinoslav, 1910. "20.VIII.08"
- "Imru' al-Qais" (Имру-уль-Кайс). New Word anthology, book 3, 1908, as "Footstep" (След). "21.VIII.08".
- "Windows are open. In white-walled workshop..." (Открыты окна. В белой мастерской...) New Word, book 3, 1908, as "Dacha" (Дача). "28.VIII.08".
- "The Artist" (Художник). Sovremennik magazine, 1913, No.5, May. A poem about Anton Chekhov and his house in Yalta where Bunin often stayed as a guest.
- "Desperation" (Отчаяние). Severnye Zapiski, 1914, No.12, February.
- "Dry corn stakes in the fields..." (На полях сухие стебли кукурузы...) Zarnitsy, Vol.1. 1908, as "Lethargy" (Летаргия).
- "The Throne of Solomon" (Трон Соломона). Znanye, book 20. 1908.
- "Fishing" (Рыбалка). Sovremenny Mir, 1908, No.1, January.
- "Baba Yaga" (Баба Яга). Poems (1907), 1908.
- "A Savage" (Дикарь). Poems (1907), 1908.
- "The Parting Words" (Напутствие). Poems (1907), 1908.
- "Last Tears" (Последние слёзы). Znanye, book 24. 1908.
- "Fisherwoman" (Рыбачка). Znanye, book 24. 1908.
- "Wine" (Вино). Novoye Slovo, book 3, Moscow, 1908.
- "A Widower" (Вдовец). Zarnitsy, Vol. 1, 1908.
- "Christya" (Христя). Zarnitsy, Vol. 1, 1908.
- "The Lace" (Кружево). Znanye, book 21. 1908.

1909

- "The Mist" (Туман). Poems and Stories, 1907–1909, 1910. "25.III.09, Syracuse".
- "In the Wake of Messina earthquake" (После Мессинского землетрясения). Poems and Stories, 1907–1909, 1910, as "In Messina Strait". In 1909 Bunin and Muromtseva traveled through Sicily, stayed in Palermo and visited Messina ruins which left them deeply shaken and moved. "15.IV.09".
- "Small forests sang..." (В мелколесье пело глухо, строго...) Poems and Stories, 1907–1909, 1910, as "The Wizard" (Колдун). "25.V.09".
- "Hayfield" (Сенокос). Znanye, book 27. 1909. "3.VII.09".
- "A Dog" (Собака). Znanye, book 30. 1910. "4.VIII.09".
- A Grave in a Rock (Могила в скале). Znanye, book 30. 1910. "6.VIII.09".
- "Midnight" (Полночь). Utro (Morning) anthology. Vol. 2, 1913, as "Island". "6.VIII.09".
- "Sunrise" (Рассвет). Poems and Stories, 1907–1909, 1910, as "Before Sunrise". "13.VIII.09".
- "Noon" (Полдень). Znanye, book 30. 1910. "14.VIII.09".
- "Evening" (Вечер). Poems and Stories, 1907–1909, 1910. "14.VIII.09".
- "After-tossing" (Мертвая зыбь). Poems and Stories, 1907–1909, 1910. "9.VI.09".
- "Prometeus in a Cave" (Прометей в пещере). Poems and Stories, 1907–1909, 1910. "10.VI.09".
- "Sea Breeze" (Морской ветер). Drukarh anthology, 1910. "8.VIII.09".
- "The Keeper" (Сторож). Drukarh, 1910. "16.VIII.09".
- "The Shore" (Берег). Drukarh, 1910. "16.VIII.09".
- "The Dispute" (Спор). Sovremenny Mir, 1909, December, No.12. "17.VIII.09".
- "Star-worshippers" (Звёздопоклонники). Sovremenny Mir, 1909, No.2, February, untitled.
- "Farewell" (Прощание). Utro Rossii (Russia's Morning) newspaper. 1909. No.67, December 25, untitled.
- "A Song" (Песня). Vershiny (Peaks) anthology, book I, 1909, as "Flax" (Лён).
- "Lightnings" (Сполохи). Utro Rossii, 1909, No.67, December 25, untitled.

1910

- "Cicadas at Night" (Ночные цикады). Znanye, book 30. 1910.
- "Pilgrim" (Пилигрим). Drukarh, 1910, as Haji (Хаджи).
- "Of Pyotr the Outlaw" (О Петре-разбойнике). Russkoye Slovo, 1910, No.299, December 28.
- "The First Time" (В первый раз). Odesskye Novosti, 1910, No.8094, April 18.

1911

- "By the Road" (При дороге). Novaya Zhizn (The New Life) magazine, 1911, No.13, December. "28.I.11, Geluan, Cairo".
- "Ocean under the clear Moon..." (Океан под ясною луною...) Ioann the Mourner, 1913, as "Nightly Clouds" (Ночные облака). "25.II.11, Indian Ocean".
- "The distant flashes, black and blind..." (Мелькают дали, чёрные, слепые...) Ioann the Mourner, 1913, as "Distant Thunder" (Дальняя гроза). "26.II.11".
- "Night-lodging" (Ночлег). Zhurnal Dlya Vsekh, monthly edition, 1914, No.4, April.
- "The Calling" (Зов). Retch (Speech) newspaper, 1912, No.354, December 25. "8.VII.11".
- "Sundial" (Солнечные часы). Potok (The Stream) almanac, Moscow, 1911.
- "The Spring of a Star" (Источник звезды). Poems and Stories, 1907–1909, 1910.
- "To Mother" (Матери). The Works by I.A.Bunin, Vol.3.
- "Nameless" (Без имени). Poems and Stories, 1907–1909, 1910.
- "Lemon Drop" (Лимонное зерно). Poems and Stories, 1907–1910, 1912.
- "Muzhitchok" (Мужичок) Nash Zhurnal (Our Magazine). Moscow, 1911, No.8, May 1.
- "The Butler" (Дворецкий). Poems and Stories, 1907–1910, 1912.
- "Krinitsa" (Криница) Poems and Stories, 1907–1910, 1912.
- "A Song" (Песня). Novaya Zhizn, 1911, No.4, March.
- "A Winter Villa" (Зимняя вилла). Sovremenny Mir, 1911, No.4, April.
- "In the Memory of" (Памяти). Poems and Stories, 1907–1910, 1912.
- "A Little Birch" (Березка). Vseobshyi Yezhemesyachnik (Everyone's Monthly). 1911, No.11, November.

== 1912–1917 ==
1912

- "The Pskovian Woods" (Псковский бор). Severnye Zapiski, 1914, No.2, February. A homage to Alexander Pushkin, according to Bunin's "Thinking of Pushkin" essay. "23.VII.12".
- "Two Voices" (Два голоса). Vestnik Evropy, 1913, No.2, February, as "The Song'"(Песня). Written after the Russian folk song "Dark is the night and crescent-less..." (Ночь темна да не месячна) "23.VII.12".
- "Ancestors" (Пращуры). Retch, 1913, No.1, January. "24.VII.12".
- "The winter night is cold and turbid..." (Ночь зимняя мутна и холодна...) Ioann the Mourner, 1913, as "The Giant Elk" (Великий лось). "25.VII.12"
- "The Nightly Snake" (Ночная змея). Sovremenny Mir, 1913, No.2, February. "28.VII.12".
- "On the Way from Nazareth" (На пути из Назарета). Russkoye Slovo, 1912, No.249, October 28, as "Mother" (Мать). "31.VII.12".
- "In Sicily" (В Сицилии). Novaya Zhyzn, 1912, No.12, December, as "Monasteries" (Монастыри). "1.VIII.12".
- "Summer Night" (Летняя ночь). Vestnik Evropy, 1913, No.1, January. "1.VIII.12".
- "White Deer" (Белый олень). Russkaya Mysl, 1912, No.12, December. After the Russian folk song "My quite Danube..." "1.VIII.12".
- "Alisaphia" (Алисафия). Sovremenny Mir, 1912, No.11, November. Based on a religious poem on Saint George
- "Prophet's Descendants" (Потомки пророка). Sovremennik, 1913, No.4, April.
- The camel hisses, refusing to rise... (Шипит и не встаёт верблюд...) Ioann the Mourner, 1913, as In Skutari.
- "Coals" (Уголь). Sovremennik, 1913, No.4, April.
- "Day of Judgement" (Судный день). Zhivoye Slovo (The Living Word), 1912, No.44, November. "8.VIII.12".
- "November Night" (Ноябрьская ночь). Sovremennik, 1913, No.2, February. "8.VIII.12.
- "The Curtain" (Завеса), Rampa i Zhizn (Rampe and Life), Moscow, 1912, No.44, October 22. "8.VIII.12".
- "Rhythm" (Ритм). Sovremenny Mir, 1913, No.1, January. "9.12.12".
- "The cloud moved like fires' smoke..." (Как дым пожара туча шла...) Vestnik Evropy, 1912, No.12, December as "On the wide road" (На большой дороге). "10.VIII.12".
- "The Tomb" (Гробница). Sovremennik, 1913, No.11, November. "10.VIII.12".
- "Firefly" (Светляк). Zavety (Testamets) magazine, Saint Petersburg, 1912, No.8, November. "24.VIII.12, near Sebezh".
- "Steppe" (Степь). Ioann the Mourner, 1913. "21.VIII.12".

1913

- "Cold Spring" (Холодная весна). Ioann the Mourner, 1913. "2.III.13".
- "Sailor" (Матрос). Prosveschenye (Enlightenment) magazine, Saint Petersburg, 1913, No.4. "8.III.13".
- "Svyatogor" (Святогор). Ioann the Mourner, 1913, as "Svyatogor's Horse". "8.VIII.13, Anacapri".
- "Saadi's Behest" (Завет Саади). Zarevo almanac, book 1, 1915. Persian poet Saadi was one of Bunin's all-time favourites, he often quoted him in letters and while signing books used quotations from him.
- "Old Man" (Дедушка). Ioann the Mourner, 1913. "19.VIII.13"
- "Stepmother" (Мачеха). Ioann the Mourner, 1913. "20.VIII.13".
- "Poison" (Отрава). Ioann the Mourner, 1913, as Daughter-in-law (Невестка). 20.VIII.13.
- "Musket" (Мушкет). Russkoye Slovo, 1913, No.212, September 13.
- "Venice" (Венеция). Sovremenny Mir, 1913, No.12, December, as In Venice with a dedication to A.A.Korzinkin. "30.VIII.13".
- "Warm night, on a mountain footpath..." (Тёплой ночью, горною тропинкой...) Russkoye Slovo, 1913, No.212, September 13, as "On the Stones" (На камнях). 4.IX.13.
- "Tombstone" (Могильная плита). Ioann the Mourner, 1913. Epigraph (Again familiar house..., Опять знакомый дом) from the poem by Nikolai Ogaryov. "6.IX.13".
- "After Dinner" (После обеда). Ioann the Mourner, 1913. "6.IX.13".

1914

- "The Grieving Lord" (Господь скорбящий). Russkoye Slovo, 1914, No.80, April 6. "10.III.14, Capri".
- "James" (Иаков). Russkoye Slovo, 1914, No.80, April 6. "10.III.14".
- "Mohammed and Saphia" (Магомет и Сафия). Sovremenny Mir, 1914, No.12, December. "24.III.14".
- "A widow cried at night..." (Плакала ночью вдова...) Russkoye Slovo, 1914, No.80, April 6, as "Nightly Cry" (Плач ночью).
- "Tora" (Тора). Otechestvo magazine, 1915, Nos.5-6. "24.III.14, Rome".
- "The New Testament" (Новый завет). Russkoye Slovo, 1914, No.80, April 6. "24.III.14, Rome".

1915

- "A Signet Ring" (Перстень). Tvorchestvo (Creativity) almanac., book 2, 1918. "7.I.15, Moscow".
- "The Word" (Слово). Letopis (Chronicles) magazine, 1915, No.1, December. "7.I.15, Moscow".
- "Awakening in twilight..." (Просыпаюсь в полумраке...) Rul, Berlin, 1920, No.34, December 25. "17.I.15, Petersburg".
- "St. Eustace" (Святой Евстафий). Rose of Jerico, 1924. "27.VIII.15, Vasilyevskoye".
- "To the Poet" (Поэту). Letopis (Chronicles) magazine, 1915, No.1, December. "27.III.15, Vasilyevskoye".
- "Oh Night, ascend your heavenly throne..." (Взойди, о Ночь, на горний свой престол...) Russkoye Slovo, 1915, No.296, December 25, as "To the Night" (К ночи). "31.VIII.15, Vasilyevskoye".
- "The Bride" (Невеста). Monthly Journal, 1916, No.1, January. "2.IX.15".
- "The pallid pinkish dew..." (Роса, при бледно-розовом огне...) Otchizna anthology, Simferolol, book 1, 1919.
- "Ceylon" (Цейлон). Vestnik Evropy, 1915, No.12, December, as "Algalla Mountain". "10.IX.15".
- "Colour of White" (Белый цвет). Russkoye Slovo, 1915, No.296, December 25. "10.IX.15".
- "Solitude" (Одиночество). Sovremenny Mir, 1916, No.9, September, as "Bonna". "10.IX.15".
- "Gets noisier and muddier the sea..." (К вечеру море шумней и мутней...) Sovremenny Mir, 1916, No.9, September, as "The Dacha in the North" (Дача на севере). "11.IX.15".
- "War" (Война). Birzhevye Vedomosti, 1915, No.15290, December 25, as "The Leper" (Прокажённый). "12.IX.15".
- "Drought in Paradise" (Засуха в раю). Letopis, 1916, No.1, January. "12.IX.15".
- "By Nubian black huts..." (У нубийских черных хижин). Severnye Zapiski, 1915, Nos.11-12, as Beyond Aswan (За Ассуаном). "12.IX.15".
- "In hot golden sunset of Pyramid..." (В жарком золоте заката Пирамиды...) Sovremenny Mir, 1916, No.9, September, as "On the Hotel Roof by a Pyramid" (На крыше отеля у Пирамид). "13.IX.15".
- "Why you are dim, a lightly crescent?.." (Что ты мутный, светел-месяц?..) Severnye Zapiski, 1915, Nos.11-12. "13.IX.15, Vasilyevskoye".
- "The Execution" (Казнь). Sovremenny Mir, 1916, No.10, October. "13.IX.15".
- "The Six-winged" (Шестикрылый). Letopis, 1915, No.1, December. Of the several Bunin's poems published by Letopis Ivan Shmelyov wrote rapturously in a letter dated March 1, 1915. "In 'The Six-winged' there is the whole of Russian history, the whole picture of Russian life... I know by heart, all of them. There are masterpieces, my friend. You know it, but I want you to know I see it too." "14.IX.15".
- "The Sail" (Парус). Vestnik Evropy, 1915, No.12, December. "14.IX.15".
- "Exodus" (Бегство в Египет). Letopis, 1916, No.9, September. "21.X.15".
- "The Tale of a Nanny-goat" (Сказка о козе). Zhar-ptitsa magazine, Berlin, No.2. "29.X.15, Vasilyevskoye".
- "Svyatitel" (Святитель) Letopis, 1916, No.2, February. "29.X.15".
- "First Snow" (Зазимок). Otzvuki Zhizni (Echoes of Life) almanac, III, 1916. "29.X.15".
- "The desert in a dim hot light..." (Пустыня в тусклом, жарком свете...) Otchizna anthology, Book 1, Simferopol, 1919. "30.X.15".
- "Alyonushka" (Алёнушка). Letopis, 1916, No.1, January. "30.X.15".
- "Irisa" (Ириса). Novaya Zhizn, 1915, December, as "Grandfather's Poems" (Дедушкины стихи). "30.X.15".
- "Skomorokhi" (Скоморохи). Letopis, 1916, No.1, January. "30.X.15".

1916

- "The Malay Song" (Малайская песня). Severnye Zapiski, 1916, No.2, February. Epigraph by Leconte de Lisle. "23.I.16".
- "Svyatogor and Ilya" (Святогор и Илья). Letopis, 1916, No.4, April. "23.I.16".
- "St.Prokopy" (Святой Прокопий). Letopis, 1916, No.3, March. The poem, depicting (according to the author) "the cruellest, typically Russian episode in Saint Prokopy's life", has been included into The Life of Arseniev novel, then got removed. "23.I.16".
- "Bishop Ignatius Rostotsky's Dream" (Сон епископа Игнатия Ростоцкого). Sovremenny Mir, 1916, No.10, October, as The Bishop's Dream (Сон епископа). Also, in Monthly Journal, 1916, Nos.9-10. 23.I.16.
- "Mathew the Seer" (Матфей Прозорливый). Sovremenny Mir, 1916, No.11, November. "24.I.16".
- "Prince Vseslav" (Князь Всеслав). Letopis, II, 1916, No.3, March. "24.I.16".
- "Me, the young one, got bored in the terem..." (Мне вечор, младой, скучен терем был...) Letopis, 1916, No.4, April, as "The Song" (Песня). "24.I.16".
- "You lightly night, you full-moon heights!.." (Ты, светлая ночь, полнолунная высь!..) Russkaya Gazeta, Paris, 1924, No.51, June 22. "24.I.16".
- "Torn Apart by God" (Богом разлучённые). Severnye Zapiski, 1916, No.10, October, as "The Monk" (Чернец). "25.I.16".
- "Incensory" (Кадильница). For Russian Prisoners of War anthology. 25.I.16.
- "Once, under heavy barque..." (Когда-то, над тяжелой баркой...) Gentleman from San Francisco, as "It's Time" (Пора). "25.I.16".
- "Thorn-apple" (Дурман). Letopis, 1916, No.8, August. Vera Muromtseva-Bunina remembered that the poem was semi-autobiographical: Ivan and Manya, his little sister, spent lots of times in the field with shepherds who were experimenting with herbs. Once a shepherd boy gave them some henbane and only the children's nanny's quick reaction, saved them: she's given them a lot of milk to drink." "30.I.16".
- "The Dream" (Сон). Letopis, 1916, No.8, August. "30.I.16".
- "Circe" (Цирцея). Gentleman from San Francisco, 1916. "31.I.16".
- "Clouds desceend upon Alps..." (На Альпы к сумеркам нисходят облака...) Otchizna anthology, book 1, Simferopol, 1919. "31.I.16".
- "At Virgil's Tomb" (У гробницы Виргилия). Letopis, 1916, No.5, May. "31.I.16".
- "Blue wallpaper faded..." (Синие обои полиняли...) Severnye Zapiski, 1916, No.10, October, as "In the Empty House" (В пустом доме). "31.I.16".
- "On a distant seabord..." (На помории далёком...) Tvorchestvo almanac, book 2, 1918, as "Pesnya" (A Song). "1.II.16".
- "There is no sunlight, and no night..." (Там не светит солнце, не бывает ночи...) Published in a one-off newspaper Trud vnovh dast tebe zhizn y schastje (Labour will give you life and happiness again), 1916, May 10. "1.II.16".
- "Sand separates liman from sea..." (Лиман песком от моря отделен...) The Sprintime Poetry Saloon anthology, 1918, as "The Distant" (Даль). "6.II.16".
- "Mirror" (Зеркало). Letopis, 1916, No.8, August. "10.II.16".
- "Mules" (Мулы). Letopis, 1916, No.7, July. "10.II.16".
- "Sirocco" (Сирокко). Sovremenny Mir, 1916, No.10, October. "10.II.16".
- "Psalter" (Псалтирь). Letopis, 1916, #6, June. On the authograph of the poem Bunin inscribed: "On the news of Sasha Rezvaya's death". The latter was a daughter of their neighbours in Ozerky. "10.II.16".
- "Mignon" (Миньона). Vlast Naroda (People's Power) newspaper, Moscow, 1917, No.195, December 25. "12.II.16".
- "In the Mountains" (В горах). Severnye Zapiski, 1916, as "In The Apennines". "12.II.16".
- "Lyudmila" (Людмила). Vestnik Evropy, 1916, No.3, March. "13.II.16".
- "The mountain wall up to the skies..." (Стена горы – до небосвода...) Otchizna anthology, book 1, Simferopol, 1919. "13.II.16".
- "Indian Ocean" (Индийский океан). Kievskaya Mysl newspaper, 1916, No.358, December 25. "13.II.16".
- "Coliseum" (Колизей). Sovremenny Mir, 1916, No.10, October. "13.II.16".
- "Stop, the Sun!" (Стой, солнце!) Tvorchestvo, book 2, 1918. "13.II.16".
- "Midnight Sun, purple shadows..." (Солнце полночное, тени лиловые...) Sovremenny Mir, 1916, #10, October, as "Beyond Solovki" (За Соловками). With epigraph: "Son of midnight, shades of purple... Sluchevsky." "7.IV.16".
- Youth (Молодость). Sovremenny Mir, 1916, No.10, December. "7.IV.16".
- "The County Sketch" (Уездное). Sovremennye zapiski, 1916, No.10, October, as "Kolotushka" (The beater, Колотушка). "20.VI.16".
- "In the Horde" (В Орде). Letopis, 1916, No.10, October. "27.VI.16".
- "Сeylon" (Цейлон) Zveno, Paris, 1923, No.47, December 24. "27.VI.16".
- "Ebbing Off" (Отлив) Vestnik Evropy, 1916, October 10. "28.VI.16".
- "Goddess" (Богиня). Vestnik Evropy, 1916, October 10. "28.VI.16".
- "In the Circus" (В цирке). Priazovsky Kray newspaper, Rostov on Don, 1916, No.340, December 25. "28.VI.16".
- "Companion" (Спутница) Zveno, Paris, 1923, No.29, August 20. "28.VI.16".
- "Sanctuary" (Святилище). Vestnik Evropy, 1916, No.10, October, as "Sleeping Buddha" (Будда почивающий). "29.VI.16".
- "Fez" (Феска) Yuzhnoye Slovo, 1920, No.9, January 12. "30.VI.16".
- "The Evening Beetle" (Вечерний жук). The Monthly Journal, 1916, Nos.9-10, September–October. "30.VI.16".
- "With reddened needles..." (Рыжими иголками...) Gentleman From San Francisco, 1916, as A Little Song (Песенка). 30.VI.16.
- "The Death of a Saint" (Кончина святителя) Monthly Journal, 1916, Nos.9-10, as "The End". "3.VII.16".
- "Ruslan" (Руслан) Monthly Journal, 1916, Nos.9-10, September–October. "16.VII.16".
- "A Land Without History" (Край без истории... Все лес да лес, болота...) Monthly Journal, 1916, 9-10, as "Without History". "16.VII.16".
- "Rafts" (Плоты). Odessky Listok, 1919, October 27. "16.VII.16".
- "He saw jet-blackness of her hair..." (Он видел смоль ее волос...) Yuzhnoye Slovo, 1919, October 13. "22.VII.16".
- "The midnight ringing of deserted steppe..." (Полночный звон степеной пустыни...) Otchizna, book 1, 1919. "22.VII.16".
- "Grandfather in his Prime" (Дедушка в молодости). Severnye Zapiski magazine, 1916, No.10, October. "22.VII.16".
- "Gamblers" (Игроки). The Gentleman from San Francisco. 1916. "22.VII.16"
- "The Horse of Pallas Athena" (Конь Афины Паллады). The Gentleman from San Francisco. 1916. "22.VII.16".
- "Arch strategist of Middle Ages" (Архистратиг средневековый) Gentleman from San Franciscio, 1916, as "Fresco" (Фреска). "23.VII.16".
- "The Eve" (Канун). Russkaya Mysl, Prague-Berlin, 1923, books 6-8, untitled. "23.VII.16".
- "The Last Bumble-bee" (Последний шмель), Sovremenny Mir, 1916, No.10, October. "26.VII.16".
- "In the hole, squeezed up by houses..." (В норе, домами сдавленной...) Odesskye Novosti, 1919, No.10884, January 7. "6.VIII.16".
- "Again this whitish town..." (Вот он снова, этот белый...) Rose of Jerico, 1924. "9.VIII.16".
- "Isaak Annuniciation" (Благовестие о рождении Исаака) Kievskaya mysl, 1916, No.358, December 25, as "Благовестие". 10.VIII.16.
- "The day will come, I'll disappear..." (Настанет день, исчезну я...) Severnye Zapiski, 1916, #10, October, as '"Without Me" (Без меня).
- "In the Memory of a Friend" (Памяти друга). Gentleman from San Francisco. 1916. Written on the death of a friend, painter V.P.Kurovskoy (1869–1915). "12.VIII.16".
- "On the Nevsky" (На Невском). Sovremenny Mir. 1916, No.10, October. "27.VIII.16".
- "On Quiet Night the Late Crescent came out..." (Тихой ночью поздний месяц вышел...) Tvorchestvo, book 2, 1919, as "Silly Grief" (Глупое горе). "27.VIII.16".
- "Pompeii" (Помпея). Severnye Zapiski, 1916 No.10, October. "28.VIII.16".
- "Calabria Shepherd" (Калабрийский пастух). Severnye Zapiski, 1916, #10, October. "28.VIII.16".
- "Compass" (Компас), Severnye Zapiski, 1916, No.10, October. "28.VIII.16".
- "The sea brewed up with little rolls..." (Покрывало море свитками...) Sovremenny Mir, 1916, #9, September, as "Near Biarriz, in winter". "29.VIII.16".
- "Arcadia" (Аркадия), Severnye Zapiski, 1916, No.10, October. "29.VIII.16".
- "Capri" (Капри), Severnye Zapiski, No.10, October, as "Flowers" (Цветы). "30.VIII.16".
- "We drive along smallwoods, black forests..." (Едем бором, черными лесами...) Severnye Zapiski, 1916, #10, October. "9.IX.16".
- "First Nightingale" (Первый соловей). Yuznoye Slovo, 1919, September 14. "2.X.16".
- "Amidst the Stars" (Среди звёзд). Severnye Zapiski, 1916, No.10, October. "25.X.16".
- "There is a kind of sea, that's milky-white..." (Бывает море белое, молочное...) Mitya's Love, 1925. "28.X.16"
- "The Falling Star" (Падучая звезда). Mitya's Love, 1925, untitled. "30.X.16".
- "The sea, the steppe and Southern August..." (Море, степь и южный август...) Mitya's Love, 1925. "30.X.16".
- "The Poetess" (Поэтесса). Zhiznh, Odessa, 1918, No.7, July. "3.I.16".
- "The Spell" (Заклинание). Sovremenny Mir, 1916, No.2, February. "26.I.16".
- "Young King" (Молодой король). Letopis, 1916, No.2, February.
- "Mare" (Кобылица). Vozrozhdenye, 1925, No.151, October 31.
- "Near the End" (На исходе). Gentleman from San Francisco, 1916.
- "Divination" (Гаданье). Russkaya Gazeta, Paris, 1924, No.199, December 14.
- "Hellas" (Эллада). Letopis, 1916, No.7, July.
- "Slave Woman" (Рабыня). Yuznoye Slovo, 1919, No.51, October 20.
- "The Old Apple-tree" (Старая яблоня). Mitya's Love, 1925.
- "Grotto" (Грот). Ruskaya Gazeta, 1924, No.75, July 22.
- "A Dove" (Голубь). Russkaya Gazeta, 1924, No.75, July 22.
- "The Snake" (Змея). Spolokhi magazine, Berlin, 1922, No.5. Subtitled "From the Rus Cycle".
- "Here's familiar grave by the coloured Mediterranean wave..." (Вот знакомый погост у цветной средиземной волны...) Obshchee Delo newspaper, Paris, 1921, No.203, February 3. Subtitled "The Italian lines" (Итальянские строки).
- "The view upon the bay from tavern garden..." (Вид на залив из садика таверны...) Otchizna, book 1, 1919.
- "Snow-dropping clouds are passing by..." (Роняя снег, проходят тучи...) Otchizna, book 1, 1919.
- "By the gates of Sion, over Kidron..." (У ворот Сиона, над Кедроном...) Nash Vek (Our Age) newspaper. Petersburg, 1918, No.89, May 4, 1918.

1917

- "The Year of 1917" (Семнадцатый год). Yuzhnoye Slovo, 1919, No.98. December 13, as "Fires". "27.VI.17"
- "Reproaches" (Укоры). Ogonki magazine, Odessa, 1919, No.34, January 4."11.VIII.17".
- "The Snake" (Змея). Spolokhi, Berlin, 1922, No.5. Subtitled "From the Rus Cycle". "25.VIII.17".
- "Here's familiar grave by the coloured Mediterranean wave..." (Вот знакомый погост у цветной средиземной волны...) Obshchee Delo, 1921, No.203, February 3. Subtitled "Italian lines". "19.VIII.17".
- "How many stars are there upon the dim-lit skies..." (Как много звезд на тусклой синеве!...) Epokha, book 1, Moscow, 1918, as "August". "29.VIII.17"
- "The view upon the bay from tavern garden..." (Вид на залив из садика таверны...) Otchizna, book 1, 1919. "10.IX.17".
- "Casting light, the clouds pass..." (Роняя свет, проходят тучи...). Otchizna, book I, 1919. "12.IX.17".
- * "The Moon" (Луна). Epokha anthology. Book 1, Moscow, untitled. "15.IX.17".
- "By the gates of Zion..." (У ворот Сиона...). Nash Vek (Our Age). newspaper, 1918, No.89, May 4. Rose of Jerico. "16.IX.17".
- "Epitaph" (Эпитафия). Yuznoye Slovo, 1919, No.33, September 29. In the Works by I.A.Bunin, with a hand-written inscription: "Remembering the graveyard in Scutari".
- "The Memory" (Воспоминание). Yuzhnoye Slovo, 1919, No.39, October 6, untitled.
- "Waves" (Волны). Yuzhnoye Slovo, 1919, No.51, October 20.
- "Lily of the Valley" (Ландыш). Yuzhnoye Slovo, 1919, No.19, September 14.
- "Eternal Light" (Свет незакатный). Epokha, book 1, Moscow, 1918, as "The Grave".
- "Oh, the joy of colours!.." (О, радость красок!..) Spolokhi, Berlin, 1922. No.5, as "Falling Leaves" (Листопад). "24.IX.17".
- "Clouds rose up and turned into smoke..." (Стали выше, стали дымом...) Otchizna, 1919. "27.IX.17".
- "Early, barely visible sunrise..." (Ранний, чуть видный рассвет...) Yuzhnoye Slovo, 1919, No.19, September 14, as "Sunrise". "27.IX.17".
- "We walked side by side..." (Мы рядом шли...) Yuzhnoye Slovo, No.19, September 14. "28.IX.17".
- "White clouds curl..." (Белые круглятся облака...) Obshcheye Delo, 1921, No.203, February 3. "29.IX.17".
- "We sat by the oven in the ante-room..." (Мы сели у печки в прихожей...) Rul, 1920, No.34, December 25. "30.IX.17".
- "The Whirlwind rushed..." (Сорвался вихрь, промчал из края в край...) Otchizna, 1919. "1.X.17".
- "The autumn day: steppe, girder and a trough..." (Осенний день. Степь, балка и корыто...) Otchizna, 1919. "1.X.17".
- "Goldfinches’ trills, glassy and dead..." (Щеглы, их звон, стеклянный, неживой...) Sovremennye zapiski, 1924, book 21, as "October 3, 1917". 3.X.17.
- "Eternal changes of this brief life..." (Этой краткой жизни вечным измененьем...) Obshcheye Delo, 1920, No.100, October 23. "10.X.17".
- "Like in April, in alleys at night..." (Как в апреле по ночам в аллее...) Obshcheye Delo, 1920, No.100, October 23. "10.X.17".
- "Wobbles the star amidst the Universe..." (Звезда дрожит среди Вселенной...) Otchzna, 1919. Noted: "The last day in Vasilyevskoye". "22.X.17".
- "Rise of the Moon" (Восход Луны). Rul, 1924, No.1084, June 28. Mitya's Love.
- "In the empty, wall-less chamber of the garden..." (В пустом, сквозном чертоге сада...). Mitya's Love.

== 1918–1953 ==
- "At night in a dacha chair on a balcony..." (В дачном кресле, ночью, на балконе...) Rodnaya Zemlya magazine, Kiev, 1918, No.1, September–October.
- "Flowers and bumble-bees, grass and wheat-ears..." (И цветы, и шмели, и трава, и колосья...) Rodnaya Zemlya, 1918, No.1, September–October.
- "The ancient castle, facing the Moon..." (Древняя обитель супротив луны...) Otchizna, book 1, 1919. Was part of the Road Book (Путевая книга) cycle. In the summer of 1918 Bunins left Moscow for Odessa. A. Derman, Simferopolskye vedomosty newspaper's editor asked him to contribute something to the Otchizna book. "Alas, I've got nothing except for two or three verses. Much as I'd liked to meet your request, I just cannot. I do not recognize myself: so depressed and physically week I was all summer... One thing I'd say for certain: now I'm going to force myself into working again and then, who knows, may be in a couple of weeks' time I'll send you something", Bunin wrote in letter dated October 3, 1918. "I sent you the whole bunch of poems... which comprise this new Road Book of mine", Bunin wrote Derman on October 27. This collection, Road Book featured 15 poems, all of the eight-liners.
- "Dacha is quiet, the night is dark..." (На даче тихо, ночь темна...) Vozrozhdenye newspaper, Moscow, 1918, No.12, June 16. Part of the Road Book cycle.
- "The fire, swung by a wave..." (Огонь, качаемый волной...) Obshchee Delo, 1920, No.143, December 5. With two more verses ("At night in a dacha chair..." and "Flowers and bumble-bees...") under the common title "The Summer Poems". Later included in the Rose of Jerico (1924) compilation.
- "Mikhail" (Михаил). Ogni newspaper, Prague, 1921, No.9, October 3.
- "Paradise Lost" (Потерянный рай). Obschee Delo, 1920, No.157, December 19. Along with another poem, "Reproaches" (Укоры), under the common title "Rus" (Русь).
- "Russian Fairytale" (Русская сказка). Rose of Jerico, 1924. As "On the Isle of Buyan" (На острове Буяне). A variation of the traditional Russian folklore tale.
- "Canary" (Канарейка). Obschee Delo, 1921, No.304, May 16 (along with two other poems), as "Notes" (Заметки).
- "A bird has a nest, a beast has a hole..." (У птицы есть гнездо, у зверя есть нора...) Rose of Jerico, 1924.
- "Rainbow'"(Радуга). Rose of Jerico, 1924.
- "Morpheus" (Морфей). Sovremennye zapiski, Paris, 1924, book XX, untitled. Along with 4 more poems.
- "Sirius" (Сириус). Okno (Window) almanac. Book I, Paris, 1923. In the original the second verse was different: "Where is youth, simple and clean/In the circle, so close and loved/ Where's the old house and resinous fir-tree/Among snow-drifts under the window?" (Где молодость, простая, чистая / В кругу любимом и родном,/ И ветхий дом, и ель смолистая/ Среди сугробов под окном?)
- "Why does the old grave allure me..." (Зачем пленяет старая могила...) Sovremennye zapiski, 1924, book XX.
- "In the midnight hour I'll rise and look..." (В полночный час я встану и взгляну...) Window, book 1, Paris, 1923, as "In The Midnight Hour".
- "Dreams of my springtime love..." (Мечты любви моей весенней...) Sovremennye zapiski, 1924, book XX.
- "It still appears in dreams, al in long grass..." (Всё снится мне, заросшая травой...) Russkaya Mysl, Prague-Berlin, 1923, books VI-VIII.
- "These melancholy lashes, shining black..." (Печаль ресниц, сияющих и черных...) Sovremennye zapiski, Paris, 1924, book XX.
- "Doors to Jerusalem" (Вход в Иерусалим). Window, book I, Paris, 1923.
- "In heliotrope light of fleeting thunderbolts..." (В гелиотроповом свете молний летучих...) Mitya's Love, 1925.
- "Pantera" (Пантера). Zveno newspaper, Paris, 1924, No.70, July 14.
- "1885" (1885 год). Window, book III, Paris, 1923.
- "A Rooster on a Church Cross" (Петух на церковном кресте). Medny Vsadnik (The Copper Horseman) almanac, book I, Berlin, 1922.
- "Encounter" (Встреча). Sovremennye zapiski, book XXI.
- "It rains on end, the trees in fog..." (Льёт без конца, в лесу туман...) Illustrirovannaya Rossiya magazine, Paris, 1924, No.#3, alongside "The sea, the steppe and hot August...", both under the title "Distant Things" (Далёкое).
- "At the Sea" (Уж как на море, на море...) Mitya's Love, 1925, as "The Sea Beauty".
- "Daughter" (Дочь). Sovremennye zapiski, 1924, book XXI.
- "Again these cold grey skies..." (Опять холодные седые небеса...) Mitya's Love, 1925.
- "Only the cold nightly sky..." (Одно лишь небо, светлое, ночное...) Sovremennye zapiski, book XXI, 1924, as "Old Times Poems".
- "Ancient Image" (Древний образ). Vozrozhdenye, 1925, No.5, July 7.
- "Nightly Promenade" (Ночная прогулка). Russkye Novosti, 1946, No.84, December 20.
- "Nel mezzo del camin di nostra vita..." (Земную жизнь пройдя до половины...) Russkye Novosti, 1947, No.100, May 2, untitled.
- "The Night" (Ночь). Judea in Spring, 1952.
- "Temptation" (Искушение). Judea in Spring, 1052.

== Miscellaneous ==
Poems that have not been included in any of the Complete I.A. Bunin editions.

- "You wander, you love and you are happy..." (Ты странствуешь, ты любишь, ты счастлива...) Yuzhnoye Slovo, 1919, No.39, October 6.
- "High white hall with black piano..." (Высокий белый зал, где черная рояль...) Yuzhnoye Slovo, 1919, No.39, October 6.
- "Steppe" (Степь). Yuzhnoye Slovo, 1919, No.98, December 13, along with 4 other poems under the common title "From the Rus" cycle.
- "Small Icon"(Иконка). Yuzhnoye Slovo, 1919, No.98, December 13.
- "Give me, babka, charming drink" (Дай мне, бабка, зелий приворотных...) Rul, 1920. No.29, December 19, along with two other poems under one title "Songs".
- "Gazella" (Газелла). Vozrozhdenye, 1925, No.151, October 31.
- "Cinematograph" (Кинематограф). Illyustrirovannaya Rossia, Paris, 1925.
- "Margarita creeped into her room..." (Маргарита прокралась в светёлку...) Zveno, 1925. Based on Goethe's Faust.
- "Only stones, sands and naked hills..." (Только камни, песни да нагие холмы...) Zveno, 1926, No.194.
- "The Parting" (Разлука) Vozrozhdenye, 1927, No.786, 28 July
- "Light" (Свет) Rossiya, Paris, 1927, No.6, 1 October
- "Where are you, the extinguished star?.." (Где ты, угасшее светило?..) Nedelya, Moscow, 1960, No.10, 7 May
