= Obrazovanye =

Former Russian periodical

- Categories: Literary and education magazine
- Frequency: Weekly
- Founded: 1892
- Final issue: 1909
- Based in: Saint Petersburg, Russian Empire
- Language: Russian

Obrazovanye (Russian: Образование, Education) was a Russian literary and educational magazine, published in Saint Petersburg in 1892–1909, a continuation of an earlier publication called Zhenskoye obrazovanye (Women's Education, 1876–1891). It was edited originally by Vasily Sipovsky, who in 1896 was succeeded by Alexander Ostrogorsky.

In 1902 the literary section appeared in the magazine. Among the authors published by Obrazovaniye were Vikenty Veresayev, Aleksey Chapygin, Evgeny Chirikov, Semyon Yushkevich, Sergei Sergeyev-Tsensky, Mikhail Artsybashev, Anastasiya Verbitskaya and later Alexander Blok, Konstantin Balmont, Ivan Rukavishnikov, Dmitry Merezhkovsky, Zinaida Gippius.

In the early 1900s the journal, part of the Russian leftist press, published the works by such Bolshevik authors as Vladimir Frische, Anatoly Lunacharsky, Mikhail Olminsky, Vatslav Vorovsky (using the pseudonym P. Orlovsky) and Vladimir Lenin (fragments of "The Agrarian Questions and the Critics of Marx" appeared in the 1906, No.2 issue of Obrazovanye).

After the 1905 Revolution the magazine drifted to the center right, turned against both Lenin and Gorky, and the Bolshevik fraction advised its members to sever all ties with it.
