= Maxim Gorky bibliography =

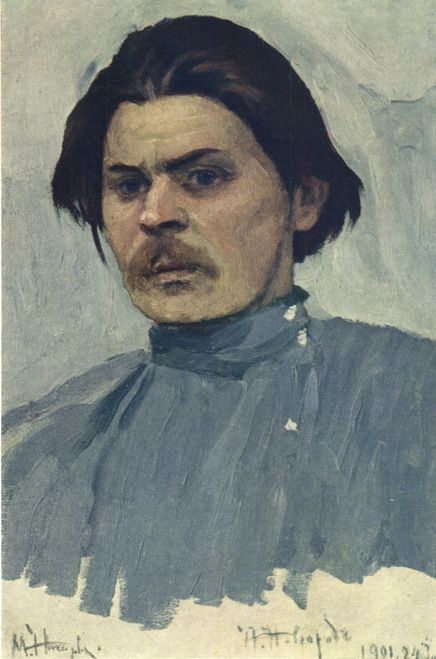
Portrait of Maxim Gorky by Mikhail Nesterov, 1901

This is a bibliography of the works of Maxim Gorky.

== Novels ==
- Orphan Paul (Luckless Pavel; Горемыка Павел, 1894)
- Foma Gordeyev (Фома Гордеев, 1899, also translated as Foma Gordyeeff and The Man Who Was Afraid)
- Three of Them (Трое, 190, also translated as The Three and Three Men)
- Mother (Мать, 1906)
- The Life of a Useless Man (Жизнь ненужного человека, 1908, also translated as The Spy: A Story of a Superfluous Man)
- A Confession (Исповедь, 1908)
- Городок Окуров, 1908
- The Life of Matvei Kozhemyakin (Жизнь Матвея Кожемякина, 1910)
- The Artamonov Business (Дело Артамоновых, 1925)
- The Life of Klim Samgin (Жизнь Клима Самгина, 1927-1936). Published in English as Forty Years: The Life of Clim Samghin
  - Bystander (1930, Part 1)
  - The Magnet (1931, Part 2)
  - Other Fires (1931, Part 3)
  - The Specter (1938, Part 4)

== Novellas ==
- Konovalov (Коновалов, 1897)
- The Orlovs (Супруги Орловы, 1897)
- Creatures That Once Were Men (Бывшие люди, 1897)
- Varenka Olesova (Варенька Олесова, 1898)
- Лето, 1909

== Short stories ==
- "Makar Chudra" (Макар Чудра, 1892)
- "Emelyan Pilyai" (Емельян Пилай, 1893)
- "The Siskin That Lied and the Woodpecker That Loved the Truth" (О чиже, который лгал и о дятле – любителе истины, 1893)
- "Old Arkhip and Lyonka" (Дед Архип и Лёнька, 1893)
- "My Fellow Traveller" (Мой спутник, 1894)
- "About a Little Boy and a Little Girl Who did not Freeze to Death. A Christmas Story (О мальчике и девочке, которые не замёрзли. Святочный рассказ, 1894)
- "The Song of the Falcon" (Песня о Соколе, 1894)
- "One Autumn Night" (Однажды осенью, 1895)
- "A Mistake" (Ошибка, 1895)
- "Conclusion" (Вывод, 1895)
- "Old Izergil" (Старуха Изергиль, 1895)
- "Chelkash" (Челкаш, 1895)
- "The Affair of the Clasps" (Дело с застёжками, 1896)
- "On a Raft" (На плотах, 1896)
- "The Khan and His Son" (Хан и его сын, 1896)
- "Malva" (Мальва, 1897)
- "Boles" (Болесь, 1897, translated also as "Her Lover")
- "Comrades" (Товарищи, 1897)
- "In the Steppe" (В степи, 1897)
- "The Green Kitten" (1897)
- "Mischief-Maker" (Проходимец, 1897)
- "Goltva Fair" (Ярмарка в Голтве, 1897)
- "Mischievous Lad" (Озорник, 1897)
- "Boredom" (Скуки ради, 1897)
- "Heartache" (1897)
- "An Adulterous Wife" (1897)
- "An Insolent Man" (1897)
- "Chums" (Дружки, 1898)
- "A Rolling Stone" (1898)
- "Cain and Artyom" (Каин и Артём, 1898)
- "A Reader" (1898)
- "Twenty-six Men and a Girl" (Двадцать шесть и одна, 1899)
- "Waiting for the Ferry" (1899)
- "Red" (1899)
- "Concerning the Devil" (1899)
- "The Hungry Ones" (1899)
- "Commonplace People" (1903)
- "Soldiers" (1905)
- "Prison" (Тюрьма, 1905)
- "Three Days" (1905)
- "Bukoyomov" (Букоёмов, Карл Иванович, 1905)
- "The Story of Filipp Vasilyevich" (Рассказ Филиппа Васильевича, 1905)
- "The Kingdom of Tedium" (1906)
- "Mob" (1906)
- "An Incident From the Life of Makar" (1912)
- "In Old Russia" (1913)
- "The Master" (1913)
- "First Love" (1923)
- "The Birth of a Man" (1923)
- "In a Mountain Defile" (1923)
- "Kalinin" (1923)
- "The Deadman" (1923)
- "Hodgepodge" (1923)
- "An Evening at Shamov's" (1923)
- "An Evening at Panashkin's" (1923)
- "An Evening at Sukmomyatkin's" (1923)
- "Light-Grey and Light-Blue" (1923)
- "A Book" (1923)
- "How They Composed a Song" (1923)
- "Bird's Sin" (1923)
- "A Silver Ten-Copeck Piece" (1923)
- "Happiness" (1923)
- "A Hero" (1923)
- "A Clown" (1923)
- "Onlookers" (1923)
- "Timka" (1923)
- "A Light-Minded Man" (1923)
- "Strasti-Mordasti" (1923)
- "By Changul River" (1923)
- "A Jolly Chap" (1923)
- "A Romantic" (1923)
- "A Little Girl" (1923)
- "A Fire" (1923)
- "A Theft" (1923)
- "Bandits" (1923)
- "Complaints" (1923)
- Stories of 1922-1924 (Рассказы 1922—1924 годов, 1925)
  - "The Hermit" (Отшельник, 1922)
  - "Unrequited Love" (Tale of Unrequited Love, A Story of Unrequited Love, Рассказ о безответной любви, 1923)
  - "The Story of a Novel" (Рассказ об одном романе, 1923)
  - "Karamora" (Карамора, 1923)
  - "An Enigma" (An Incident, Анекдот, 1923)
  - "The Story of a Hero" (Рассказ о герое, 1924)
  - "The Rehearsal" (Репетиция, 1924)
  - "The Sky-Blue Life" (Голубая жизнь, 1924)
  - "A Story About the Unusual" (Рассказ о необыкновенном, 1924)
- "Murderers" (1925)

== Plays ==
- The Philistines (translated also as Smug Citizens and The Petty Bourgeois; Мещане, 1901)
- The Lower Depths (На дне, 1902)
- Summerfolk (also, Vacationers; Дачники, 1904)
- Children of the Sun (Дети солнца, 1905)
- Barbarians (Варвары, 1905)
- Enemies (Враги, 1906)
- The Last Ones (Последние, 1908)
- Children (translated also as The Reception, Дети, 1910)
- Queer People (Чудаки, 1910)
- Vassa Zheleznova (Васса Железнова, 1910/1936)
- The Zykovs (Зыковы, 1913)
- Counterfeit Money (Фальшивая монета, 1913)
- The Old Man (also: The Judge, Старик, 1915, revised 1922, 1924)
- Workaholic Slovotekov (Работяга Словотеков, 1920)
- Somov and Others (Сомов и другие, 1930)
- Yegor Bulychov and Others (Егор Булычев и другие, 1932)
- Dostigayev and Others (Достигаев и другие, 1933)

== Poetry ==
- "A Maiden and Death" (Девушка и смерть, 1892 [fairytale in verse])
- "The Song of the Stormy Petrel" (Песня о Буревестнике, 1901)
- "A Ballad of Countess Helene de Corsi" (1923)

== Short-story collections ==
- City of the Yellow Devil (Город Жёлтого дьявола, 1906)
- Tales of Italy (Сказки об Италии, 1911–1913)
- Through Russia (По Руси, 1923)
- Stories 1922-1924 (Рассказы 1922—1924 годов, 1925)

== Autobiography ==
- My Childhood (Autobiography Part I, 1913–1914); In the World (Autobiography Part II, 1916); My Universities (Autobiography Part III, 1923)
- Fragments from My Diary (1923)

== Non-fiction ==
- "The Black Hundred Pogromists" (not dated)
- "Russian Tsar" (1905)
- "Magnificent France" (1905)
- "My Interviews" (1905)
- "Fair France" (1905)
- "One of the Kings of the Republic" (1906)
- "Pillar of Morality" (1906)
- "The Masters of Life" (1906)
- "A Priest of Morals" (1906)
- "On the Jews" (1906)
- "On Zionism" (1907)
- "January 9th" (1907)
- "Cynicism" (1908)
- Self-Taught Writers (1911)
- "The Karamazov Spirit" (1913)
- "On the Bolsheviki" (1918)
- Untimely Thoughts (1918)
- My Recollections of Tolstoy (1919)
- "Leonid Andreyev" (1922)
- The Times of Korolenko (1923)
- "N. E. Karonin-Petropavlovsky" (1923)
- "A. P. Chekhov" (1923)
- "Leo Tolstoy" (1923)
- "M. M. Kotsyubinsky" (1923)
- "N. A. Bugrov" (1924)
- About S. A. Tolstaya (1924)
- Days with Lenin (1924)
- V. Lenin (1925)
- "Sergei Yesenin"
- "N. F. Annensky" (1924)
- "About Garin-Mikhailovsky" (1925)
- "About Cockroaches" (1925)
- "Notes of a Leader" (1925)
- "L. B. Krasin"
- "Ten Years" (1927)
- "New and Old" (1927)
- "My Greetings" (1927)
- "To Anonymous and Pseudonymous Writers" (1927)
- "Our Achievements" (1928)
- "Culture" (1928)
- "To Mechanical Citizens of the Soviet Union" (1928)
- "The Red Army" (1928)
- "Benefits of Literacy" (1928)
- "Literary Beginners" (1928)
- "Literature of the Peoples of the USSR" (1928)
- On Guard for the Soviet Union (1930)
- "Women" (1930)
- "Wise Folk" (1930)
- "Humanists" (1930)
- On Literature (1930)
- "A Hurricane Destroying the Old World" (1931)
- "Facts of Life" (1931)
- "Under the Red Banner" (1931)
- "To Participants in the Civil War" (1931)
- Talks on the Craft (1931)
- Literary Technique (1932)
- Socialist Realism (1933)
- "Prose" (1933)
- "On Plays" (1933)
- Soviet Literature (1934)
- "Proletarian Humanism" (1934)
- A History of Woman (1934)
- "Literary Curiosities" (1934)
- The I.V. Stalin White Sea – Baltic Sea Canal (1934)
- Culture and the People (1935)
- "The New Man" (1935)
- "On the Issue of Demons" (1935)
