= Rukavishnikov =

Rukavishnikov (Russian: Рукавишников, from рукавишник meaning mitten-maker) is a Russian masculine surname, its feminine counterpart is Rukavishnikova. It may refer to

- Ivan Rukavishnikov (1877–1930), Russian writer
- Ivan Rukavishnikov (gold miner) (1843–1901), Russian engineer and gold-miner
- Nikolay Rukavishnikov (1932–2002), Soviet cosmonaut
- Olga Rukavishnikova (born 1955), Soviet pentathlete
- Roman Rukavishnikov (born 1992), Russian ice hockey defenceman
- Yulian Rukavishnikov (1922–2000), Russian sculptor
