= Stepan Skitalets =

Russian poet

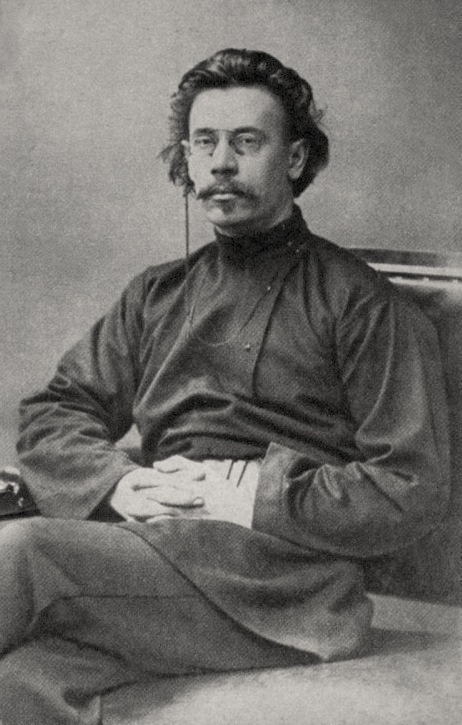
- Born: Stepan Gavrilovich Petrov; 9 November 1869; Samara Province, Russia
- Died: 25 June 1941 (aged 71); Moscow, Soviet Union

An early version of the song «On the Hills of Manchuria» performed by Michael Vavitch, 1912

Stepan Gavrilovich Skitalets (Russian: Степан Гаврилович Скиталец, born Petrov, Russian: Петров; 9 November 1869 – 25 June 1941) was a Russian and Soviet poet, writer of fiction and folk musician. The name Skitalets means "wanderer" in Russian.

== Early life ==
Skitalets was born in Samara Province to a peasant father who had once been a serf. After gaining his freedom Skitalets's father spent some time as a village bartender and later took to wandering through Russia, with his young son in tow, the two making a living together as street and barroom musicians for several years. Afterwards they returned to Samara province where Skitalets's father settled down as a joiner. Skitalets's father taught him to play the gusli, and Skitalets was well known in later life for his skill with the instrument and for being a talented folk singer. He spoke of his early years with his father in a short poem: "His gusli my singer father left, / He left me songs my share, / To sow his peasant seed song gift / To grow in my native air. During the years of wandering with his father he often experienced want and bad conditions, but he was also able to collect a wealth of experiences, meeting different people and travelling widely throughout Russia.

After being expelled from the Samara Teacher's Seminary in 1887 under suspicion of political radicalism, he went out on his own in southern Russia, working as a clerk, actor, singer, writing for several papers, and taking part in the student revolutionary movement.

== Career ==
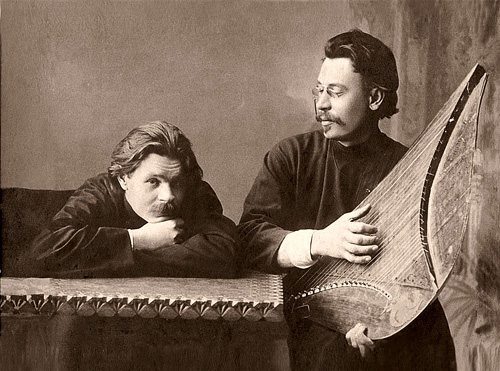
Skitalets playing the gusli with Maxim Gorky.

«Bells are ringing… (in Russian)» romance (music) by Mikhail Steinberg, poem by Stepan Skitalets, performed by Nina Dulkevitsch, 1914

In 1898 he met Maxim Gorky, whose fame was already on the rise, and the two became close friends. This meeting was the deciding point of his young life.
Skitalets came to Moscow with Gorky where he joined the Sreda, a literary group founded by the writer Nikolay Teleshov, which included many of Russia's most popular authors and artists, such as Leonid Andreyev, Ivan Bunin, Fyodor Chaliapin, Gorky and, when he was in town, Anton Chekhov. In 1902 Skitalets's first collection of stories and poems was published by Gorky's company Znanie (Knowledge).

During this time he published poetry, short stories, and novellas, most of which were read and discussed among his friends in the Sreda. One of his songs, which he first sang at a meeting of the Sreda, was included in the beginning of the second act of Gorky's play The Lower Depths. The song begins with the lines: The sun rises and sets / But my prison is dark, dark. He was also the author of a popular folk song about Stepan Razin.

Skitalets's revolutionary poetry was praised by Vladimir Lenin among others. One of his revolutionary poems, recited at a charity event in 1902, can be found on the List of Russian language poets. His reading of this poem and several others caused an uproar of cheers and shouts, leading to the event being broken up by the police, and to the arrest of Leonid Andreyev, who'd been the event's organizer. Andreyev was eventually acquitted in court. Skitalets was arrested for his revolutionary activities in 1888, 1901 (with Gorky in Nizhny Novgorod), 1902 and 1905. He continued publishing his works separately and in collected editions through the years leading up to World War I and the Russian Revolution of 1917.

== Later life ==
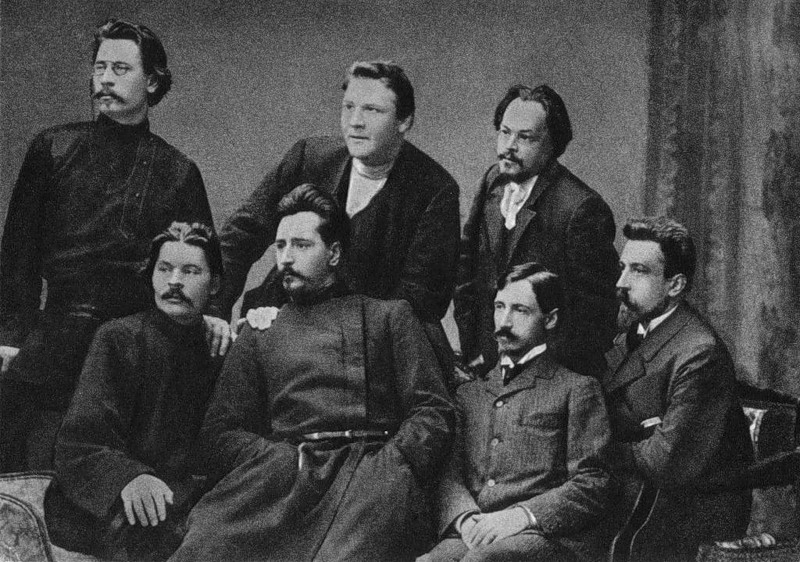
Skitalets (top left), with fellow Sreda members in 1902.

During World War 1 Skitalets served as a medical orderly, and published several works condemning the war. He welcomed and supported the 1917 Revolution. He lived abroad from 1922 to 1934 in Harbin China where he worked for several newspapers, and contributed works to Soviet journals. He also spent some time in Australia on assignment. He returned to Russia in July, 1934, renewed his friendship with Gorky and again took part in literary and social life. He published the novels The House of the Chernovs in 1935 and Fetters in 1940. He died in Moscow in 1941, and was buried in the Vvedenskoye Cemetery.

== English translations ==
- The Love of a Scene Painter, from Short Story Classics (Foreign) Volume 1, P.F. Collier, 1907. from Archive.org
- Icarus, And the Fire Spread, and The Blacksmith, from The Salt Pit and Other Stories, Raduga Publishers, 1988.
