= The Last Ones =

- Original language: Russian
- Written by: Maxim Gorky
- Subject: The decline and fall of the Russian middle-class family
- Genre: Realistic drama
- Setting: The house of Kolomiytsev, the head of the town's police department

The Last Ones (Russian: Последние, romanized: Posledniye) is a 1908 four-act drama by Maxim Gorky.

The play which the author started working on in 1907, was originally called Father (Отец), and was later translated into English as Our Father. It was first published by the Znaniye compilation (book 22) in Saint Petersburg and came out simultaneously as a separate edition in Berlin via the Ivan Ladyzhnikov Publishers.

In a September 1907 letter to Ladyzhnikov Gorky enquired whether in the latter's opinion the play could be staged in Berlin, for in Russia it had no chance of passing the test of censorship. In as soon as October, though, he informed the publisher: "Failure with the “Father” does not upset me, for I know myself, the attempt is unimportant. Leave this thing under a bushel, I hardly ever come back to it". Still, Gorky resumed working upon the play in November and completed it in spring 1908, giving it the new title. He sent it to Konstantin Pyatnitsky, the Znaniye editor, in April. The play was banned from being produced by the Imperial theatres by the Imperial Press Department on 10 June 1908. In 1923 it was included into the Complete Works by Maxim Gorky for the first time and since then started to be produced by the Soviet theatres.

In 1972 the Moscow Art Theatre production of the play was adapted for television by Oleg Efremov, Leonid Pchyolkin and Vladimir Salyuk.
