= Sreda =

Russian writing circle (1899–1916)

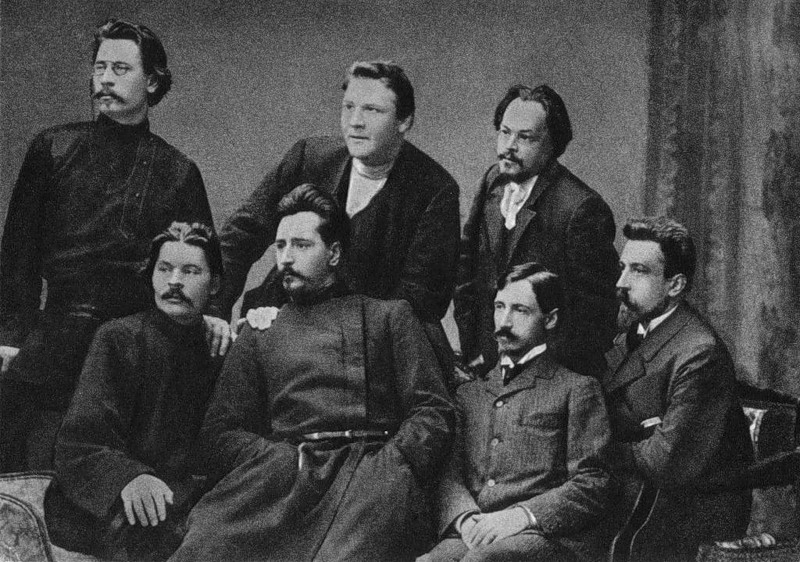
Members of the Sreda, 1902: Top row from left: Stepan Skitalets, Fyodor Chaliapin, Evgeny Chirikov; bottom row from left: Maxim Gorky, Leonid Andreyev, Ivan Bunin, Nikolai Teleshov.

The Moscow Literary Sreda (Russian: Моско́вская Литерату́рная Cреда́, romanized: Moskovskaya Literaturnaya Sreda/Moskovskaja Literaturnaja Sreda) was a Moscow literary group founded in 1899 by Nikolai Teleshov. The name Sreda means Wednesday, taken from the day of the week on which writers and other artists met at Teleshov's home. The last meeting of the Sreda took place in 1916.

== List of Sreda members ==
- Leonid Andreyev
- Pyotr Boborykin
- Ivan Bunin
- Fyodor Chaliapin
- Anton Chekhov (Visitor)
- Evgeny Chirikov
- Sergey Elpatyevsky
- Nikolai Garin-Mikhailovsky (Visitor)
- Maxim Gorky
- Evgeny Goslavsky
- Sergey Gusev-Orenburgsky
- Aleksandr Kuprin
- Vladimir Korolenko (Visitor)
- Isaac Levitan
- Dmitry Mamin-Sibiryak
- Sergey Terentyevich Semyonov
- Alexander Serafimovich
- Ivan Shmelyov
- Stepan Skitalets
- Fyodor Sologub (Visitor)
- Nikolai Teleshov
- Viktor Vasnetsov
- Vikenty Veresaev
- Semyon Yushkevich
- Boris Zaytsev
- Nikolai Zlatovratsky

== See also ==
- Znanie Publishers
