= Serafimovich =

Serafimovich may refer to:

- Serafimovich (town), a town in Serafimovichsky District of Volgograd Oblast, Russia
- Alexander Serafimovich (1863–1949), Russian/Soviet writer
