= Dmitry Mamin-Sibiryak =

Russian author

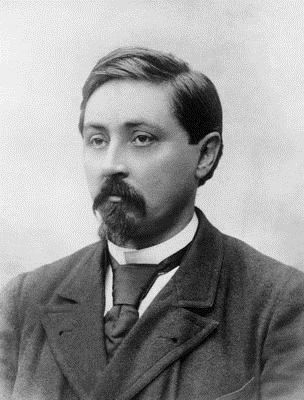
- Born: October 25, 1852; Visim, Verkhotursky Uyezd, Perm Governorate, Russian Empire
- Died: November 2, 1912 (aged 60); St. Petersburg, Russian Empire
- Occupation: Writer
- Writing career
- Period: 1880s–1910s
- Genres: Fiction, drama, children's stories, travel writing
- Subject: Rural Life
- Movement: Realism

Signature
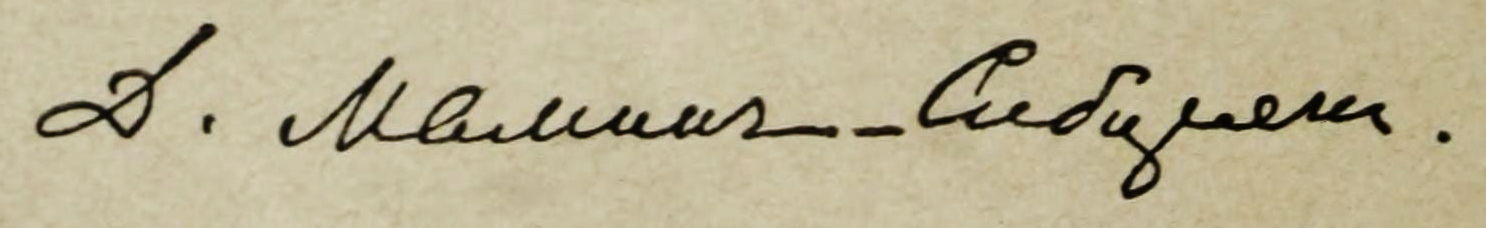

Dmitry Narkisovich Mamin-Sibiryak (Russian: Дми́трий Нарки́сович Ма́мин-Сибиря́к; October 25, 1852 – November 2, 1912) was a Russian writer, well known for his novels and short stories about life in the Ural Mountains.

== Biography ==
=== Early life ===
Mamin-Sibiryak was born in Visim, Perm Governorate in the Urals (in present-day Sverdlovsk Oblast), into the family of a factory priest. He was first educated at home, and then studied in the Visim school for worker's children. He later attended the Yekaterinburg Theological Seminary (1866–1868) and the Perm Theological Seminary (until 1872). In 1872 he entered the veterinary section of the Saint Petersburg Medical Academy. In 1876, not having finished the academy, he transferred to the Law Faculty of St Petersburg University. He studied there for one year and then left, due to health (the beginning of tuberculosis) and financial difficulties.

In the summer of 1877, he returned to his family in the Urals. His father died the following year and all the difficulties of the family fell on Mamin-Sibiryak. In order to find work and educate his brothers and sister the family moved to the large cultural center of Yekaterinburg. There, he married Maria Alekseeva who became his literary adviser as well as his spouse and friend. During these years, he made numerous trips around the Ural region and studied its history, economics, ethnography, and daily life.

From the beginning of the 1880s, he was occupied with literary work.

In 1890, he divorced his first wife and married the actress Maria Abramova from the Yekaterinburg Dramatic Theatre and moved to St Petersburg. Abramova died a year later in childbirth, leaving a sick daughter, Alyonushka, in the arms of a distraught father.

=== Career ===
A series of travel sketches From the Urals to Moscow (1881–1882) were published in the Moscow newspaper Russkie Vedemosti (Russian News). Then his sketches In the Mountains and stories At the Border of Asia and In Bad Souls were published in the journal Delo. Many were signed with the pseudonym D. Sibiryak.

Sibiryak means "Siberian" in Russian. Dmitry later explained how his friends gave him the name:

"I first tried out the names 'Rasskazov' (from the word rasskazy, meaning story) and 'Tomsky' (from the word tom, meaning volume), but they weren't right! My name was an object of fun to my fellow ordinands. Why were we 'Mamin' (momma's boys) and not 'Tyatin' (daddy's boys)? They decided the best pseudonym was Sibiryak. After all, Yekaterinburg is the other side of the Urals, and Russians regard everything beyond the Urals, including Siberia, as all one!"

His first major work was The Privalov Fortune (1883) which was serialized to great success in the journal Delo. The publication of the novel Mountain Nest in 1884 in the journal Otechestvennye Zapiski (Notes of the Fatherland) cemented the reputation of Mamin-Sibiryak as an accomplished realist.

Repeated trips to the capital (1881–2, 1885–6) extended Mamin-Sibiryak's literary contacts. He became acquainted with Anton Chekhov, Gleb Uspensky, Vladimir Korolenko and others. During these years, he wrote and published many short stories and sketches. From 1899 until his death, he was associated with the Sreda literary group, and the Znanie publishing company, ran by fellow Sreda member Maxim Gorky.

His last major works were the novels Traits from the Life of Pepko (1894), Falling Stars (1899) and the story "Mumma" (1907).

In his novels and stories he portrayed the life of the Urals and Siberia in the reform years of the development of capitalism in Russia and the consequent rifts in public consciousness, legal norms and morals. His most well known works are The Privalov Fortune (1883), Mountain Nest (1884), Gold (1892), Bread (1895), the novella Okhonna's Brows (1892) and the collections Ural Stories (1895) and Siberian Stories (1889).

His widely known children's books included Tales for Alyonushka (1894–1896), Grey Neck (1893), and Summer Lightning (1897).

== Notes ==
=== English translations ===
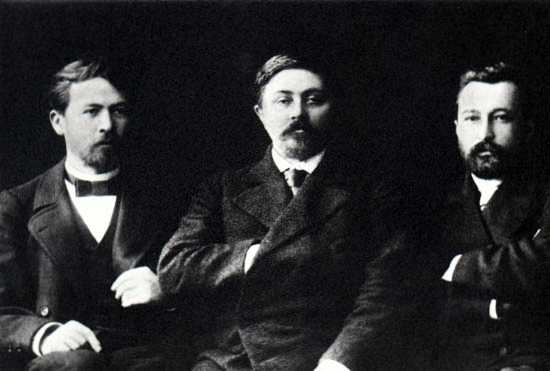
Mamin-Sibiryak (center), with Anton Chekhov (left) and Ignaty Potapenko.

- The Privalov Fortune, (novel), Foreign Languages Publishing House, Moscow.
- Misgir, and The Father Elect, (stories), from Little Russian Masterpieces, Vol 2, G.P. Putnam's Sons, New York and London, 1920.
- Verotchka's Tales, (children's stories), E.P. Dutton & Company, New York, 1922. from Archive.org
- Wintering Station on Chill River, (story), from A Bilingual Collection of Russian Short Stories, Vol 1, Random House, 1965.
- Tales For Alyonushka, (children's stories), Progress Publishers, Moscow, 1978.
- A Gold Nugget, (story), from In the Depths: Russian Stories, Raduga Publishers, Moscow, 1987.
