= Markovo Republic =

1905–1906 self-proclaimed state in Russia

The Markovo Republic (Russian: Марковская республика) was a self-proclaimed peasant state in Russia, located about 150 kilometers outside of Moscow, in the Volokolamsk district. It was proclaimed on 31 October 1905, when during the Russian Revolution of 1905 peasants assumed the power in the Markovo volost centered in the village Markovo. The republic revolt was put down on 18 July 1906, six months after the revolution had been put down in the cities. The state has been viewed as "one of the most impressive examples of progressive peasant politics during the 1905 Revolution".

One of the republic's founders were the writer and Tolstoyan Sergey Semyonov, from the nearby village of Andreevskoe.

== History ==
The republic was founded by a group consisting of several teachers, agronomists, activists and peasants (including Semyonov) from Markovo and nearby villages; the group had been meeting in tea rooms and reading-clubs since 1901 to discuss the newspapers from Moscow. After its establishment in several volosts in the Volokolamsk district, it organized peasant rule in what has been described by historian Orlando Figes as a 'sophisticated system'. A Peasant Union was organized, which constituted the political structure of the 'republic'. A 'republican government' was elected, headed by a president – a position held by one of the peasant elders – and it declared allegiance to the Peasant Union. In October 1905 a resolution calling for radical reforms of the political system was passed by a general meeting of peasants; in it the peasants declared that would refuse to obey the current authorities, and refuse taxation and army recruitment until its demands were met. Demands included the convocation of a national parliament, universal suffrage with secret ballots for adults, equal civil rights for peasants, progressive taxes, land grants for landless peasants, a free and universal education system, political amnesty and freedom of movement.

Once established, local branches were organized in nearby villages, including one in Andreevskoe by Semyonov; these in practice governed the villages during the republic's existence. A control over rents, an implementation and introduction of agronomic measures, a democratization of volost government and 'nationalization' of church schools happened. Meanwhile, the Tsarist government stood powerless as only one police sergeant and no land captain was in the volost, and was therefore unable to put down the increasingly famous and large republic. The peasant republic was written of in American newspapers, and this brought a Chicago professor to Markovo to lend it support. As leader of the Peasant Union in his native village Andreevskoe, Semyonov had established two cooperatives, a new village school, an agricultural farming society, a reading club, and even a peasant theatre.

The Tsarist authorities tried dissolving the self-proclaimed state by political means, by dismissing the elected volost elder Ryzhkov; the defiant peasants countered this by refusing to elect a successor, and Ryzkhov declared, 'to his sorrow', that he could not give up his power as there was no one to give it to. The autonomous self-proclaimed republic was only destroyed in July 1906, six months after the revolution had been crushed in the cities; Ryzkhov was removed through a police trick, and all the villages of the republic was raided, with its leaders (among them Semyonov) sent to prison in Moscow. The police had been informed that 'the village contained a dangerous revolutionary' by Semyonov's arch-rival in Andreevskoe, chief elder Grigory Maliutin; after two months in prison in Moscow, Semyonov was sent into exile abroad; here, with the financial aid of Tolstoy, he toured the English and French countryside for eighteen months, where, inspired by what he saw, became even more determined to reform the Russian communal system.

== Bibliography ==
- Ferguson, Niall (2006). The War of the World: Twentieth-Century Conflict and the Descent of the West. Penguin Press. ISBN 1-59420-100-5.
- Figes, Orlando (2014). A People's Tragedy: The Russian Revolution 1891–1924. London: The Bodley Head. ISBN 9781847922915.
