= Sergey Gusev-Orenburgsky =

Russian writer

Gusev-Orenburgsky
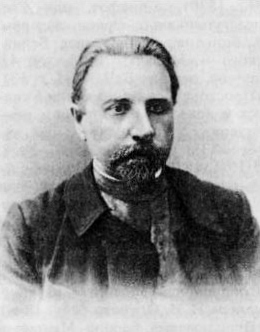
- Born: October 5, 1867; Orenburg, Russia
- Died: June 1, 1963 (aged 95); New York City, United States

Sergey Ivanovich Gusev-Orenburgsky (Russian: Серге́й Иванович Гусев-Оренбургский) (October 5, 1867 – June 1, 1963) was a writer from the Russian Empire. He was a member of the Moscow literary group Sreda.

== Biography ==
Gusev-Orenburgsky was born into the family of a merchant. In 1893 he became a village priest, but left the priesthood in 1898.

He began publishing his works in 1890. He was greatly influenced by his acquaintance with Maxim Gorky and by his participation in the Znanie (Knowledge) collections, which published his best works, including the novella In the Parish (1903), and the novel The Land of the Fathers (1905). Gusev-Orenburgsky wrote about the impoverishment of the Russian countryside and criticized the church and its ministers. The Land of the Fathers depicts the development of revolutionary events in the city and countryside and creates the image of the peasant-revolutionary.

After the October Revolution he emigrated to Harbin in 1921. It was there in 1922 that a Jewish aid organisation published his detailed account of pogroms against Jews in Ukraine in 1919-20. A censored version was published in the Soviet Union in 1923 with an introduction by Maxim Gorky. In 1923 he emigrated to the United States and lived in New York. In 1928 he published the novel The Land of the Children.

== English translations ==
- The Land of the Fathers, (novel), The Dial Press, NY, 1924.
- The Land of the Children, (novel), Longmans, Green and Co, NY, 1928.
