= Konstantin Pyatnitsky =

Konstantin Petrovich Pyatnitsky
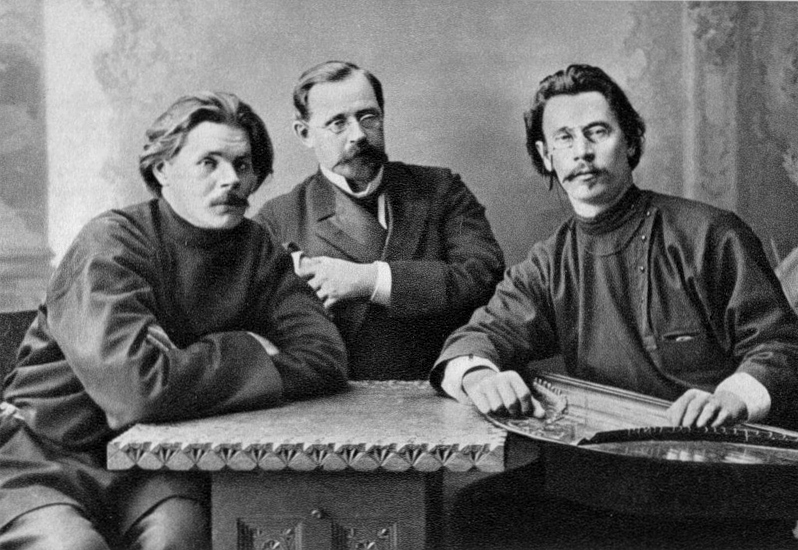
- Pyatnitsky (middle) with Maxim Gorky (right) and Stepan Skitalets, 1902
- Born: Константин Петрович Пятницкий; 31 March 1864; Valdaysky Uyezd, Novgorod Governorate, Russian Empire
- Died: 6 January 1938 (aged 73); Leningrad, USSR
- Occupations: publisher, editor, memoirist
- Years active: 1890s-1930s

Konstantin Petrovich Pyatnitsky (Russian: Константин Петрович Пятницкий; 31 March 1864 – 6 January 1938) was a Russian journalist, publisher and memoirist from the Russian Empire and Soviet Union. Pyatnitsky was a co-founder of the publishing company Znanie and one–time close associate of Maxim Gorky.

== Biography ==
Konstantin Pyatnitsky was born in the village of Kemtsy, Valdaysky Uyezd, Novgorod Governorate, to the family of a local priest. After he graduated in 1888 from the Kazan University he moved to Saint Petersburg and joined the Committee for Literacy (1892–1895) and also the staff of Mir Bozhy magazine, where he worked from 1893 till 1896.

In 1898 Pyatnitsky founded Znanie publishing company and became its executive director and editor. In 1900 he invited Maxim Gorky to join it and found himself under the latter's strong influence. He signed an agreement with RSDRP which obliged Znanie to publish the Marxists materials. In 1909, facing prosecution, Pyatnitsky left Russia. He returned in 1913, a year after Gorky had left Znanye, disillusioned with its policies.

After the 1917 Revolution Pyatnitsky served as a director of the House of Science's library. In 1919 he handed off 250 thousand book copies from the Znanye storehouses to the Bolshevik Ministry of Education. In 1937 he published a book of memoirs called M. Gorky Back Home (М. Горький на родине). He died in Leningrad in 1938.
