= The Life of a Useless Man =

Novel by Maxim Gorky

- 1971 edition
- Author: Maxim Gorky
- Original title: Жизнь ненужнаго человѣка
- Language: Russian
- Genre: Political novel
- Publisher: Znaniye
- Publication date: 1908
- Publication place: Russia
- Media type: Print (Paperback & Hardback)
- Followed by: A Confession

The Life of a Useless Man (pre-reform Russian: Жизнь ненужнаго человѣка; post-reform Russian: Жизнь ненужного человека, romanized: Zhizn' nenuzhnogo cheloveka, also translated as The Spy: The Story of a Superfluous Man) is a 1908 novel by Maxim Gorky. It concerns the "plague of espionage" under the Empire; the protagonist is Yevsey Klimkov, who spies for the Tsarist regime.

== Plot ==
The orphan boy Yevsey Klimkov is apprenticed to the owner of a shop, who secretly sells prohibited revolutionary books and then informs on his customers to the police. The bookseller is murdered, and the bereft, frail, and weak Klimkov is coerced by the Tsarist police to be a spy and informer.

Klimkov admires the revolutionaries, but lives in fear of being discovered by them. He consoles himself that he is just following orders, but when unable to gather sufficient information, he makes it up. The role of the agent provocateur is commended to Klimkov, and he takes it: he encourages some revolutionaries to produce illegal pamphlets, supplies them with the printing facilities, and then has them arrested. His reward is 25 rubles for sending seven people to prison.

Torn inside, Klimkov confesses to one of the revolutionaries, then tries to assassinate the police chief in revenge of his plight. He fails, and then hangs himself.

== Background ==
Maxim Gorky completed The Life of a Useless Man in the summer of 1907, before The Confession, although The Confession was published first. It was not possible to publish the book In Russia, so it was published in Berlin by I. P. Ladyzhnikov.

On February 24, 1910, a report to the Russian Central Committee of Foreign Censorship characterized the book with "The author sets out to contrast the nastiness of the [government] spies and provocateurs on the one hand with the nobility of the revolutionaries on the other... and since the author frequently mentions the Tsar and the revolutionaries' intentions regarding his person, and makes it clear that every bad thing that is done in Russia is done for the glory of the Tsar and at his command... It is clear that this book should not only be banned, but not issued on petition." The Committee classified the novel as "Prohibited, not to be distributed".

In 1914 the publishing house Life and Knowledge (Russian: Жизнь и знание) decided to release The Life of a Useless Man in the tenth volume of Gorky's works. The book was printed but distribution was delayed by censorship. In February 1914 the St. Petersburg Press Committee decided to initiate criminal proceedings against Gorky and seize all copies of the book. On May 19, 1914, this decision was carried out, and most of The Life of a Useless Man was cut out of all 10,400 copies of the volume.

Cuttings – the two thirds of the book that depict the activities of the organs of the tsarist secret police – was published in Russia in 1917, Life and Knowledge noting "The court having upheld the censorship, we managed to save only the first six and a half chapters from destruction. And we could only offer a bland note that 'circumstances beyond our control have forced us to offer this book in extremely abbreviated form' – the Tsarist censor did not allow us to print anything else about this... currently we are releasing, as the second book of the tenth volume, the entire ending, beginning with Chapter 7, of this work by Gorky, guided by the fact that many readers have already purchased the first six chapters which we released in the tenth volume, and which we will now consider only the first book of this volume".

The Life of a Useless Man was translated into English by Moura Budberg, Gorky's secretary and common law wife.
