= Andreyevskoy (Shakhovskoy District) =

Borough in Shakhovskoy District, Moscow Oblast, Russia

Coordinates: 55.9708°N 35.6000°E

Andreyevskoy is a borough in Shakhovskoy District, Moscow Oblast, Russia.

Peasant writer Sergey Semyonov was born in the village of Andreyevskoy. In 1905–06, Andreyevskoy was part of the short-lived peasant Markovo Republic.
