= The Giant Cockroach =

Fairy tale poem by Korney Chukovsky

- by Korney Chukovsky
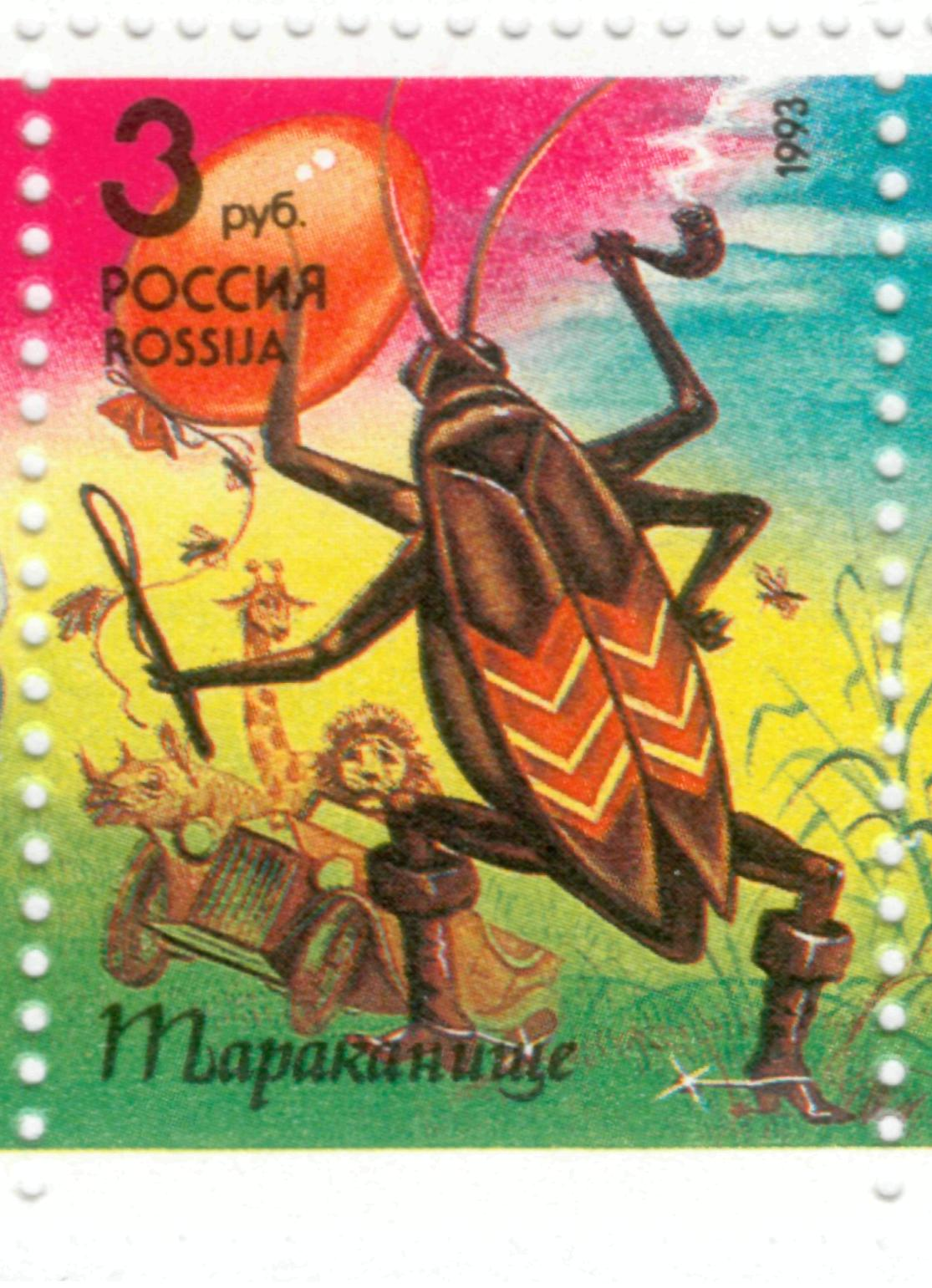
- Tarakanishche on a Russian postage stamp, 1993
- Original title: Тараканище
- Country: Soviet Union
- Genre: Fairy tale
- Publisher: Raduga Publishers
- Publication date: 1921

The Giant Cockroach or The Roach (as translated by Miriam Morton, 1958) or Cock-The-Roach (as translated by Tom Botting, 1981), also popularly known by its Russian name Tarakanishche (lit. 'Тараканище'), is a popular Russian children's fairy tale poem written by poet Korney Chukovsky in 1921. The poem was later published by Raduga Publishers in 1923 and is regarded as a cultural poetic heritage among Russophones. It tells the story of an overgrown cockroach who assumed power over mankind and animals by bullying and threatening them, only to fall prey to a sparrow in the end.

== In popular culture ==
It is a common misconception that The Roach who scared everybody was Chukovsky's hint at Joseph Stalin. In fact, the poem was written way before Stalin came to power. This misconception was exacerbated by the famous "Stalin Epigram" by Osip Mandelstam, in which "giant moustaches of a cockroach are smiling" are given in Stalin's portrait, and some commenters think it was an intentional reference to Chukovsky's "Tarakanishche", given the widespread knowledge of Chukovsky's poem. In the only found facsimile of the epigram Mandelstam used the similarly rhyming image "giant eyes of the cockroach are smiling" ("Тараканьи смеются глазища" rather than "Тараканьи смеются усища"). Although contemporaries recall "moustaches", a plausible guess is that Mandelstam feared to put this word in writing: since Chukovsky's poem ends in the execution of The Roach, the epigram would mean a death sentence to the author.

The poem was referenced during the 2020–2021 Belarusian protests, where protesters referred to incumbent president Alexander Lukashenko due to his moustache as the titular insect, chanting "Stop the Cockroach". Protests in Belarus broke out before and after the disputed 2020 Belarusian presidential election, and the moment calling for the so-called the Anti-Cockroach Revolution or the Slipper Revolution (the latter name is based on a popular cliche advice to whack a cockroach with a slipper), was initiated by businessman and blogger Sergei Tikhanovsky, referring to Lukashenko's derogatory nickname "moustachy cockroach" hinting at the poem.
