= Sergey Semyonov (writer) =

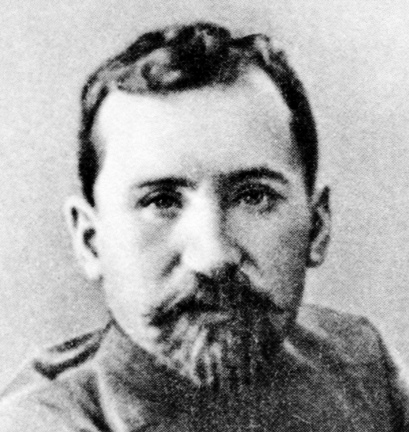
- Born: March 28, 1868; Moscow Governorate, Russia
- Died: December 3, 1922 (aged 54); Moscow Governorate, Soviet Union

Sergey Terentyevich Semyonov (Russian: Серге́й Терентьевич Семёнов; March 28, 1868 – December 3, 1922) was a Russian writer and a member of the Moscow literary group Sreda.

== Biography ==
Semyonov was born in the village of Andreyevskoy, in Moscow Governorate, where his parents were peasants. He left the village because of poverty and worked as an errand boy, salesman, plumber, laborer, and even as a guide for a blind merchant. These experiences gave him material for his writings. His first story Two Brothers (1887) was praised by Leo Tolstoy, who supported and encouraged Semyonov throughout their long acquaintance. His debut, 1894 collection Krestyanskiye rasskazy (Peasant Stories) came out with a foreword by Tolstoy, who cited "sincerity, substantiveness, simplicity and seriousness, as well as the expressiveness of language, rich in folklore imagery" as the author's prose major features. He published poetry, several plays, a book of memoirs called Twenty-Five Years in the Village, and a volume of essays. The Collected Works by S.T. Semyonov in six volumes (1909-1913, via Posrednik Publishers) received the Russian Academy of Sciences' Award in 1912.

In 1906 he was exiled for his revolutionary connections. After the Revolution of 1917, he took an active part in reorganization efforts. In 1922 Semyonov was murdered by bandits, an event that shook his friend Maxim Gorky very deeply. Gorky said that the great significance of Semyonov's works had been recognized, and that nothing could be more precious to a man.

== English translations ==
- The Servant, (Short story), from Best Russian Short Stories, Thomas Seltzer, Boni and Liveright, 1917.
- Gluttons, (Short story), from The Salt Pit, Raduga Publishers, 1988.
