= Alexander Serafimovich =

Russian and Soviet writer

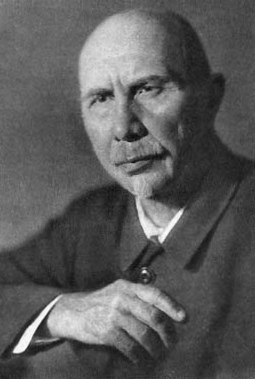
- Born: January 19, 1863 stanitsa Nizhnekurmoyarskaya, Don Host Oblast, Russian Empire (present-day Tsimlyansky District, Rostov Oblast, Russia)
- Died: January 19, 1949 (aged 86); Moscow, USSR
- Writing career
- Genre: Fiction
- Notable work: The Iron Flood

Alexander Serafimovich (born Alexander Serafimovich Popov; Russian: Алекса́ндр Серафимо́вич Попо́в; O.S. January 7 (N.S. January 19), 1863 – January 19, 1949) was a Russian and Soviet writer and a member of the Moscow literary group Sreda.

== Biography ==
He was born in a Cossack village on the Don River. His father served as a paymaster in a Cossack regiment. He attended a grammar school, then studied in the Physics and Mathematics faculty of St. Petersburg University. During his time at the university, he became friends with Aleksandr Ulyanov, Lenin's older brother, who introduced him to Marxism. He was later exiled to Mezen, a town in northern Russia, for spreading revolutionary propaganda. While in exile he wrote his first story, which was published in Russkie Vedomosti. It was then that he began using the pseudonym "Serafimovich". After his exile ended, he spent many years living under police supervision.

In 1902, he moved to Moscow and became a member of the literary group "Sreda" (Wednesday). During World War I, he was a war correspondent for Russkie Vedomosti.

At the start of the 1917 Russian Revolution he joined the Bolsheviks, and became a member of the Russian Communist Party (b). In 1918, he became the literary editor of Izvestia. His best known work of this time is the novel The Iron Flood (1924) set during the Russian Civil War and based on a real incident of the Red Taman Army escaping encirclement by the enemy Whites. He also wrote a stage adaptation of The Iron Flood, which was produced by Nikolay Okhlopkov at the Realistic Theatre in Moscow and was the subject of several film proposals by Sergei Eisenstein. The Iron Flood was widely translated into a variety of languages, such as Korean and used to advance Soviet and Communist ideology.

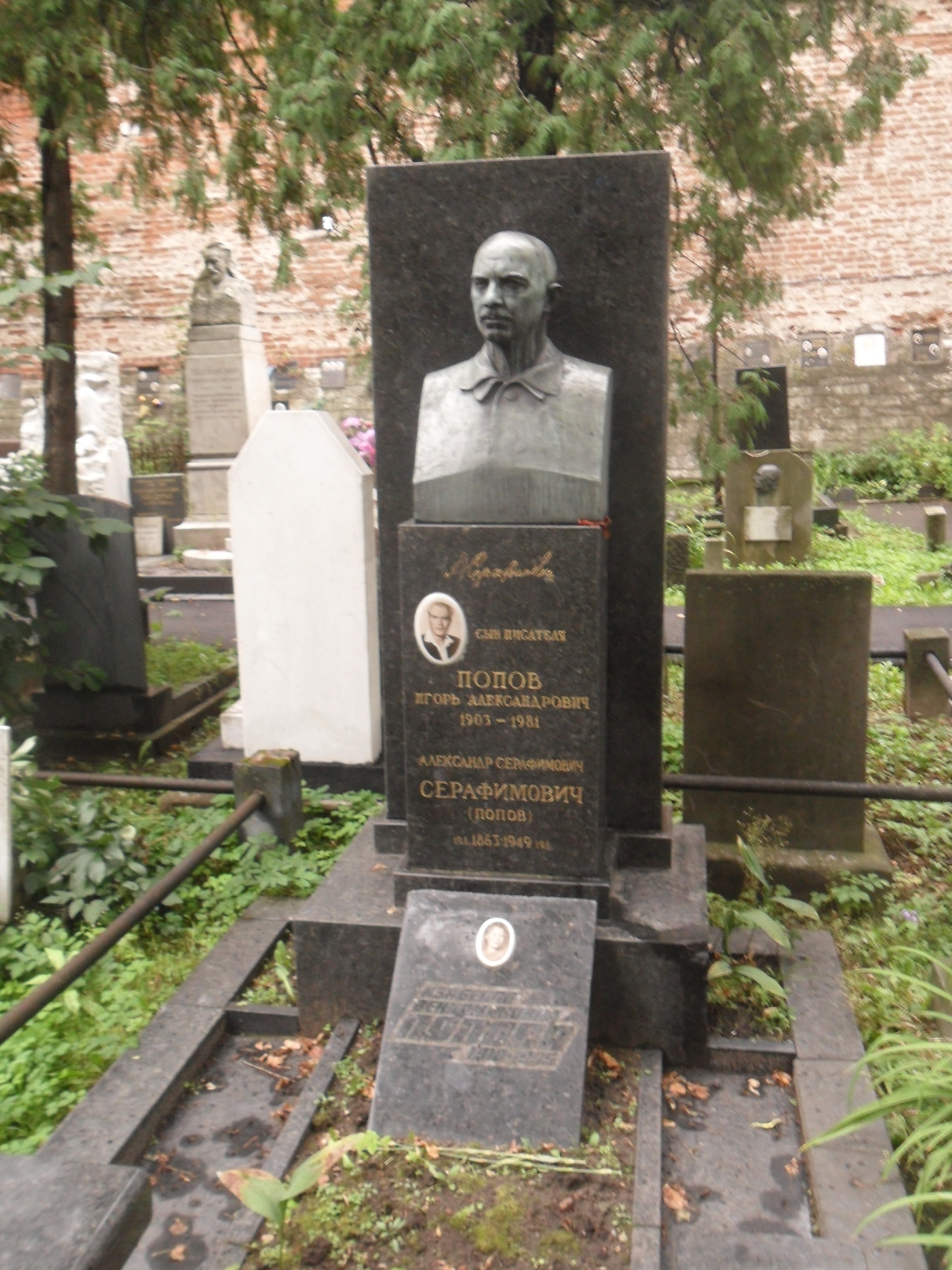
Grave of Alexander Seframovich athe Novodevichy Cemetery

After The Iron Flood, he published stories, sketches and plays about the building of the Soviet state and the growth of Soviet culture. From November 1926 to August 1929 Serafimovich was the editor-in-chief of the magazine Oktyabr. In 1927 he was the first to read the manuscript of Mikhail Sholokhov's novel And Quiet Flows the Don and published the book in the magazine in 1928.

In 1934, he was elected to the governing board of the Union of Soviet Writers. He died in Moscow in 1949.

== Legacy ==
Serafimovich's works were praised by many of his fellow writers. Maxim Gorky especially appreciated his talent, introducing him into the Sreda group in Moscow and publishing his works in the Znanie collections. Leo Tolstoy liked his short novel Sand.

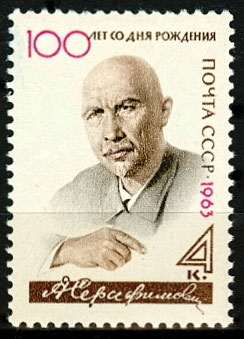
Soviet 1963 commemorative stamp for Serafimovich's 100th birthday

The Nobel Laureate Mikhail Sholokhov said of him:

"Serafimovich was a great man, a real artist whose stories are near and dear to us; he was one of that generation of writers from whom we learned in our youth."

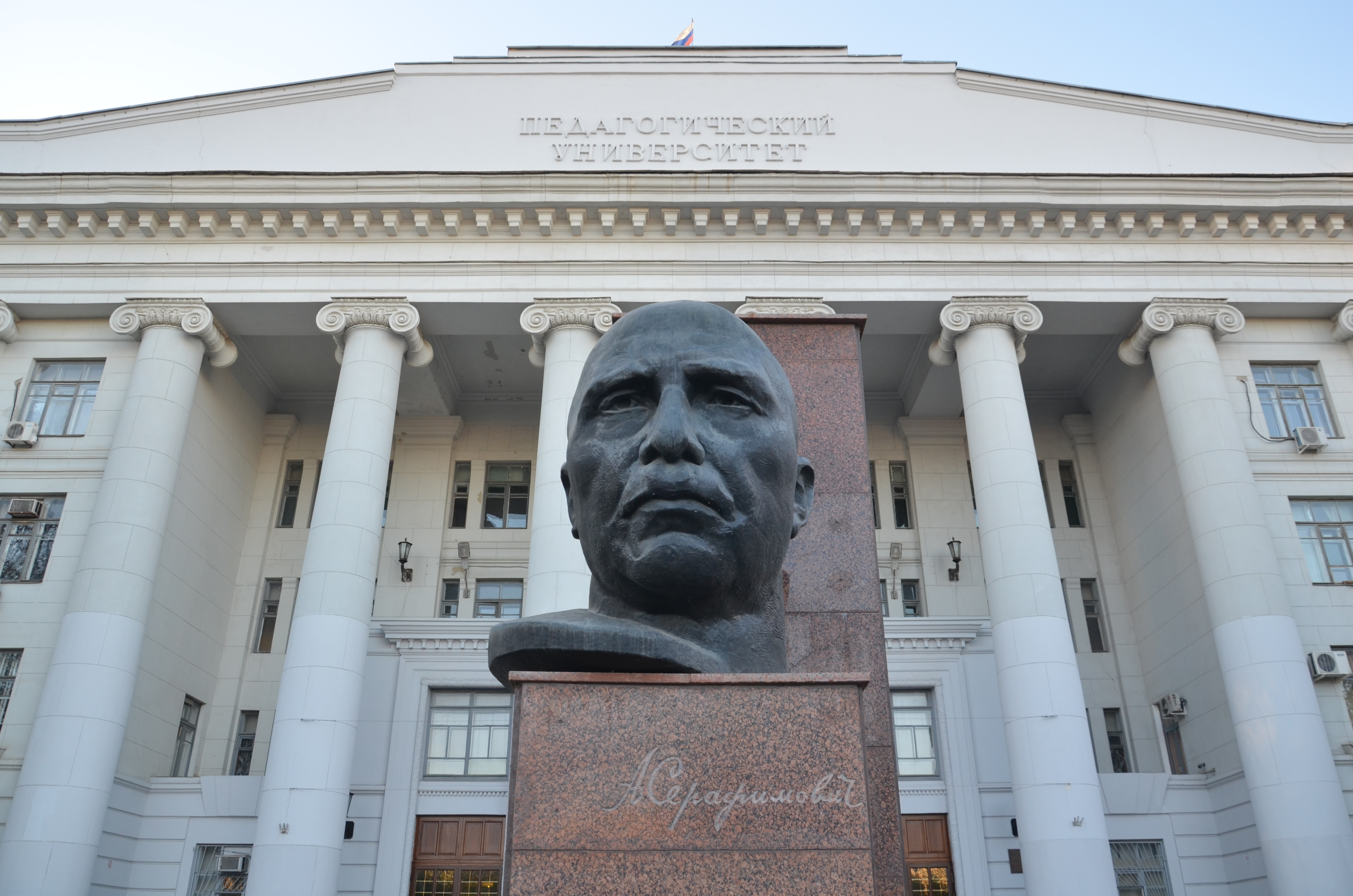
Bust of Alexander Seframovich in front of the Volgograd State Pedagogical University

Vladimir Korolenko said of Serafimovich's first story On the Ice (1889):

"Splendid language, full of imagery, terse and powerful, the descriptions bright and lucid."

== Awards and honors ==
- Order of Lenin (1933)
- Stalin Prize, 1st class (1943) - for long-term excellence in literature
- Order of the Badge of Honour (1939)
- Order of the Red Banner of Labour (1943)
- Medal "For Valiant Labour in the Great Patriotic War 1941–1945"

== English translations ==
- The Iron Flood, Foreign Languages Publishing House, Moscow, 1956.
- Sand and Other Stories, Foreign Languages Publishing House, Moscow, 1956.
- Nikita, The Little Miner and Bombs, from In the Depths, Raduga Publishers, Moscow, 1987.
