= A Confession (Gorky) =

Book by Maxim Gorki

- Author: Maxim Gorky
- Original title: Исповедь
- Language: Russian
- Publisher: Znaniye (compilation)
- Publication date: 1908
- Publication place: Russian Empire
- Media type: Print (Paperback & Hardback)
- Preceded by: The Life of a Useless Man

A Confession (Russian: Исповедь, romanized: Ispoved') is a 1908 short novel by Maxim Gorky. It first appeared in the Znaniye compilation (book 23, Saint Petersburg) and almost simultaneously came out as a separate edition via the Ladyzhnikov Publishers in Berlin.

The tale of Matvey, a pilgrim, was based upon the real-life story of a religious sectarian in Nizhny Novgorod, and an article on him by Bogdan-Stepanets, a tutor at the local seminary. Later, in a sketch called "On the Edge of the World", Gorky mentioned another source, the manuscript by a Levonty Pomorets, which the writer's friend S.G. Somov brought with him from his Siberian exile.

The novel, written in the times when Gorky became keenly interested in the new quasi-religious God-Building movement, horrified Vladimir Lenin who on several occasions criticized the attempts to unite Socialism and Christianity, mentioning A Confession.

Gorky explained: "I am an atheist. In A Confession the idea was to show the means by which man could progress from individualism to the collectivist understanding of the world. The main character sees 'God-building' as an attempt to reconstruct social life according to the spirit of collectivism, the spirit of uniting the people on their way to one common goal: liberating man from slavery, within and without."
