= Vasily Sipovsky =

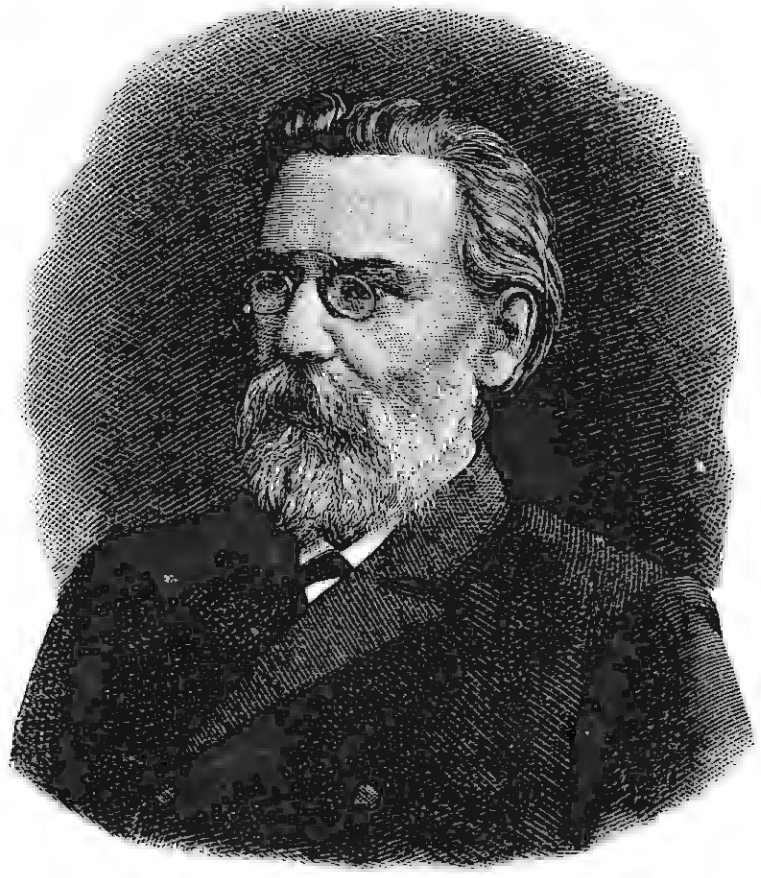
- Born: Василий Дмитриевич Сиповский; Василий Дмитриевич Сиповский; 8 May 1844; Moscow, Russian Empire
- Died: 2 August 1895 (aged 51); Saint Petersburg, Russian Empire
- Occupations: historian, journalist, editor, educational theorist

Vasily Dmitriyevich Sipovsky (Russian: Василий Дмитриевич Сиповский) was a Russian Empire historian, journalist, editor, and pedagogue, personal history tutor for Grand Duchess Xenia Alexandrovna and Grand Duke Michael Alexandrovich.

Sipovsky was born on 8 May 1844 in Uman, and studied philosophy and history at the Saint Petersburg University. Contributing regularly to Semya i Shkola, Russkaya Shkola, Mir Bozhy as well as Obrazovaniye, which he became an editor-in-chief of in 1876, Sipovsky left an extensive legacy, concerning mostly education in Russia, its current affairs and history. Sipovsky's magum opus Rodnaya Starina (Our Times of Old), a popular account of Russian history from the ancient times till Peter the Great, was re-issued 5 times before 1917, and then again in 2008 by Bely Gorod Publishers in Russia. In 1885—1895 Sipovsky was the director of Saint Petersburg College for the Deaf.

Sipovsky died in 1895, in village Lisino, nearby Tosno, and is interred in the Smolensky Cemetery.

His son Vasily Sipovsky (1872–1930) was a well-known Russian philologist.
