= Nikolai Teleshov =

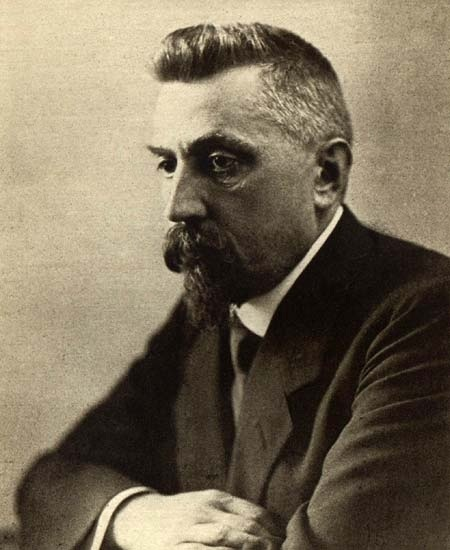
- Born: November 10, 1867; Moscow, Russia
- Died: March 14, 1957 (aged 89); Moscow, Soviet Union

Nikolai Dmitriyevich Teleshov (Russian: Никола́й Дми́триевич Телешо́в) (November 10, 1867 – March 14, 1957) was a Russian Soviet writer.

== Biography ==
Teleshov was born in Moscow where his father was a merchant. His poems were first published in 1884. In the 1880s and 1890s he wrote short stories and novellas, including the story he's best known for, The Duel (1903), the story The Christmas Tree of Mitrich (1897). He also wrote sketches and stories portraying the disastrous fate of resettled peasants in Siberia.

In 1899 Teleshov organized a literary circle in Moscow known as the Sreda (Wednesday) literary gathering. Among its members were many of Russia's most popular writers, such as Maxim Gorky and the future Nobel Laureate Ivan Bunin. Teleshov also participated in publishing the collections of the Znanie association, managed by Gorky.

After 1917 he worked for the People's Commissariat for Education and other Soviet institutions. During the Soviet years his most significant works included The Beginning of the End (1933), a novella of the Russian Revolution of 1905–07, the biographical story Maxim Gorky (1950s) and his creative memoirs A Writer Remembers (1925–43). He died in 1957 and was buried at the Novodevichy Cemetery.

== English translations ==
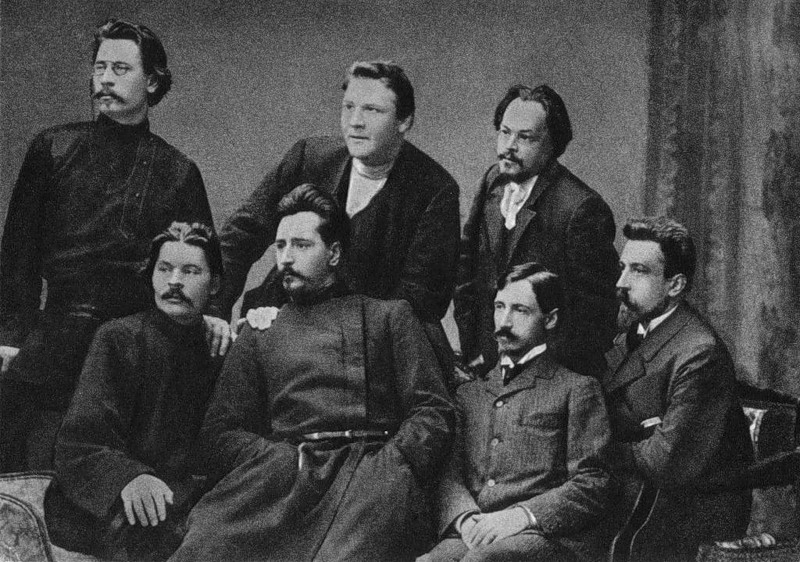
Members of the Sreda in 1902.

- The Duel, Short Story Classics (Foreign) Vol 1, Patten, Collier, NY, 1907. from Archive.org
- A Writer Remembers, Hutchinson, NY, 1943.
