= Vikenty Veresaev =

Russian writer (1867–1945)

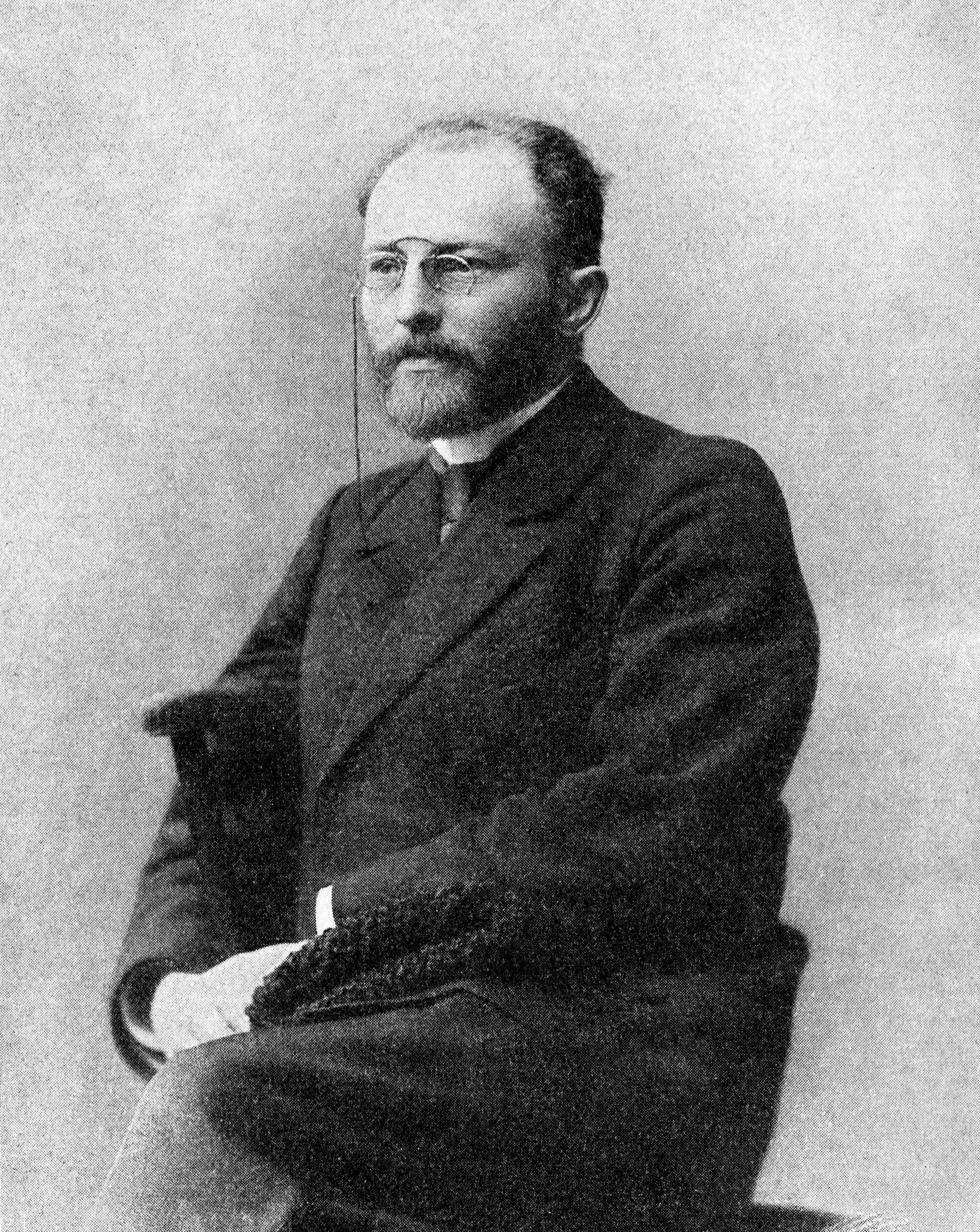
- Born: 16 January 1867; Tula, Russian Empire
- Died: 3 June 1945 (aged 78); Moscow, Soviet Union
- Writing career
- Genres: Fiction, autobiography, criticism, translation
- Notable works: Memoirs of a Physician; In the War; The Deadlock; The Sisters

Signature
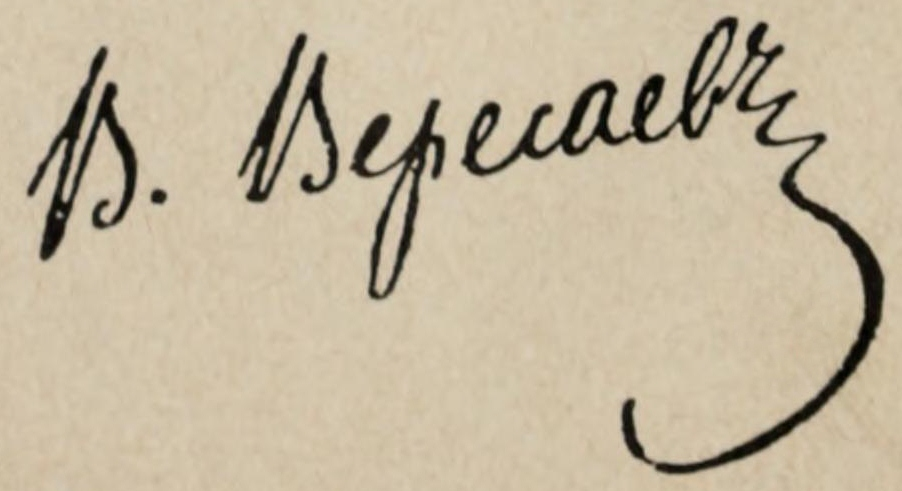

Vikenty Vikentyevich Smidovich (16 January 1867 – 3 June 1945), better known by his pen name Vikenty Vikentyevich Veresaev, (Russian: Вике́нтий Вике́нтьевич Вереса́ев) was a Russian and Soviet writer, translator and medical doctor of Polish descent.

== Early life ==
Veresaev was born in Tula, where his father was a doctor and noble of Polish origin. Veresaev was a cousin of the later prominent Soviet politician, Pyotr Smidovich. After graduating from the Tula gymnasium in 1884, he attended Saint Petersburg University, taking a master's degree in history in 1888. He then enrolled in University of Dorpat/Yuryev and successfully completed a course in medicine. His first work to appear in print was a collection of poems in 1885. His first short story, "The Puzzle", was published in 1887. In 1890 he toured the coal mines of Donetsk with his brother, gathering material for a collection of sketches called The Underground Kingdom, detailing the struggles and hardships of the exploited miners, which he published in 1892.

== Literary career ==
During the 1890s, Veresaev joined a group known as the Legal Marxists, and he published works in such journals as New Word, Inception and Life. During this period he wrote a cycle of works concerning the intelligentsia’s frame of mind at the turn of the 20th century, including the novella Without a Road (1895), the short story "The Craze" (1898) and the novella At the Turning Point (1902). He also wrote about the difficult position of the Russian peasantry, such as in the short story "Lizar" (1899) which was praised by Vladimir Lenin. His short story "On a Dead-end Road" (1896) and the novella Two Ends (1899–1903) were devoted to the life of the workers.

During the first decade of the 20th century Veresaev was a member of the Sreda (Wednesday) literary group and published his works in Maxim Gorky's Znanie collections. He published his most successful book, the semi-autobiographical Memoirs of a Physician in 1901, in which he sharply criticized the system of Russian medical education. In April 1901 he was dismissed from the hospital where he'd been working because of his political views, and was forbidden to live in Moscow or Saint Petersburg for a period of two years.

In 1904, at the outbreak of the Russo-Japanese War, he joined the army as a doctor. He told of his experiences in his book In the War, published in 1906. In this work he showed the heroism of Russian soldiers and officers and, at the same time, the corruption of the tsarist army.

Veresaev also wrote a long critical and philosophical work entitled Vital Life, the first book of which (1910) was devoted to a comparative analysis of Fyodor Dostoevsky (Man Accursed) and Leo Tolstoy (Long Live the Whole World!); the second book, Apollo and Dionysius (1915), was a critique of Friedrich Nietzsche's views. In 1911 Veresaev established the Pisately v Moskve Publishing House which he headed until 1918.

== Later life ==
After the October Revolution, which he welcomed, he devoted much of his time to cultural development and education. He also completed his cycle of works about the intelligentsia, including the novels The Deadlock (1922) and The Sisters (1933). Despite that The Deadlock was frequently published during 1920s, these two novels were banned by the Soviet censors in 1930s and not republished until the Perestroika. He published his reminiscences In the Years of My Youth in 1927 and In My Student Years in 1929. He also translated works by ancient Greek and Roman authors, including Homer's Hymns, Sappho, Archilochus and others. At the end of the 1930s he began to translate the Iliad (published in 1949) and the Odyssey (published in 1953).

For his outstanding achievements in the field of literature Veresaev was awarded the Stalin Prize in 1945. He was also awarded the Order of the Red Banner of Labour. He died in Moscow in June 1945.

Maternity Hospital No. 27 in the Koptevo District of Moscow was named in his honor; its operations were later consolidated into City Clinical Hospital No. 81 on Lobnenskaya Street in Dmitrovsky District, which also bears his name.

== Works ==
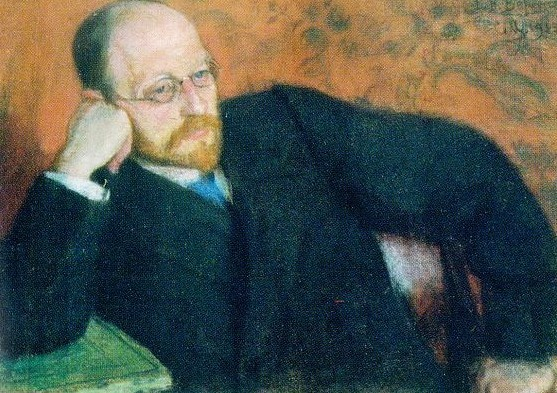
Portrait by Malyutin, 1919.

=== Novels ===
- The Deadlock (1922)
- The Sisters (1933)

=== Short stories ===
- The Salt Pit (collection)

=== Memoirs and autobiographical works ===
- Memoirs of a Physician (1900)
- In the War (1908)

== English translations ==
- Memoirs of a Physician, (autobiography), Alfred A. Knopf, New York, 1916. from Archive.org
- In the War, Mitchell Kennerley, New York, 1917. from Archive.org
- The Deadlock, Faber & Gwyer, 1927.
  - The Deadlock, Hyperion Press, 1974.
- The Sisters, 1933
  - Sisters, Hyperion Press, 1974.
- "In the Steppe", (story), from The Salt Pit, Raduga Publishers, Moscow, 1988.
