= Police supervision =

Police supervision or police monitoring is a form of additional punishment and crime prevention. The regulations vary for various countries. A common feature was restriction and control of the place of residence of the supervised person. In certain situations a released convict was placed under police supervision. In some countries "unreliable persons" (usually in political sense) could be placed under police supervision.

In 1871 regulations for police supervision were summarized in an internal report of Russian chief prosecutor deputy Nikolay Rychkov (Николай Дмитриевич Рычков) for Russian Empire, France, Belgium, Prussia, Bavaria, and German Empire.
