= Semyon Yushkevich =

Russian writer (1868-1927)

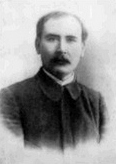
- Born: July 12, 1868; Odessa, Russian Empire
- Died: December 2, 1927 (aged 59); Paris, France

Semyon Solomonovich Yushkevich (Russian: Семён Соломонович Юшкевич, July 12, 1868 – December 2, 1927), was a Russian language writer, and playwright and a member of the Moscow literary group Sreda. He was a representative of the Jewish-Russian school of literature.

Yushkevich studied medicine at the Sorbonne, before beginning his writing career.

Yushkevich's first story was published in 1897, entitled "The Tailor: From Jewish Daily Life" (Портной. Из еврейского быта) in Russkoye Bogatstvo. Yushkevich wrote for the theater, including the 1906 play King (Король). His 1910 play Miserere was staged at the Moscow Art Theatre. Yushkevich wrote novels as well, such as Leon Drei (Леон Дрей). He contributed to the publications Русском Богатстве, Восходе, Мире Божьем, Журнале для всех and others.

During Yushkevich's lifetime, in Petrograd, a 15-volume collection of his works was published.

Yushkevich spent time in Berlin following the Kishinev Pogrom in 1903. Yushkevich emigrated in 1920. He lived in Romania, France, the United States, and Germany before his death in Paris in 1927. Two pieces, "Jewish Luck" (Еврейское Счастье ) and "The Automobile" (Автомобиль) were republished in 2004.
