= Ivan Rukavishnikov =

Russian symbolist poet and writer

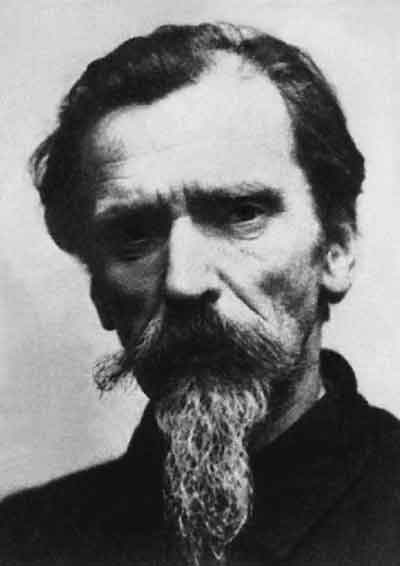
- Rukavishnikov in 1926
- Born: Иван Сергеевич Рукавишников; 15 May 1877; Nizhny Novgorod, Russian Empire
- Died: 9 April 1930 (aged 52); Moscow, Soviet Union
- Occupations: poet, writer, playwright

Ivan Sergeyevich Rukavishnikov (Russian: Иван Сергеевич Рукавишников, 15 May 1877, – 9 April 1930) was a Russian Silver Age symbolist poet, writer, playwright and translator from Ukrainian language.

== Biography ==
Born in Nizhny Novgorod to a millionaire staroobryadtsy merchant, Rukavishnikov studied archeology in Saint Petersburg University. In the 1890s he also studied art, but then, inspired by the early works of Maxim Gorky, decided to devote himself to literature entirely.

Rukavishnikov debuted as a published writer in Nizegorodsky Listok in 1896, then left his father's home, severed all ties with his family and, left without a penny, embarked upon the life of a bohemian in the Russian capital, starting to publish his realist stories in the Gorky-backed Znanye almanacs and his symbolist poems in Vesy, the haven of Russian modernism. In 1901 his first short novel Birds-Eaten Crop (Семя, поклеванное птицами) came out. Three collections of poetry which came out in 1901–1904 made little impact and in retrospect are regarded as unoriginal, forcefully plodding several routes set by the trailblazers of the time like Konstantin Balmont, Andrey Bely and Vyacheslav Ivanov.

Rukavishnikov greeted the 1905 Revolution and became the Socialist Revolutionary Party activist. In those years he also proved to be "an ardent translator of Ukrainian poetry"; the 1909 Young Ukraine anthology forms the 6th volume of his Collected Works.

In 1911 came out his collection of autobiographical sketches First Steps in Literature (Первые литературные шаги). It was followed in by 1912 Rukavishnikov's most popular and significant work, the three-part autobiographical novel The Accursed Family (Проклятый род). Written under the strong influence of Gorky and Korolenko. Another novel, Arkadyevka, came out in 1914, alongside short stories collection Distant and Close (Близкое и далекое), written in experimental, ornamental prose. Several of his fairytale plays were collected in the book Tragic Tales (Трагические сказки, 1915).

Never taken particularly seriously in his time, Rukavishnikov became notorious for his versatility, having published in his lifetime twenty volumes of his work. The large part of it was the experimental poetry, notably in the formal genre of triolet of which he was considered a virtuoso. Two books of Rukavishnikov's triolets came out in 1917 and 1922. In mid-1920s he changed direction again, turning to whimsical folklore stylizations, akin to those for which Ilya Selvinsky would become known. After the 1917 Revolution he founded the Art Museum in Moscow, and after the latter's closure in 1921 went on to lecture as a professor at the Moscow Bryusov Literature and Art Institute.

Ivan Rukavishnikov died of tuberculosis on 9 April 1930 and is interred in Moscow's Vagankovskoye Cemetery. Several authors left memoirs on Rukavishnikov, including Anastasiya Tsvetayeva.
