= Evgeny Chirikov =

Russian writer (1864–1932)

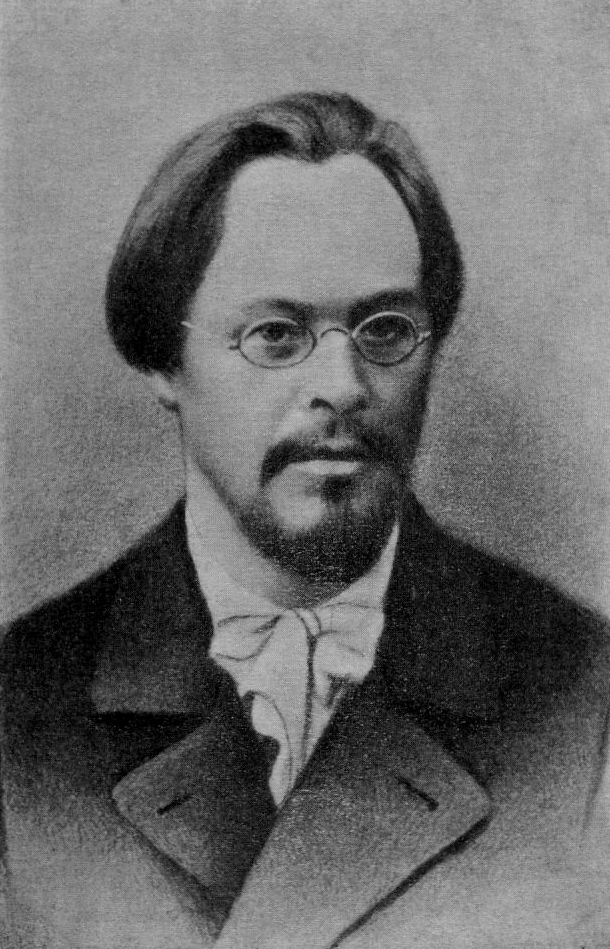
- Born: 5 August 1864; Kazan, Russian Empire
- Died: 18 January 1932 (aged 67); Prague, Czechoslovakia
- Writing career
- Genres: fiction, drama
- Notable works: The Jews; The Life of Tarkhanov

Evgeny Nikolayevich Chirikov (Russian: Евге́ний Никола́евич Чи́риков; 5 August 1864 – 18 January 1932), was a Russian novelist, short story writer, dramatist, essayist and publicist.

== Biography ==
Chirikov was born in Kazan into a gentry family. His father, a former office in the Imperial Russian Army, was a policeman. He studied mathematics at Kazan University, and became interested in populist ideas, joining revolutionary student circles and an early Marxist group founded in Kazan by N. E. Fedoseyev. He was expelled in 1887 for taking part in student demonstrations, and exiled to Nizhni Novgorod. He was arrested in January 1888 for writing and publicly performing an antimonarchist poem, and in 1892 for his involvement in a group of young followers of Narodnaya Volya. He lived in several cities during this time, always under police surveillance.

His first articles appeared in the Kazan newspaper Volga Herald in 1885. He published his first story Red in January 1886, in the same paper. That same year, he met Maxim Gorky while living in Tsaritsyn. A few months later, after moving to Astrakhan, he met radical writer and critic Nikolai Chernyshevsky. He continued to publish his works in the provincial papers until 1894, when one of his stories was accepted by Nikolay Mikhaylovsky for publication in the Saint Petersburg magazine Russkoye Bogatstvo. This publication allowed Chirikov to begin publishing in other major magazines, including Vestnik Evropy and Severny Vestnik.

In the 1890s he moved to Samara, a place that exercised a strong influence on his ideological and artistic evolution. He re-examined his old populist views and maintained steady contact with the marxist movement, and though he never became deeply involved, he continued to hold democratic views. His works of the period give truthful and sympathetic depictions of the life of the peasants and their struggles with poverty and government indifference, and the stale and boring lives of lower and middle-class people living in small towns and cities. He was considered as a successor to the Narodnik writers of the 1860s, such as Nikolai Uspensky, Fyodor Mikhaylovich Reshetnikov, and Alexander Levitov. His works of the late 1890s and early 1900s began to be critical of the Populist movement, drawing negative criticism from Mikhaylovsky and fellow Populist Alexander Skabichevsky, and breaking Chirikov's connection with Russkoye Bogatstvo. In 1900-1901 Chirikov contributed to the magazine Life, which also published works by Gorky and Vladimir Lenin.

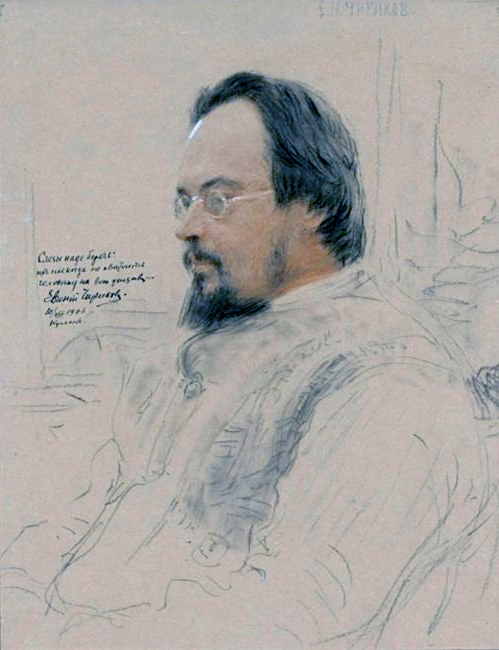
Portrait of Chirikov by Ilia Repin, 1906

After the closing of Life in 1901, he was drawn into the Znanie Publishing Company (Knowledge), by Gorky, which published his collected works in 1908. Chirikov also became a shareholder in Znanie. His most important play The Jews (1903), was directed against national oppression and repression, and the autocratic Tsarist regime. The value of this play, which gained praise from Maxim Gorky, was determined not so much by its artistic qualities, as the relevance of its issues. Its journalistic sharpness, clear demarcation of social characters, and progressive ideological outlook demonstrated an affinity with the dramatic works of Gorky. The play was banned from production on the Russian stage, but was widely performed abroad (Germany, Austria, France and other countries).

The significant ideological and creative growth that Chirikov experienced in the period of the Revolution of 1905 testified to his powerful concern for the social and political problems of the time. In the story "The Rebels" (1905), the drama The Guys (1905), and the story "Comrade" (1906), he was able to faithfully capture the widespread growth of the revolutionary struggle, and the confusion of the authorities under the onslaught of a powerful popular movement.

In the years after the 1905 Revolution, Chirikhov began to disagree with the various changing positions of the revolutionary period: these ideological fluctuations had a negative impact on the writer, leading to his alienation from the revolutionary movement. Chirikov left Znanie and began to publish in decadent journals and collections. This move was regarded by his Marxist friends Gorky, Anatoly Lunacharsky, and Vatslav Vorovsky as an ideological apostasy. Chirikov's departure from the realist tradition started with the publication of his plays Red Lights and Legend of the old castle (both 1907), written under the strong influence of Leonid Andreyev. He next published a series of stories on religious themes ("Temptation", "Devi mountains", etc.), and the play Forest Secrets (1911), styled after the works of Aleksey Remizov. However, Chirikov did not give up his attempts at realism, publishing an autobiographical trilogy of novels entitled The Life of Tarkhanov (1911 - 1914), which included the novels Youth, Exile, and The Return (he later wrote a fourth part, Family).

The 1917 Russian Revolution led Chirikov to completely break with his past democratic sympathies. In 1921 he left Russia and moved to Sofia, Bulgaria, before settling in Prague in 1922. His novel The Beast from the Abyss, written after he left Russia, was critical of the roles of both the Bolsheviks and the White Guards in the Russian Revolution of 1917. He died in Prague in 1932.

== English translations ==
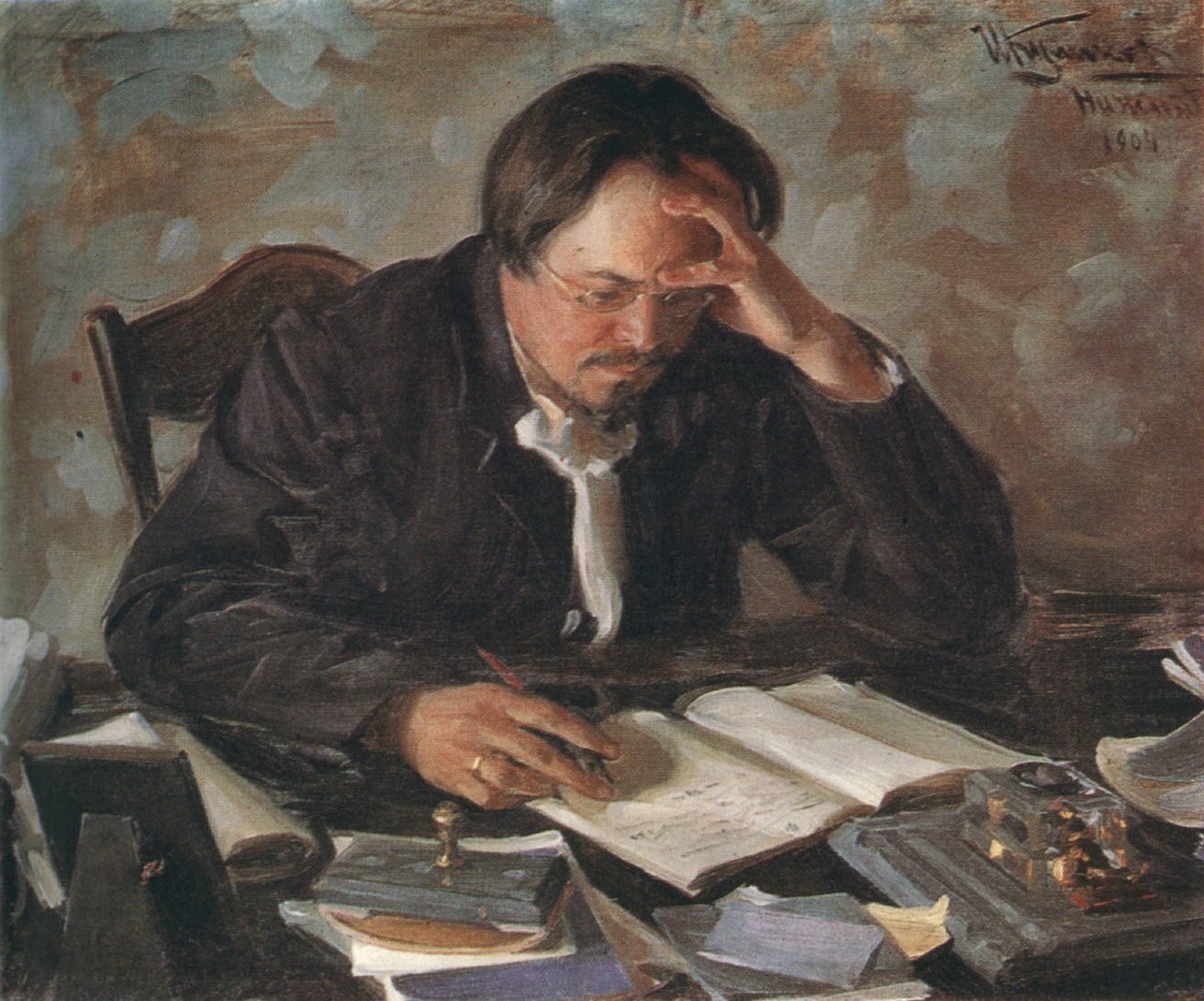
Chirikov at his desk by Ivan Kulikov, 1904.

- "Faust", from Short Story Classics (Foreign) Volume 1, P.F. Collier, 1907. from Archive.org
- "The Past", from The Russian Review, Vol 3, No 1, January 1917.
- Marka of the Pits, Alston Rivers, London, 1930.
- "Bound Over", and "The Magician", from Eight Great Russian Short Stories, A Premier Book, Fawcett Publications, 1962.
- "Faust", and "Strained Relations", from Russian Short Stories, Senate, 1995.
