= Znanie (publishing company) =

Publishing company in Saint Petersburg, Russian Empire

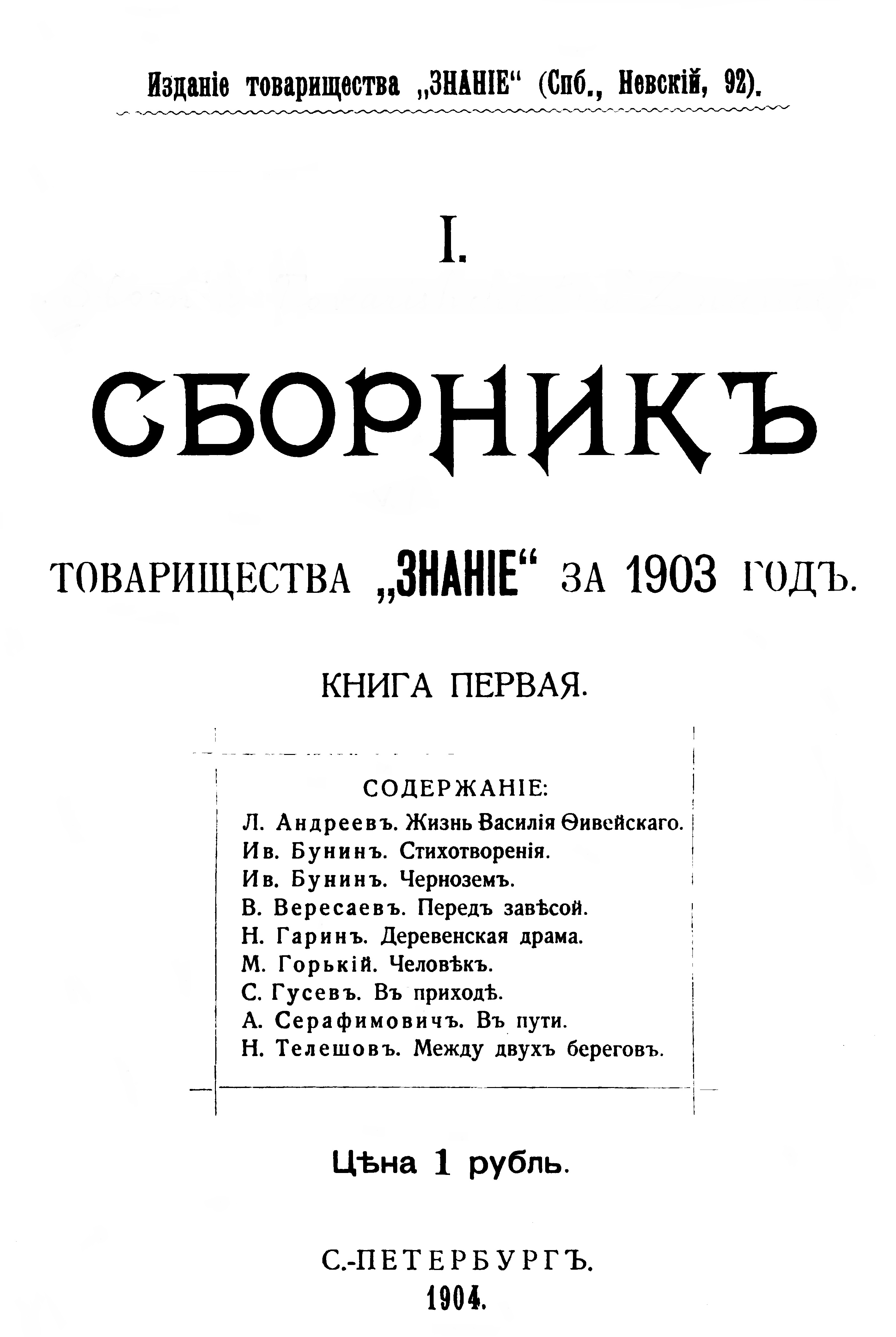
- Company type: Publisher
- Founded: 1898
- Founder: Konstantin Pyatnitsky
- Defunct: 1913
- Headquarters: St Petersburg, Russia
- Key people: Maxim Gorky
- Products: Books, pamphlets

Znanie (Russian: Зна́ние, Znaniye/Znanije; English: Knowledge) was a publishing company based in St. Petersburg, Russia founded by Konstantin Pyatnitsky and other members of the Committee for Literacy. It operated from 1898 to 1913.

== History ==
Znanie initially published books for a mass audience on natural science, history, education, and art. Maxim Gorky joined Znanie in 1900 and became its director in late 1902. Through Znanie, Gorky brought together many of the best known realist writers of the time. Znanie published the collected works of Gorky (9 vols.), Alexander Serafimovich, Alexander Kuprin, Vikenty Veresaev, Stepan Skitalets, Nikolai Teleshov and many others.

Znanie became known as the most progressive of all Russian publishing houses directed toward broad democratic reader-ships. In 1903/1904 the publishing house began issuing the Znanie Collections or, more fully, the Znanie Partnership's Collections for 1903-1913 (Russian: Сборник товарищества "Знание" за 1903-1913 г.г. = Sbornik tovarishchestva "Znaniye" za 1903-1913 g.g.), which brought together short stories, novels, poetry and essays written by Russian writers, and by foreign writers such as Emile Verhaeren, publishing 40 volumes by 1913. Vladimir Lenin wrote that Gorky was aiming through these collections "at a concentration of the best forces of Russian literature." The circulation of the collections reached 65,000 copies. They included the works of Gorky, Anton Chekhov, Kuprin, Serafimovich, Leonid Andreev, Ivan Bunin, Veresaev, Dmitry Mamin-Sibiryak, Sergey Gusev-Orenburgsky, Evgeny Chirikov and Nikolai Garin-Mikhailovsky, among others.

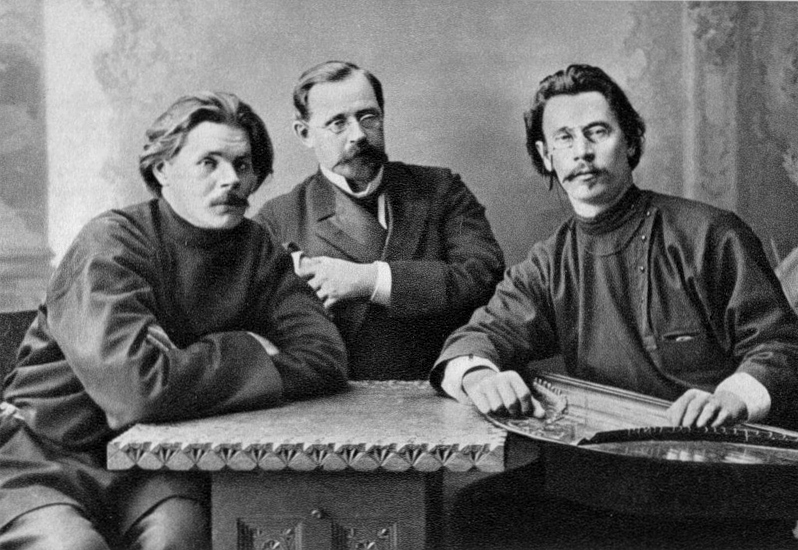
Maxim Gorky, Konstantin Pyatnitsky and Stepan Skitalets, 1902.

The writers featured in the collections from 1905 to 1907 were united in their protest against tsarism, oppression, national discord, religious prejudice, and bourgeois morality. Gorky and Serafimovich, on one hand, used socialist realism; Andreyev and certain others, however, were subject to the influences of the decadent movement. After the 1905 Russian Revolution this difference became more marked. In 1911 principal editorship of the Znanie collections was transferred to Viktor Mirolyubov.

In addition to publishing the collected works of young writers and the Znanie Collections, the Znanie Association issued the so-called Penny Library or Cheap Library (Russian: Дешевая библиотека товарищества "Знание" = Deshevaya biblioteka tovarishchestva "Znanie"), in which the short works of Znanie writers were published. Gorky also carried out assignments for the Bolsheviks, publishing a series of sociopolitical pamphlets, including the works of Karl Marx, Friedrich Engels, Paul Lafargue and August Bebel. The Penny Library issued over 300 publications, with editions totaling nearly four million copies.

During the period of reaction after the 1905 Russian Revolution many participants in Znanie left the publishing house. Gorky, forced to live abroad during this period, severed his ties with the publishing house in 1912.

== See also ==
- Moscow Literary Sreda
