= Raduga Publishers =

Soviet publishing house

- Founded: 1922
- Defunct: 1930
- Country of origin: Soviet Union
- Headquarters location: Bolshoy Gostiny Dvor, Nevsky Prospect, St. Petersburg
- Publication types: Children's books

Raduga Publishers (Russian: радуга, English: "rainbow") was a Soviet publishing house of innovative children's books, which has been described as "one of the most important book publishers of its type" during the early twentieth century.

== History ==
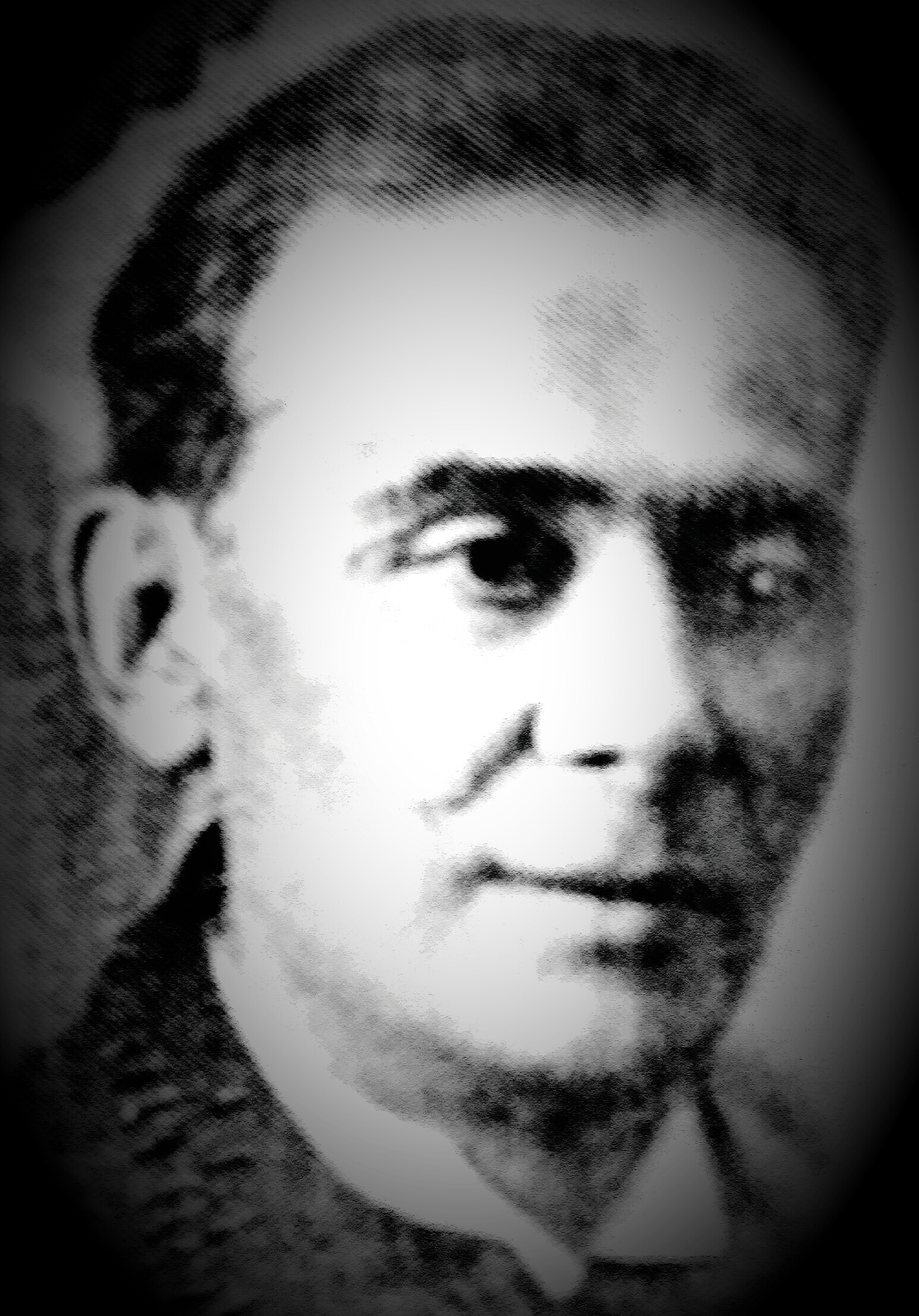
Lev Moisevich Kliachko

Raduga Publishers was founded in 1922 by the Russian journalist Lev Moisevich Kliachko (1873–1939) who was at one time the chairman of the Committee of Journalists at the State Council. The main office was located in Bolshoy Gostiny Dvor building in Nevsky Prospect, St. Petersburg and the editorial office in the founder's apartment at 14 Stremyannaya Street in the same city.

Kliachko originally intended to publish a magazine called Raduga but instead started publishing picture books with texts and illustrations. Early books published by Raduga included Moydodyr (Wash'em Clean) and Tarakanishche (The Monster Cockroach) by Korney Chukovsky, who would become one of the most popular children's poets in the Russian language, and Morozhenoe (Ice Cream), Pozhar! (Fire) and Tsirk (Circus) by Samuil Marshak, whom Maxim Gorky would proclaim as "the founder of Russia's (Soviet) children's literature".

The text in both Moydodyr and Tarakanishche was poetry written for a preschooler audience. The first was illustrated by I. Annenkov and the second by Sergey Chekhonin, both talented artists. Despite Kliachko having little prior knowledge of poetry and almost no capital invested in his firm, Moydodyr and Tarakanishche were "enormous successes" with print runs of 7,000 in both cases.

The Circus and Ice Cream were a collaboration of the writer Marshak and the artist Vladimir Lebedev, with two books embodying "the beginning of a radically new approach to children's book design" and with Lebedev calling for an "emphasis on the book as a complete unity" and in which "flattened, abstracted planes and geometrical shapes evoke the Suprematism of Kazimir Malevich".

Building on these success, Raduga was able to attract contributions from some of the most talented Russian writers (Agnaia Barto, Vitaly Bianki, L. I. Borisova, Korney Chukovsky, Elena Danko, Samuil Marshak, Evgeny Schwartz, and Boris Zhitkov) and artists (Y. P. Annenkov, Sergey Chekhonin, Mstislav Dobuzhinsky, Vladimir Konashevich, Eduard Krimmer, Boris Kustodiev, Vladimir Lebedev, Alexei Radakov, Sergeii Rakhmanin, Konstantin Rudakov, Mikhail Tsekhanovskii, and V. S. Tvardovskii) of the time. By 1926 Raduga was able to publish a catalogue of 216 titles.

Raduga's first years had coincided with the New Economic Policy era in the Soviet Union, a relatively liberal time for art and literature. However, from about 1925 Raduga was attacked by a number of "proletarian literary critics", such as Anna Grinberg who claimed that the elegant designs in Raduga books willfully ignored the circumstances in which children were being raised and did not provide enough relevant and even comprehensible material for children in the new Soviet society for whom a more scientific method was appropriate. A similar attack was made by Lenin's wife Nadezhda Krupskaya.

On top of this official disapproval, the firm was experiencing increased financial difficulties and restricted access to printing presses which as a private company it was not permitted to own. Its authors and artists were less willing to work for the maverick Raduga and antagonize the Soviet cultural authorities and, when they were not always paid on time, they began to drift away to Russia's state publishing house Gosizdat, taking some of Raduga's "most valuable literary properties with them".

The quality and innovation of Raduga's publications began to decline. In 1927, the Committee of Children's Literature prohibited Raduga from reprinting 81% of its backlist, claiming those books were "contaminated by harmful bourgeois ideology". Increasing competition was experienced from the government-approved publishing houses. In 1934 it was decreed that socialist realism was the only acceptable artistic method for Soviet literature and art.

Raduga ceased operations in 1930. During its short existence it had published around 400 titles. Its books had become known in Western countries when they were displayed shown in exhibitions in Amsterdam (1929), New York and Cambridge.

From 1973 a new company named Raduga Publishers, with its head office in Moscow, began publishing books, including the series "Russian Classics" and "Adventure & Fantasy". During the Cold War years, many books in English and in Indian languages, including Raduga books, were exported to India and neighbouring countries and achieved a wide following there. Some Indian publishers co-published titles with Raduga and groups of Indian translators were invited to the Soviet Union where they translated books into Indian languages which were then published and sold at low prices in India.

In 2022 the Raduga website was selling video and computer games.

== Gallery ==
Front covers of some of the books published by Raduga Publishers in the years 1924-25 (click on each image to expand): Note: More images can be seen in pages linked to from "External Links" section below.

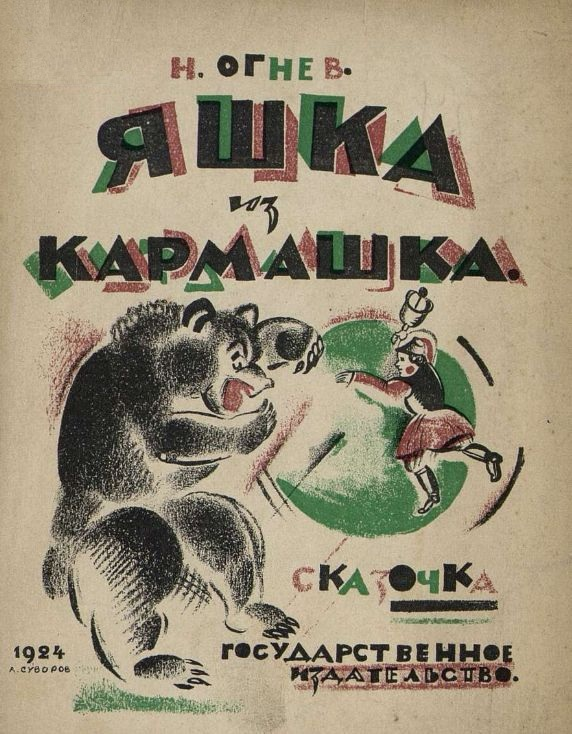
Яшка из кармашка : сказочка (English: "Yashka from a Pocket: A Fairy Tale") by N. Ognev. 1924.

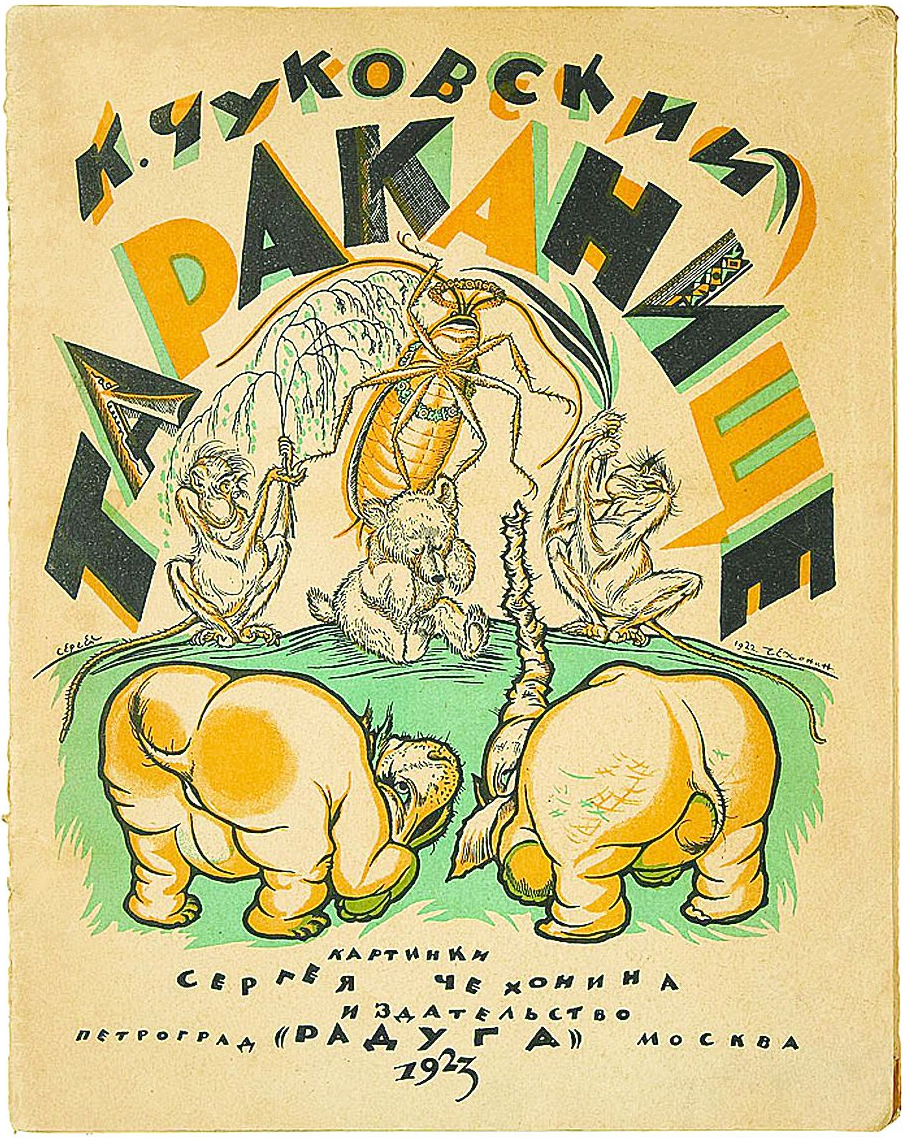
Тараканище (English: "The Monster Cockroach") by Корне́й Ива́нович Чуко́вский (Korney Chukovsky). Illustrated by Sergey Chekhonin. 1925.

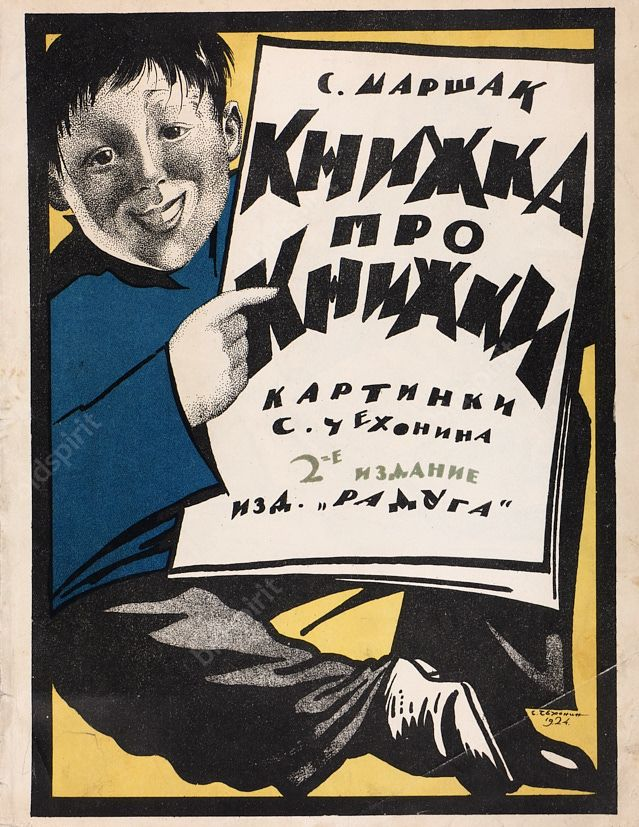
Книжка про книжки (English: "A Book About Books") by С. Маршак (Samuil Marshak). 1925.

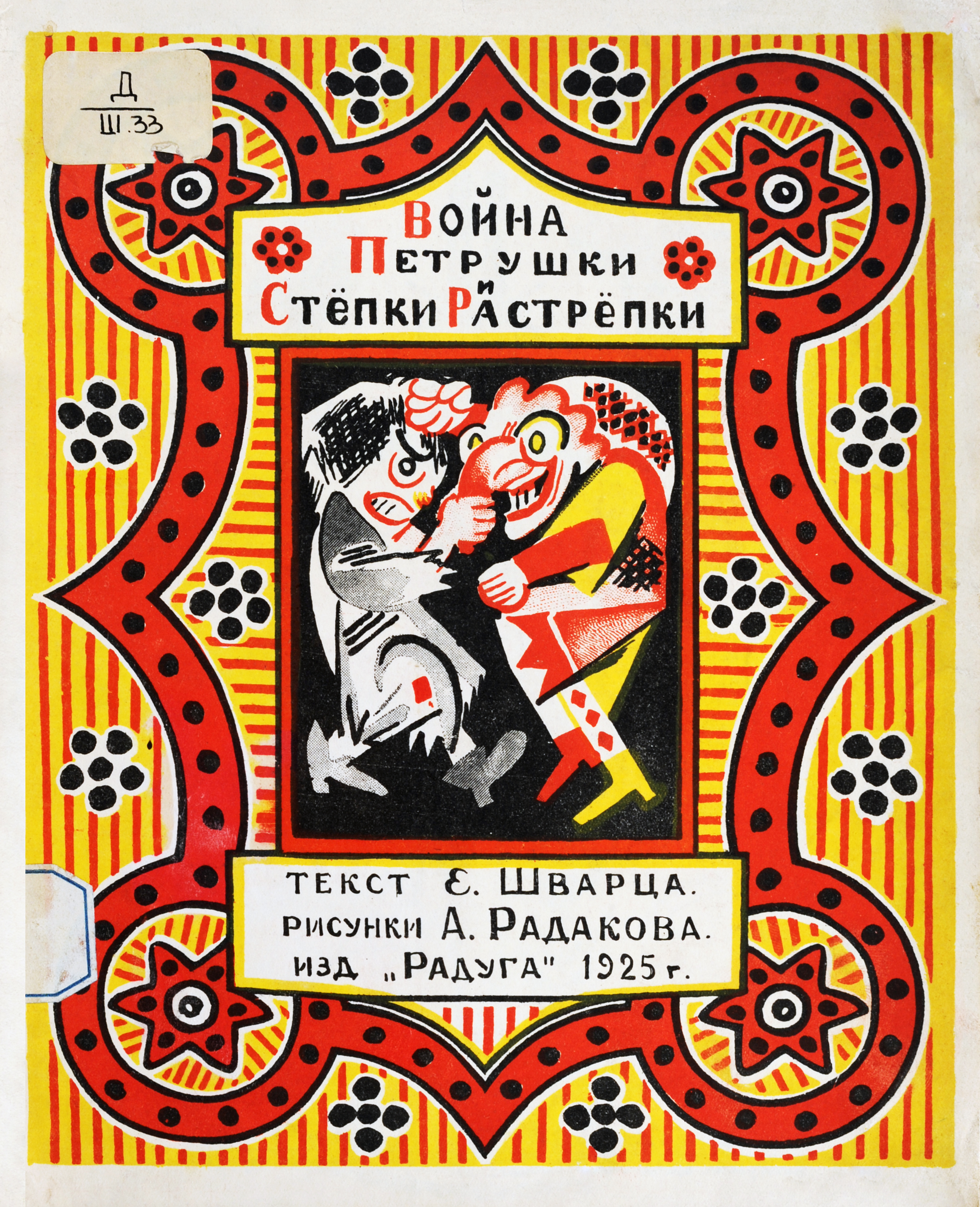
Война Петрушки и Стёпки Растрёпки (English: "War of Parsley and Stipples Ripples") by Evgeny Schwartz. 1925

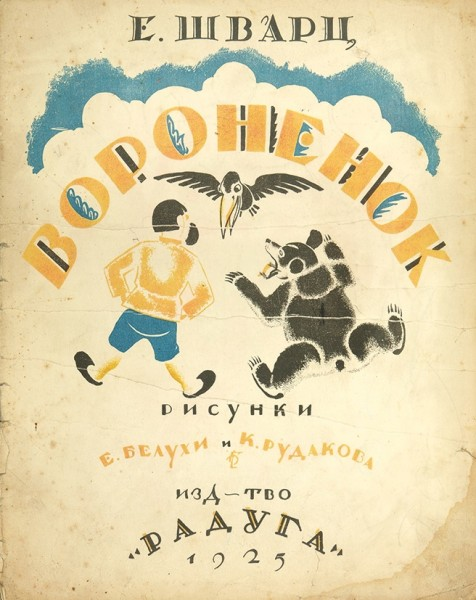
Вороненок (English: "Voronenok") by Evgeny Schwartz Illustrations by E. Belukha and Konstantin Ivanovich Rudakov. 1925.

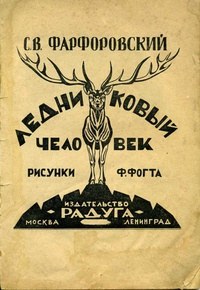
Ледниковый человек (English: "Ice Man") by С. В. Фарфоровский (= S. [Sergei] V. Farforovsky). Illustrations by Fedor Vogt. 1925.
