= Zinaida Nekrasova =

Wife of Nikolay Nekrasov (1846–1915)

- Зинаида Николаевна Некрасова
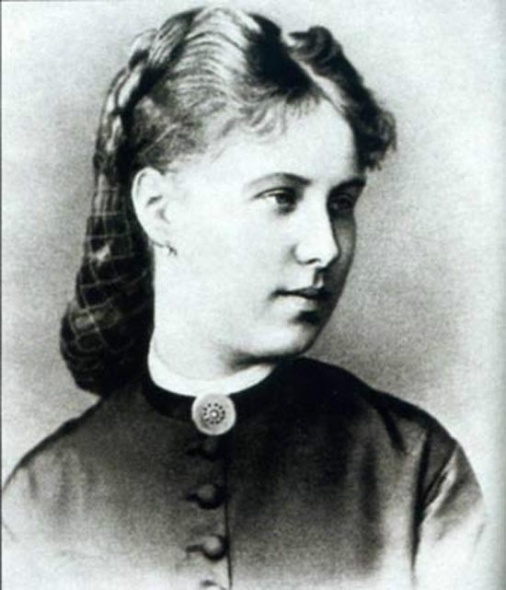
- Zinaida Nekrasova in 1870
- Born: Second half of September 1846; Vyshny Volochyok, Russian Empire
- Died: 24 January 1915; Saratov, Russian Empire
- Occupations: editor; housewife
- Spouse: Nikolay Nekrasov

Zinaida Nikolaevna Nekrasova (Russian: Зинаи́да Никола́евна Некра́сова; born Fyokla Anisimovna Viktorova; 1846 – 25 January 1915) was the colleague and wife of the Russian poet, publicist, and public figure Nikolay Alekseevich Nekrasov. Almost nothing is known about her childhood and youth. There are various versions about her birth date, origins, and the circumstances of her meeting with the poet. The young woman met him in 1870, and they immediately became close. Nekrasov did much to provide her with a proper education, introducing her to his circle of close friends and relatives. Zinaida Nikolaevna carried out some of the poet's assignments related to the editing and publication of his works.

The poet dedicated the poem Grandfather to Zinaida Nekrasova, as well as at least three poems in the book Last Songs, the publication rights of which were transferred to his wife by the author. She participated in the publication and distribution of inexpensive editions of her husband's poems.

Zinaida Nekrasova's destiny has been addressed in articles and monographs by many literary scholars, archivists, and cultural researchers. Among them are doctors of philological sciences Mikhail Makeev and Nikolay Skatov, candidate of philology Irina Abramovskaya, candidate of cultural studies Vyacheslav Lyotin, and others.

== Origins and youth ==
The Parish register, issued by the Saratov Spiritual Consistory to the Voskresenskoye Cemetery Church in the city of Saratov for recording births, marriages, and deaths for the year 1915 states that Zinaida Nekrasova's died at the age of 68. According to Zinaida's biographer Loman, this register allows to establish that she was born in 1846 (and not the beginning of the following year, since the name day of Fyokla, after whom she was named at baptism, falls in the second half of that year). Before the publication of Loman's article, Zinaida's birth year was either not mentioned or listed as 1851. However, the dating of Fyokla Viktorova's birth as 1851 appears in later publications as well. An example is the 2021 book I am full of spirit and alive…N.A. Nekrasov in the Novgorod Region. On the 200th Anniversary of the Poet's Birth by candidate of philological sciences Irina Abramovskaya and Irina Smirnova. There is another version expressed by the senior researcher of the Chudovo branch of the Novgorod Museum-Reserve Tatyana Grigoryeva, who says that Zinaida's correct birth date was on the second half of 1850; Grigoryeva referred to a surviving letter from Zinaida Safonova, who knew Z. Nekrasova well. The letter states the poet's widow's age at death as not 68 but 65 years.

Contemporaries held differing opinions regarding Fyokla Viktorova's origins:

- Nikolay Nekrasov himself, in his will, referred to her as the daughter of a "deceased private" of the imperial army;
- The poet's contemporary Ekaterina Zhukovskaya perceived Fyokla Viktorova as the daughter of a military historia;
- The Karabikha distiller P. E. Koshkin claimed that the poet and his future wife met in Saint Petersburg, but Fyokla Viktorova hailed from Vyshny Volochyok and was the daughter of an ober-officer; (Note: In Abramovskaya and Smirnova's book, she is first described as the daughter of a soldier from Vyshny Volochok. Two pages later, she is described as the daughter of an Oberoffizier from the same town.)
- The poet's friend, statesman, and amateur hunter Vasily Lazarevsky claimed in a diary, which had not yet been published by 1978 when Loman referenced it, that before meeting the poet, Viktorova was the kept woman of a certain merchant Lytkin. The monogrammist M.S., author of an article in a reference publication dedicated to the poet's inner circle, wrote regarding this version: "Lazarevsky's diary entry, which records received information without personal judgments, appears to be the most free from bias in presenting the facts".

Olga Loman collected new testimonies in the 1960s–1970s from people who knew Zinaida in Saratov, where she settled after the poet's death, but they did not clarify the already known information:

- E. F. Eremeeva claimed: "While hunting, Nekrasov visited the house of her father, Anisim Viktorov. It was in her father's house that she met the poet".
- A. G. Ozolina reported: "She came from a poor family. Her mother was a laundress. Nekrasov met her on the street, they got acquainted, and later he proposed and married her". The monogrammist M. S. argued that this version "may have been dictated by the need to clean the woman's image from what traditionally caused condemnation".
- T. I. Orlova recounted: "Z. N. was the daughter of a laundress. Nekrasov met her in Chudovo, when she was returning from the river with a basket of laundry on her head".
- The poet's niece, Vera Fyodorovna Nekrasova, told Olga Loman: "We knew nothing about Z. N., neither father nor mother told us anything. I only remember that mother said that Zin. Nik. was selling something on the street (I don't remember what; it seems, flowers), and that's where N. A. met her".
- A. I. Meshchaninova, granddaughter of Fyokla Viktorova's sister, told the researcher that the girl's parents came from Kolpino burghers.

Literary researcher Korney Chukovsky claimed that the girl was the daughter of a drummer, and that "it was said (and perhaps this was slander) that her melodious pseudonym was given to her in that establishment on Ofitserskaya Street, where the poet met her". In his 1920 diary, Chukovsky reproduced the version of Zinaida Nikolaevna's origins, which, according to him, he heard from the poet's half-sister Elizaveta Alexandrovna Fokht (Nekrasova)-Ryumling: "She was from a house of pleasure on Ofitserskaya Street. I remember that house; there was a locksmith's workshop there, and above the workshop hung a key —instead of a sign— and the locksmith's wife had 3 or 4 wards, whom guests visited — sometimes the girls went to the guests. Their place was called Under the Key. When men went there, they were saying: let's go under the key. Zina was from that place". Doctor of philological sciences Mikhail Makeev attributed the information about the girl's "shameful profession" to Lazarevsky's diary, which, in his opinion, Lazarevsky could have heard from the poet himself. At the same time, Makeev wrote that this was disinformation, as there were no traces (vulgarity, brazenness) of a "shameful profession" in the girl's appearance or behavior. The researcher himself suggested that she came from the burgher class, was an orphan, a servant of one of the poet's wealthy acquaintances, who presumably used her as a concubine and gave her or even "sold" her to Nekrasov. Doctors of historical sciences Natalia Lebina and Mikhail Shkarovsky wrote in the book Prostitution in Petersburg (1840s–1940s), that for a prostitute, the opportunity to lead an "honest life" came through marriage, while noting that marriages of men from "society" to prostitutes "rarely ended happily." Such events were infrequent: the Saint Petersburg Medical-Police Committee recorded only 4 marriages between 1901 and 1910. As earlier examples of such events, the authors of the monograph cited the marriages of Pyotr Schmidt and Nikolay Nekrasov: "In his later years, N. A. Nekrasov married the public woman Fyokla Onisimovna Viktorova from the house of pleasure known as Under the Key on Ofitserskaya Street". This version of Zinaida's origins is also mentioned in the book Nekrasov and His Circle. Reference Edition, specifying that it "was mentioned in certain specialized (Lebina, Shkarovsky) and literary studies as unproven and slanderous (Loman) or as based on information shared in private conversation".

The Nekrasova's biographer, Vladislav Evgenyev-Maksimov, published a notice in 1915 in the newspaper Den': "There is no information in the literature about Zinaida Nikolaevna's life before meeting Nekrasov or the circumstances under which they met. The author of this article… would be extremely grateful for any information on this matter". His request for help in gathering information went unanswered. Zinaida Nekrasova's passport, stored at the Institute of Russian Literature, provides no information on the issue. No correspondence between the spouses exists, as they were never apart for the rest of the poet's life. Olga Loman only speculated that Fyokla Viktorova was "of simple status, orphaned early, and did not receive a systematic education. It is unlikely that she was born in Karabikha or Chudovo: judging by Nekrasov's letters, she first visited these places with him. Nor could her homeland have been places near Greshnevo, as confirmed by the absence of legends or stories about her in Greshnevo. The old residents of Greshnevo, contemporaries of the poet, did not know her".

== Marriage with Nikolay Nekrasov ==
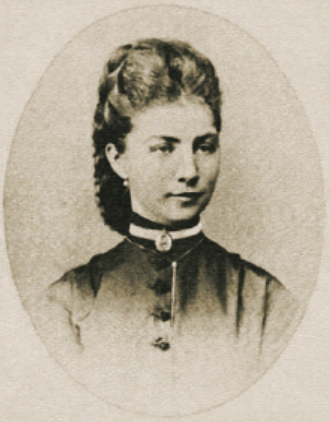
Friedrich Gunther Moebius, Zinaida Nikolayevna Nekrasova, 1870

Fyokla Anisimovna Viktorova met Nikolay Nekrasov in the spring of 1870, when she was 23-year-old (she herself claimed in her memoirs that she was only 19 years old). Olga Loman described her as "beautiful and modest, kind and warm-hearted, a cheerful singer and a laugher". At that time, the poet was already 48 years old. The literary scholar believed that Nekrasov initially did not take his relationship with the girl seriously. He settled Fyokla Viktorova in an apartment rented specifically for her (located in the city center in Povarskoy Lane), but later offered her to move into the half of his own apartment that had been vacant since the death of Ivan Panaev and the departure of his wife in 1863. The staircase on the floor ended at a landing; the door to the right led to the poet's rooms, and to the left – to Fyokla Viktorova's rooms, while the rooms were connected internally. Zinaida Nikolaevna lived in these rooms until the poet's death. The first mentions of the girl appear in Nekrasov's letters in May 1870. For example, in a letter from early May to Vasily Lazarevsky, with whom the poet planned to go hunting, Nekrasov writes that he did not make it to Chudovo because "something came up, due to which I need to stay here a few more days". Opposite this fragment, Lazarevsky made a note in the margin: "Zina" ([Zinaida Nikolaevna], as the poet was already calling Fyokla Viktorova at that time). On May 7, 1870, Lazarevsky mentioned in his diary a trip with Nekrasov to Chudovo "for the first time together with Zina".

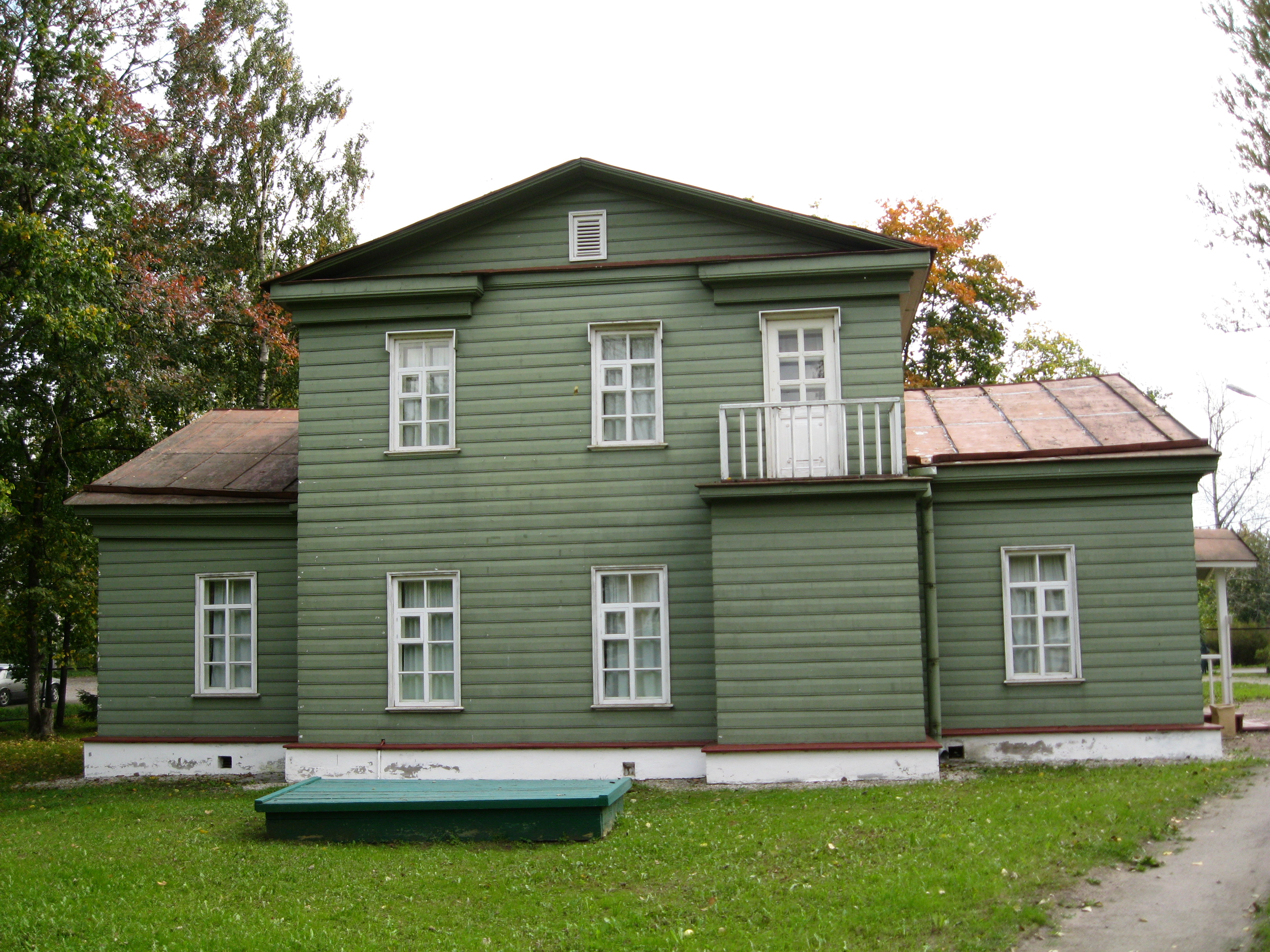
N.A. Nekrasov House-Museum in Chudovo

Fyokla Viktorova told the Saratov journalist Nikolai Arkhangelsky about the appearance of her new name and patronymic: "Nikolay Alekseevich started calling me Zina, adding his patronymic. Following him, all our acquaintances began calling me Zinaida Nikolaevna, so that in the end, I became so accustomed to it that I seem to have forgotten that my name is Fyokla Anisimovna". Some Soviet and Russian literary scholars considered the reason for the name change to be the dissonant sound of the girl's birth name and patronymic. Candidate of philological sciences Irina Abramovskaya and senior researcher at the poet's house-museum in Chudovo Irina Smirnova believed that in the name Zinaida, Nekrasov reflected meanings that corresponded both to Fyokla's character and her relationship with the poet. In translation from Greek Ζηναΐς, the name means "Belonging to Zeus", "…of the lineage of Zeus" or "divine daughter", and the patronymic, in this interpretation, points to the girl's patron — Nikolay Nekrasov himself. In translation from Arabic, the same name means "beautiful," and from Latin — "caring". According to Abramovskaya and Smirnova, these were the qualities the poet had in mind when giving the girl her new name.

Olga Loman noted that already in the first year of living together with Zinaida, the poet wrote to his relatives without separating himself from her: "we are sending," "we are leaving," "we will head to Dieppe," "come to us in Petersburg… we will be glad," "Zina and I," "We arrived in Petersburg safely… moved to the Chudovo house". At the same time, Nekrasov did not take the girl to receptions where unfamiliar people might be present. Most often, when the poet left, Zinaida stayed at home. If she accompanied Nekrasov on a trip, she waited for him in the carriage.

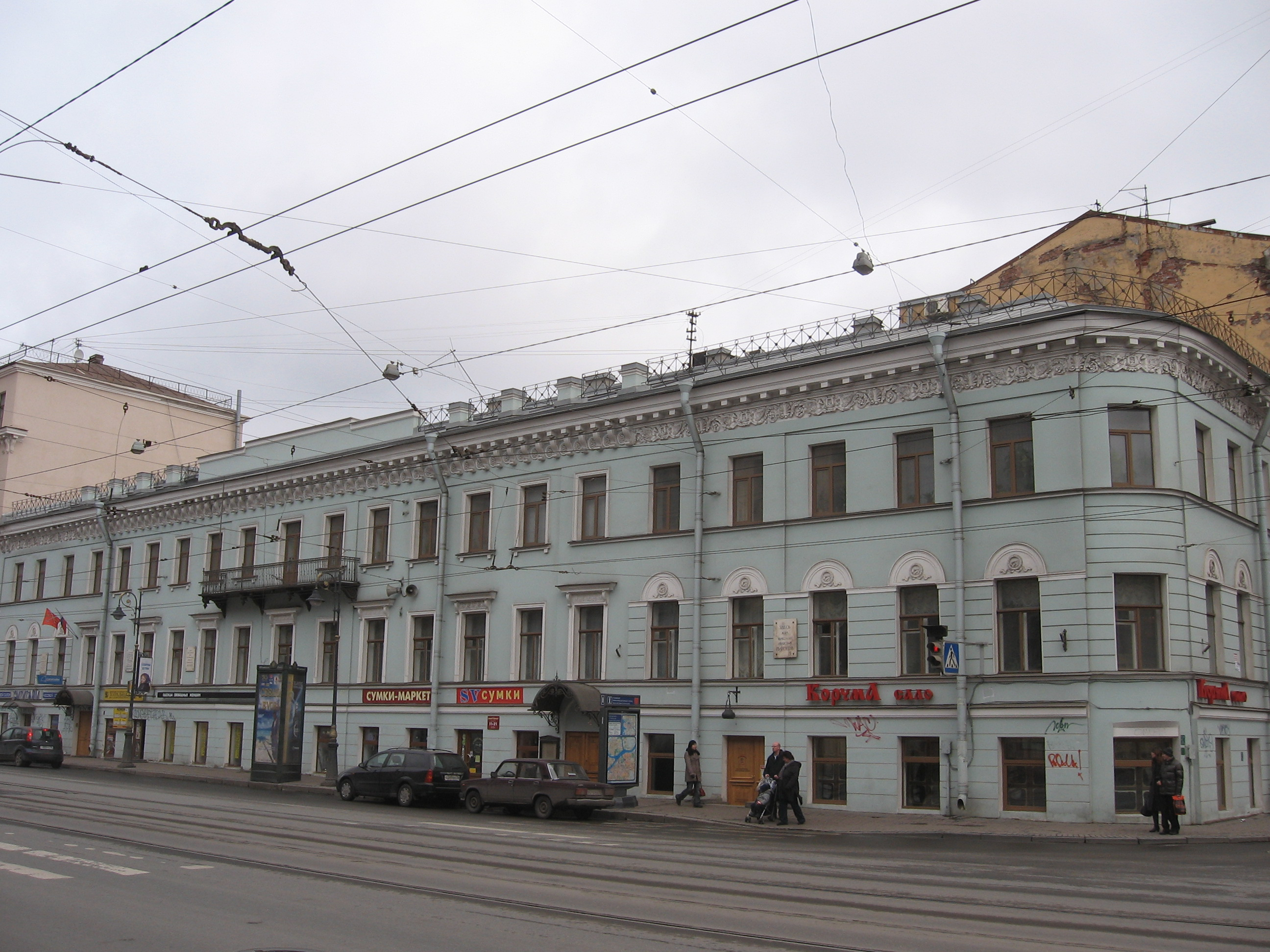
Krayevsky's house in Saint Petersburg, where Nikolay Nekrasov and Fyokla Viktorova lived

From the very beginning of their life together, the poet sought to provide his beloved with a good and comprehensive education. Informing his brother that he would not come to Karabikha alone, he asked to rent a piano in Yaroslavl. Zinaida had a nice voice and sang very well. Initially, she wrote very slowly and made numerous spelling mistakes ("I cannot convince her to write, as she is afraid of the spelling mistakes she makes", — Nekrasov claimed). After Nekrasov's death, while living in Saratov, Zinaida herself taught literacy to children and adult women. At the poet's insistence, Zinaida took French lessons, which were given to her by Maria Naksariy. She later recalled that "Z. N. studied French diligently and with great success". An opposing testimony comes from the wife of the poet's brother Fyodor, Natalia Pavlovna: "In the summer of 1873, Nikolay Alekseevich traveled abroad, was in Paris, and complained comically that foreign languages were not coming easily to Zinaida Nikolaevna and that the money spent on teachers was wasted". Mikhail Makeev argued that the girl likely lacked not so much education as development.

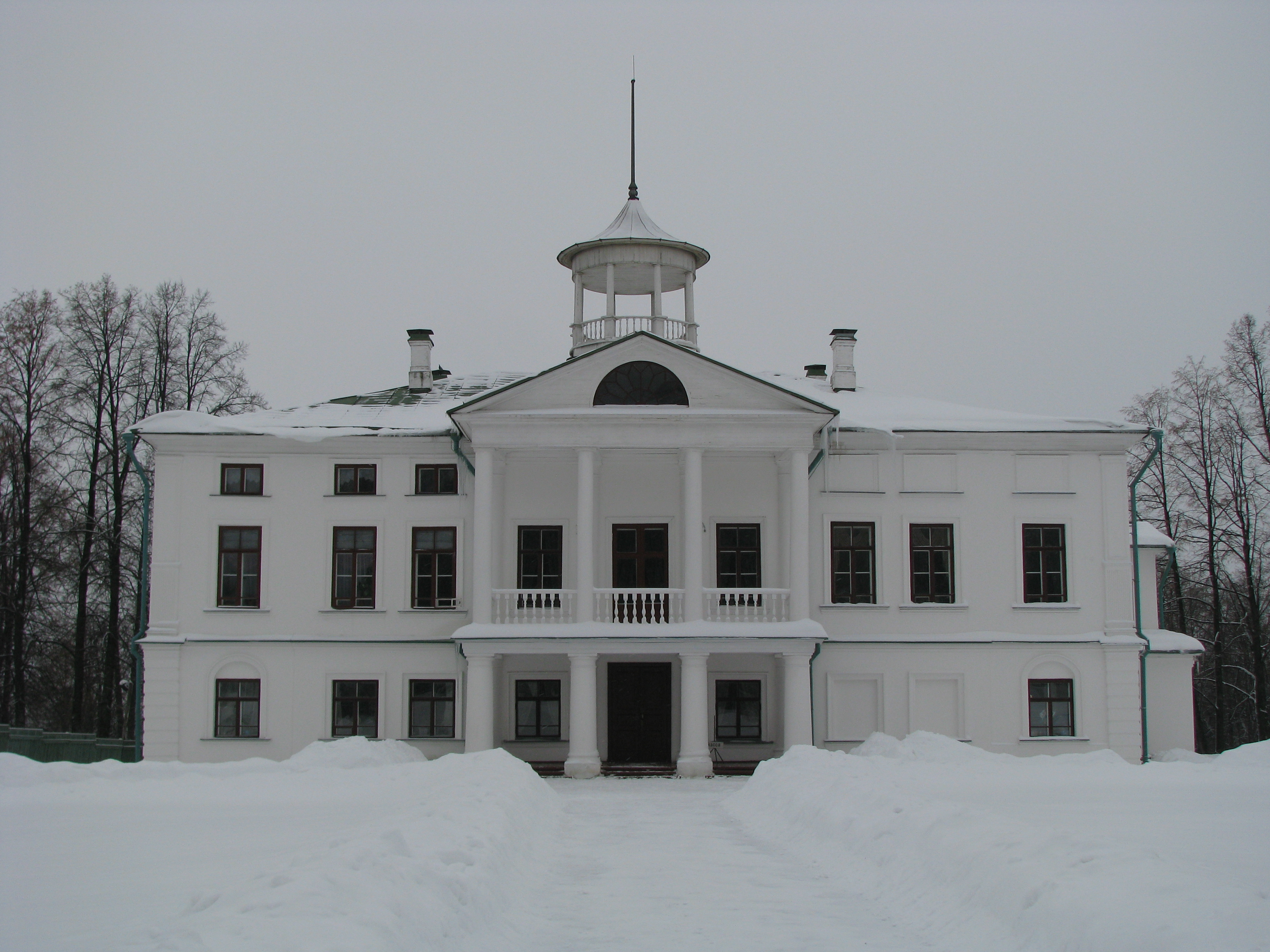
Nekrasov's house in Karabikha

However, Zinaida Nikolaevna herself, in her 1914 memoirs, presented a different version: "Nikolay Alekseevich loved me very much, spoiled me; he treated me like a doll. Dresses, theaters, joint hunting, all sorts of pleasures — that's what my life consisted of. Life was good then because I was young and carefree, but now I deeply regret that Nikolay Alekseevich did not develop me. That's the only reproach I can make to him".

Nikolay Nekrasov spent a lot of time with his future wife, telling her about himself, his work, his plans, and his childhood. At the same time, she did not always understand her husband's concerns, worries, and sorrows. Olga Loman wrote that Zinaida Nikolaevna "with feminine intuition sensed how she could ease his life". Zinaida accompanied the poet to the censorship office and waited for him to come out to calm him. The Nekrasovs together attended theater, concerts, and exhibitions, went for walks to the islands or around the city, and shopped in stores. Another version was expressed – Zinaida Nekrasova preferred to spend time at home, while Nekrasov enjoyed playing cards at the club. When the poet gave the girl a ticket to the theater or a concert for her to attend alone, Zinaida would sit for only about a quarter of an hour to justify the money spent and then leave. The next day, she could not tell Nikolay Alekseevich about her impressions, as she was not good at making things up. She explained her actions as follows: "How can I sit calmly in the theater or at a concert when all my thoughts are about you… I am most at peace alone. At least no one interferes with my thoughts about you." As a result, Nekrasov began attending such events with the girl himself. Local peasants recalled Zinaida: "She never let him get angry, and always looked after him. If he was nervous or worried, she would immediately calm him down, soothe him. She was a nice one!"

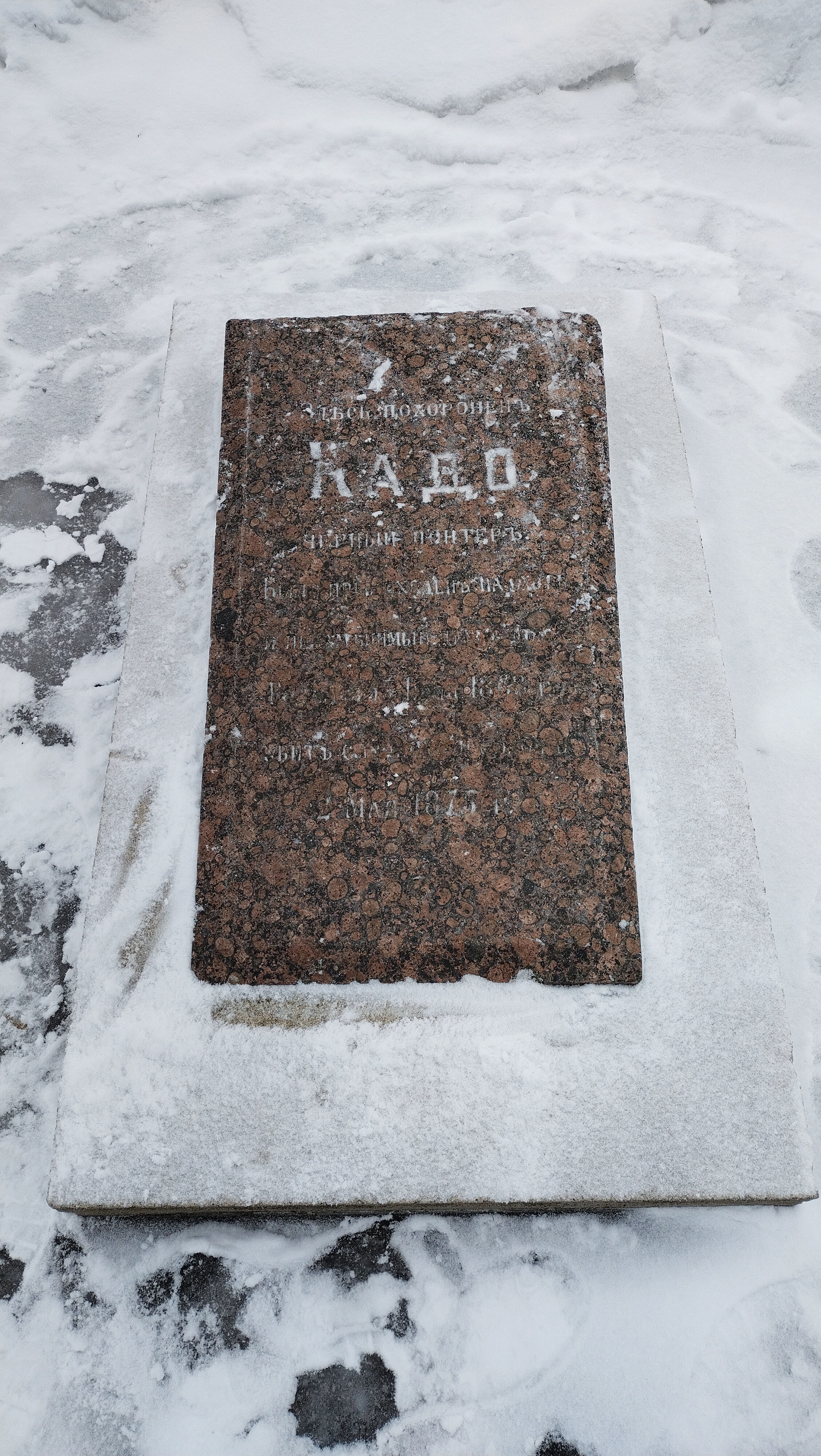
Grave of Nikolay Nekrasov's pointer Kado in Chudovo

Zinaida accompanied the poet everywhere. In 1873, Nekrasov and Zinaida Nikolaevna, together with the poet's sister Anna Alekseevna, traveled abroad: to Kissingen, Paris, and Dieppe. The companion of the poet's final years accompanied Nekrasov on all his trips across Russia – to Karabikha, Chudovskaya Luka, and Crimea. Writer and literary critic Vladimir Botsyanovsky in his 1921 essay Vlas claimed that Nekrasov was jealous of Zinaida Nikolaevna. She complained about the poet's jealousy to her French teacher, Maria Naksariy. According to Botsyanovsky, Zinaida was ready to take her own life several times. Once, she told Nekrasov that she was ready to throw herself out of a window. The poet quickly approached the window, opened it, and said, that she was welcome to do it. Botsyanovsky wrote that Nekrasov considered jealousy one of his main flaws.

External image
- Pyotr Krivorutsky. Monument to Nekrasov hunting with a dog

Zinaida assisted her husband in reading proofs: she followed the original when he edited prints, and sometimes she herself checked them against the originals if the poet was occupied with something else.

External videos
- Zinaida Nekrasova's room in Chudovskaya Luka. Excerpt from a tour of the Nikolai Nekrasov House-Museum in Chudovo, 2024

On May 2, 1875, Zinaida Nikolaevna accidentally shot Kado – Nekrasov's beloved dog. During a hunt in Chudovskaya Luka, Zinaida Nekrasova separated from the poet and headed to the swamp to shoot ducks. The dog ran after her. A shot rang out, followed by the dog's barking. Nekrasov ran toward the sound through the swamp, tearing his clothes and scratching his hands and face. Upon reaching the spot, he saw Zinaida sitting on the bank, holding the bloodied Kado on her lap. According to the account of the incident's eyewitness, hunter Mironov, the events unfolded somewhat differently: "We were at the roosts, sitting in a hut, at about two in the morning. Zinaida Nikolaevna came out of the hut, and a grouse flew out of the bushes. She fired, and Kado was sneaking right there. The dog yelped and tumbled".

Zinaida Nekrasova was inconsolable: she cried and begged her husband to forgive her. In response, according to Soviet literary scholar Vladimir Zhdanov and doctor of philological sciences Nikolay Skatov, the poet said: "What are you talking about, why are you grieving? You killed this dog accidentally, but every day somewhere in the world people are killed deliberately." In memory of his beloved dog, Nekrasov placed a granite slab near the estate house. According to literary critic Nikolay Ashukin, a dark gray marble slab was placed over the grave. After this incident, Zinaida completely stopped hunting.

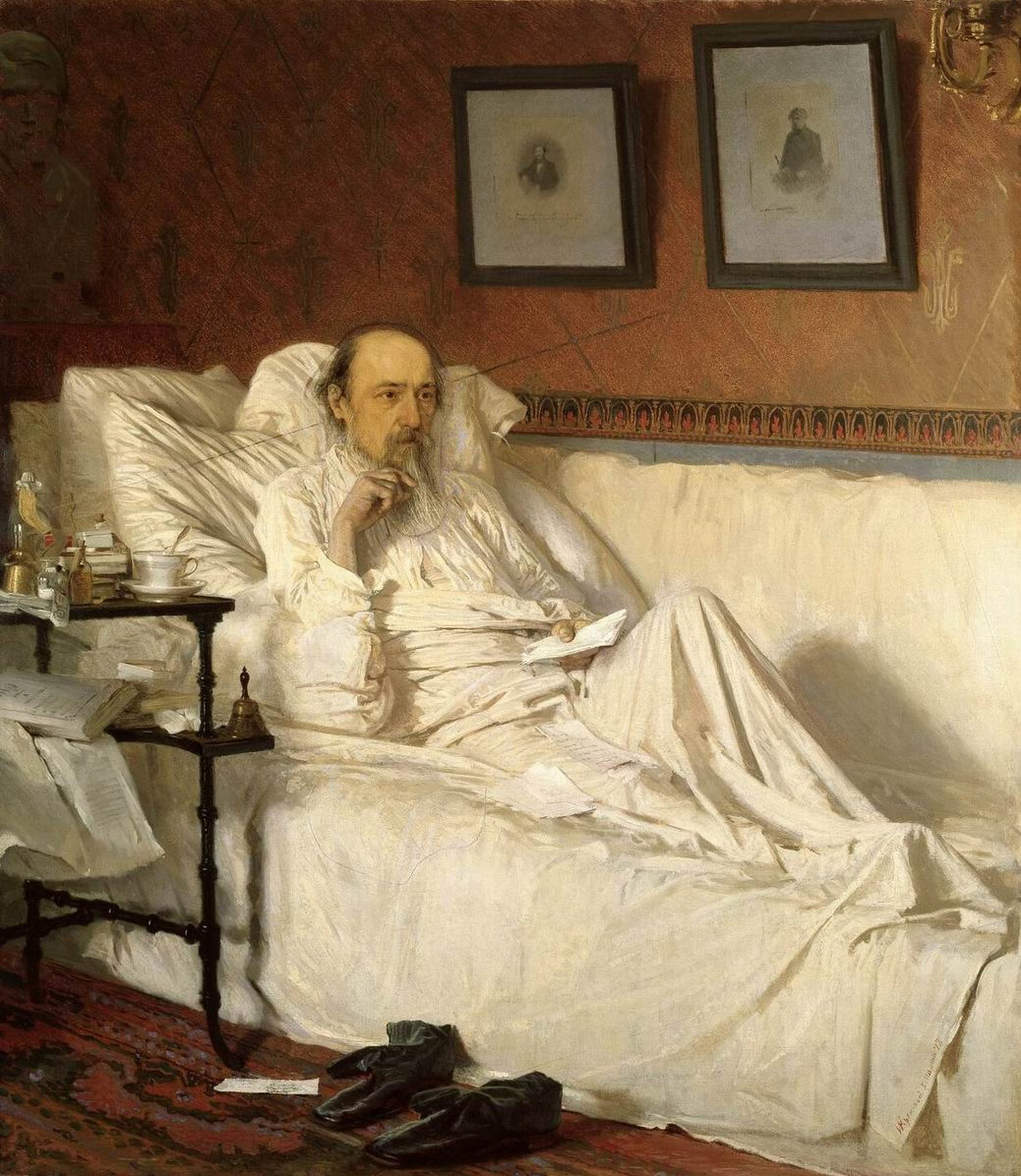
Ivan Kramskoy. N. A. Nekrasov during the Period of Last Songs, 1877–1878

Contemporaries noted the closest bond between the spouses in the poet's final years, during his severe illness. Writer Nikolay Panov recalled: Nekrasov "called Zinaida Nikolaevna, sat her beside him, and held heartfelt conversations with her. His face, stern just minutes before, transformed: his eyes shone with gentle sadness". The wife bandaged her husband. It was difficult for Zinaida to hide her worries and exhaustion, especially since the poet himself asked her: "Laugh, sing, as you sang in the spring". Later, Nekrasova recalled: "To cheer him up amid inhuman suffering, I sang cheerful songs. My soul was breaking with pity, but I held myself together, singing and singing…" She said: "I had to endure so much then that in five or six months, I became several years more serious and older".

Before his death, the poet decided to enter into a legal marriage with Zinaida (initially discussing this matter with his valet Nikanor Butylin). It is known that Zinaida tried to refuse the wedding. Olga Loman suggested that the poet's persistence was driven by the fear of leaving her without any legal rights. Nekrasov was too weak to be married in a church, and priests one after another refused to perform the wedding at home, "and didn't want to risk their position or invite trouble". According to archival documents found by Olga Loman, permission for a home marriage was never obtained, as home weddings were prohibited. Lawyer Alexei Unkovsky approached the Metropolitan of Novgorod, Saint Petersburg, and Finland, a leading member of the Holy Governing Synod Isidor. Citing church regulations and refusing a home wedding, he noted that the military clergy had field churches: "Where they set up a tent — there is their church, and any sacrament can be performed". After this, Unkovsky turned to the military clergy. A tent-church was set up. The wedding took place on April 4, 1877, in the large dining hall of the poet's apartment on Liteyny Prospekt. Supported under her arms, the wife was led three times around the analogion. Nekrasov walked barefoot, wearing only a shirt. The witnesses to the marriage were Mikhail Saltykov-Shchedrin and engineer Alexander Erakov. The reference edition Chronicle of the Life and Work of N.A. Nekrasov in 3 Volumes, published in 2009, also names a third witness – E.A. Romanovsky.

The priest of the Saint Petersburg Admiralty Saint Spyridon of Trimythous Cathedral, Mikhail Vasilyevich Kutnevich, performed the wedding ceremony at his own risk, for which he received 500 rubles. For this, he was disciplined by the Holy Governing Synod. A church investigation into other marriages performed by Kutnevich was launched. As a result, he was stripped of his priestly rank, and in 1885, he was entirely excluded from the clergy. However, the Nekrasovs' marriage, after a lengthy review of the circumstances of its performance and questioning of witnesses, was recognized as legal.

On December 27, 1877, at 8:50 pm, Nekrasov died. His wife was by his side until the last moment. Memoirist Pavel Kovalevsky described the care of the poet's sister and wife for the dying poet: "They competed in self-torment: each refused to sleep to hear his first groan and be the first to rush to his bedside. For this, Zinochka, who was younger and struggled more with sleep, would sit on the floor and stare at a lit candle… she turned from a young, fair, and rosy-cheeked woman into an old woman with a yellow face, and remained so".

Later, Nekrasova recounted: "When he died, I was like a madwoman…" A testimony, passed down orally for a long time (recorded only in 1949), survives about her presence at her husband's funeral: "Zinaida Nikolaevna held herself very steadfastly and courageously throughout. But when the coffin was carried out of the apartment, she felt faint, and I [Nekrasov's hunting friend, Privy Councillor Nikolay Vasilyevich Kholchevnikov] supported her, or she would have fallen. But she recovered and followed the coffin. I led her by the arm. I wanted to seat her in a carriage (there were many), but she refused and walked the entire way on foot with the crowd behind her husband's coffin." On the same day, Zinaida Nikolaevna purchased a plot at the Voskresenskoye Novodevichy Cemetery next to her husband's grave. The receipt for the purchase is stored in the archive of the Pushkin House. There are testimonies that after the poet's death, Zinaida Nikolaevna intended to enter a monastery.

== Zinaida Nekrasova after the poet's death ==
According to the will (at that time, Zinaida Nikolaevna officially held the status of housekeeper), Nekrasov divided his property among relatives and close ones (Note: Rumors circulated that Zinaida Nekrasova allegedly forced her husband to rewrite the already written will in her favor, but these are unsubstantiated. The poet's will was never rewritten or changed.). To his wife, he bequeathed ownership of everything in his Petersburg apartment, except for the rifles, which were bequeathed to his brother, Konstantin Nekrasov. Zinaida Nekrasova also received the "Luka" estate near Chudovo, but she was to transfer half of it to Konstantin Nekrasov. The part of the Luka estate bequeathed to her, Zinaida Nekrasova sold to the poet's sister Anna (according to Nikolay Skatov, she transferred it to Konstantin Nekrasov free of charge). On February 23, 1878, Nekrasova formally renounced her rights as Nekrasov's wife to the estate of Anna Birar (the poet's mother's sister), who died at that time, in Kherson Governorate, valued at 60000 rubles.

Immediately after the poet's death, his relatives stopped considering Zinaida Nikolaevna: the Nekrasov brothers sold a significant portion of the property from the Petersburg apartment at an auction, some items were moved to Karabikha, the manuscripts bequeathed to the widow were handled by the poet's sister, who also removed the dedication to Zinaida Nikolaevna in the poem "Grandfather" in a new publication and did not provide commentary on the poems addressed to Nekrasova in the cycle Last Songs. Fyodor Nekrasov refused to allow Zinaida Nikolaevna into the Karabikha estate. The poet's widow lacked the means to maintain the apartment in Saint Petersburg, and she was forced to terminate the lease agreement. The money received from the sale of the property, Zinaida Nikolaevna deposited in a bank and lived off the interest. Olga Loman suggested that the widow initially planned to settle in Petersburg and changed "several apartments or rooms" there. At that time, Zinaida Nikolaevna's sister and her daughter also lived in Petersburg.

For some time, Zinaida Nikolaevna lived in Crimea and Ukraine — in Kiev and Odessa. There, she witnessed Jewish pogroms. Testimonies survive that she fearlessly protected Jewish children from pogromists. When a crowd approached the house where she and several Jewish families lived, Zinaida Nikolaevna locked the gates and confronted the mob. Standing at the open wicket gate, she shouted: "Where are you going? Come to your senses! I live here, I, the widow of the poet Nekrasov". The crowd dispersed.

External image
- House in Saratov where Zinaida Nekrasova died in January 1915. Photograph from 1961

From the south, the poet's widow returned to Saint Petersburg but did not maintain contact with her husband's old acquaintances. Many of them were convinced (including the publicist and ideologue of Narodnikism Nikolay Mikhailovsky, actor and art critic Modest Pisarev, and the Nekrasovs' coachman Fyodor) that she had already died. Historian Vasily Bilbasov concluded that the poet's widow had died based on the fact that the once well-kept grave of Nikolay Alekseevich had fallen into neglect for five years. Her surviving passport indicates that, while living at various addresses in the capital, the poet's widow made trips during this time to Sevastopol, Kiev, and Staraya Russa.

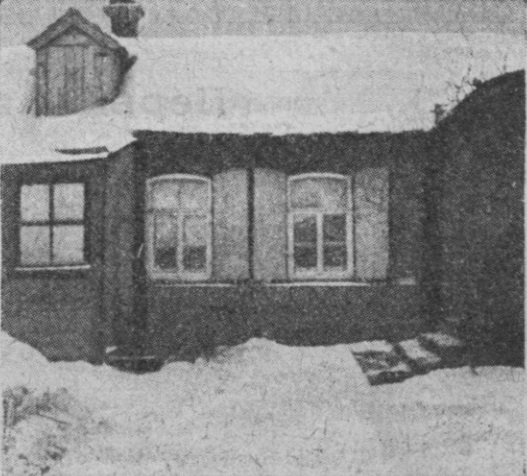
Zinaida Nekrasova's house in Saratov in January 1913

From 1898, Zinaida Nikolaevna settled in Saratov and lived there for 17 years, only occasionally leaving to visit her relatives or her husband's grave. She lived modestly "in a wooden house, in a small, clean, and cozy room," helping the poor whenever possible. While living in Kiev, the poet's widow had joined a Baptist community. Her association with the Baptists continued in Saratov. A Saratov journalist, hiding behind the initials "V. D-v," published a short note in January 1913 in the newspaper Saratovsky List. He decided to visit the poet's widow, but the address bureau could not provide any information. He then went to the prayer house of the Baptists on Groshevaya Street, which Nekrasova regularly attended. It turned out that she was ill and rarely left her home. One of the Baptists escorted the journalist to her house. Communication with Nekrasova herself proved impossible. A Baptist preacher, Grigory Semyonovich, who was on duty at the house, allowed D-v first into the yard of the "shack" where Nekrasova lived (from where only "old knitted curtains" in the widow's room window and flowers behind them could be seen), and then into her vestibule, and promised to convey to the widow the journalist's desire to talk with her and "photograph her little room". From the vestibule, the journalist heard the poet's widow trying to get out of bed, but the preacher, coming out to the vestibule, reported that Nekrasova refused personal communication with D-v due to her heart and leg ailments. A photograph of the elderly Zinaida Nekrasova was published alongside the note.

Local Baptists extorted money from the poet's widow, and when Zinaida Nikolaevna found herself in extreme financial hardship and asked for the return of the money taken from her, they excommunicated her from the community and banned her from attending the prayer house. When a scandal erupted over this, the Baptists approached Zinaida Nikolaevna with a request for reconciliation, but they did not return the money. One of the Baptists, engaged in pork trading, who had taken the last three thousand rubles from Nekrasova, offered the poet's widow a place behind the counter of his sausage shop as compensation. The monogrammist M.S. reports that for some time, Zinaida Nikolaevna indeed worked at Kirillov's sausage shop on Nemetskaya Street.

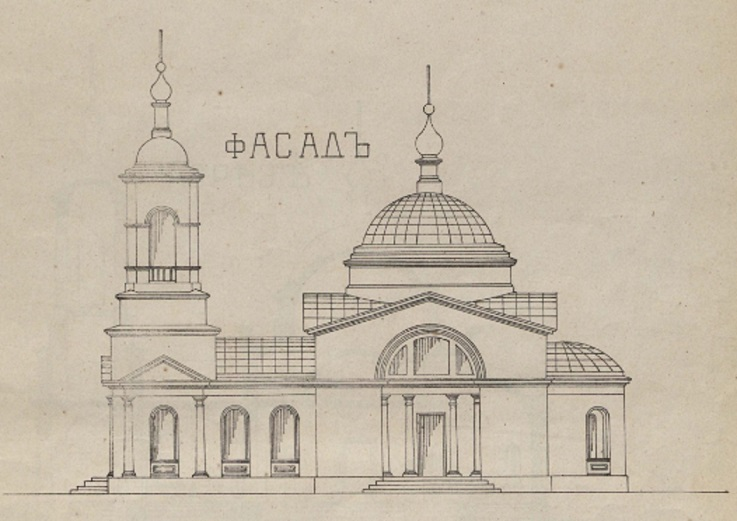
Mikhail Grudistov. Voskresenskaya Cemetery Church in Saratov, 1877

The newspaper Saratovsky Vestnik and the Literary Fund began collecting money for Zinaida Nekrasova, with contributions coming from private individuals, but for a long time, the poet's widow refused to accept the money, viewing it as charity. Moreover, she had become distrustful of people. In one of the few interviews from this period, Nekrasova spoke about herself: "Like a snail, I withdrew into my shell and live quietly… I hardly see anyone… God be with them, with people. I had to endure so much from them. Oh, there are cruel, cruel people. So much time has passed, but the wound in my soul does not heal…" The only form of receiving the collected funds that she agreed to was a monthly pension from the Literary Fund in the amount of 50 rubles.

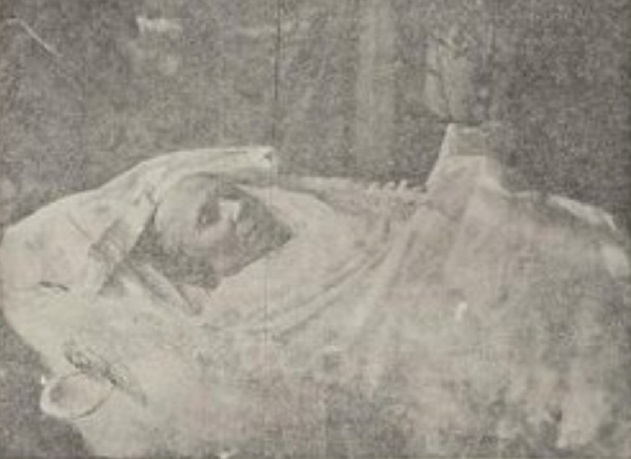
Zinaida Nekrasova in her coffin, January 25, 1915

The people of Saratov remembered Zinaida Nekrasova's selfless help to needy families, her love for children, flowers, animals, and birds. She often went to the city slums and gave children mittens, socks, scarves, and books with Nekrasov's poems that she had knitted herself, and treated them to sweets. Zinaida Nekrasova read to children, taught them literacy, sang children's songs with them, and told them about her husband. "She had a clear mind and a pure, deeply believing soul… I was drawn to her precisely by this crystal-clear soul and a kind of special integrity that spoke of great moral strength," said the editor of Saratovsky Vestnik Nikolay Arkhangelsky.

At the end of 1914, rheumatism, diagnosed by doctors in Zinaida, caused complications to her heart. The Parish register, issued by the Saratov Spiritual Consistory to the Voskresenskoye Cemetery Church in the city of Saratov for recording births, marriages, and deaths for the year 1915", lists the cause of her death as myocarditis. Possibly, a cold she caught while feeding birds in the frost played a role. The illness took an "acute and painful" form. During her illness, Nekrasova often recalled her husband and recited his poems by heart. Zinaida Nikolaevna bequeathed to be buried according to the rites of the Orthodox Church and died at her home at Malaya Tsaritsynskaya, house 70 (the State Catalogue of the Ministry of Culture of the Russian Federation lists a different house number – 60), in Ozolina's apartment, at 4:30 a.m. on January 25, 1915. At the funeral (January 27), only a few friends, neighbors, and employees of Saratov newspapers were present. The funeral service took place at the Voskresenskaya Cemetery Church. Priest Sergiy Troitsky, in accordance with the deceased's wishes, repeatedly proclaimed "for the repose of the newly departed Fyokla," but, according to those present, added barely audibly: "also known as Zinaida". In a special supplement to the newspaper Saratovsky Vestnik dedicated to Zinaida Nikolaevna on the occasion of her death, a photograph of her in her coffin was published. Nekrasova was buried at the Voskresenskoye Cemetery in Saratov.

== Zinaida Nekrasova's appearance ==
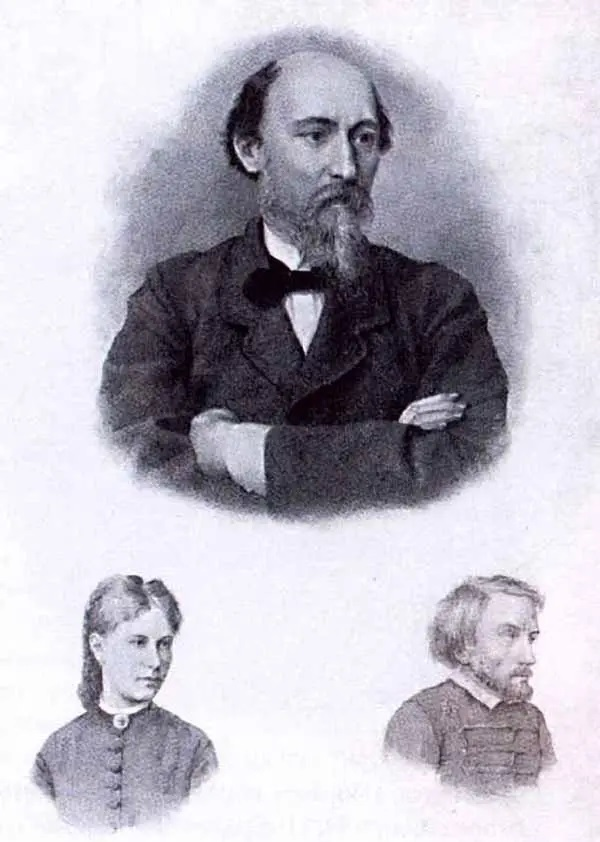
Ivan Pozhalostin. Portraits of N. A. Nekrasov, V. G. Belinsky, and Z. N. Nekrasova (engraving), 1878

In the reference publication Nikolay Alekseevich Nekrasov. Bibliographic Index of Literature, a photograph of Zinaida Nikolaevna is mentioned, taken by the well-known Moscow photographer Friedrich Günther Möbius in the 1870s. A preserved photographic portrait of Zinaida, created in the studio of the photographer of His Imperial Highness Grand Duke Nikolay Nikolaevich the Elder, a member of Karl Bergamasco, has also survived. It depicts "a charming, modestly dressed young woman with fluffy hair gathered in a hairnet, with a soft oval face and kind eyes". On May 30, 1872, the Nekrasov couple gifted this portrait to Alexander Pleshcheev— the son of their friend, the poet Aleksei Pleshcheev —along with a paired portrait of the poet himself. This was attested by Pleshcheev the Younger: "Zinaida, Zinaida Nikolaevna, also gave me her portrait on the same day. They had just been photographed by Bergamasco". According to contemporaries, Nikolay Nekrasov cherished this portrait of his wife. Zinaida Nikolaevna later allowed it to be rephotographed but forbade its publication in print until after her death. In April 1878, the Russian engraver, creator of an entire gallery of images of Russian cultural figures of his time, Ivan Pozhalostin, made a "remark" in the lower margin of one of the prints of an engraving of Nekrasov based on a portrait by the realist artist Ivan Kramskoi. There, Pozhalostin also included a portrait of the art critic and publicist Vissarion Belinsky. The Saratov photographer Sergei Grishnyakov rephotographed Karl Bergamasco's photograph for an oval frame in the 1870s.

The poet's coachman described Zinaida Nikolaevna's appearance as follows: "She was a hunter too… She'd put on this riding habit, tight trousers like leggings of hussars, tucking her hair under the hat – you couldn't tell she was a woman. Nikolay Alekseevich was passionately fond of her in this outfit". The hunter Mironov described Zinaida similarly: "Zinaida was always with him… She'd arrive from St. Petersburg as a lady, but for hunting, she'd go as a gentleman: she'd put on trousers, a jacket, and boots. She was cheerful, beautiful. Sometimes, if Mikolai Lekseich got angry about something, she'd embrace him, kiss him, and cheer him up, oh how she'd cheer him up".

Kornei Chukovsky, based on the accounts of the poet's relatives, provided the following description of Zinaida Nekrasova: "Zina was rosy, slender, and most resembled a pampered, pretty, well-fed maid from a wealthy noble household". She was a blonde with dimples on her cheeks, loved words like "muzzle" and "cutie," and the Gostiny Dvor was for her the greatest source of joy. Elizaveta Nekrasova-Ryumling described Zinaida Nekrasova as follows: "In her appearance, she was not attractive: a fair blonde with small gray eyes and almost white eyelashes. Her face was very long and extremely cold".

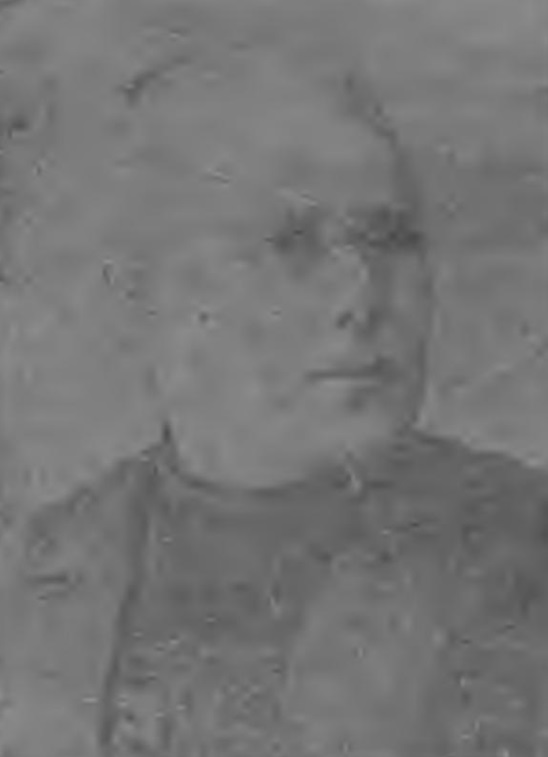
Zinaida Nekrasova in 1913

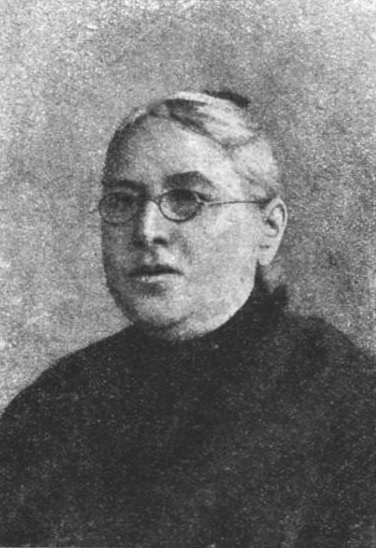
Photographic portrait of Zinaida Nekrasova from the magazine Niva, 191

Two photographs of Zinaida Nekrasova were published in print in the early 20th century. One appeared in the newspaper Saratovsky Listok in January 1913, and the second in the magazine Niva in May 1918. At the time of Zinaida's death, among her belongings was a certain portrait labeled "Z. N-na". It was taken by the owners of the apartment where she lived, the Ozolins. Nothing more is known about it.

Alexander Pleshcheev left a verbal portrait of Zinaida Nekrasova: "Zinaida Nikolaevna, in my opinion, was a beauty, captivating with both her gentle gaze and her always welcoming smile. Her hair was light, her profile remarkably regular, Roman, I would say. The soul of the kindest Russian woman was felt in her from the first acquaintance". Nekrasov's nephew, Alexander Fyodorovich, recalled Zinaida: "I clearly remember Zinaida Nikolaevna, this blue-eyed blonde with a charming complexion, beautifully shaped mouth, and pearly teeth. She was gracefully built, agile, resourceful, a good shot, and rode horseback, so sometimes N. A. took her hunting with him". A French language teacher recalled Zinaida: "very charming, simple, like a modiste, but an intelligent woman".

Accounts of Zinaida Nikolaevna's appearance during her time in Saratov are contradictory. Some contemporaries wrote of her: "Stately, rosy, with beautiful gray hair, with lively blue eyes". Saratov resident Ivan Sokolov provided the following description after interacting with the poet's widow: "She was animated, talked a lot, and laughed. She seemed to me talkative, kind, and cheerful". Antonina Arkhangelskaya wrote: "To me, a young girl, she always made a pleasant impression: tall, beautiful, modest, and welcoming. By then, she was already elderly and often unwell". However, art critic Pavel Kovalevsky claimed that after Nekrasov's death, his widow "turned into an old woman with a yellow face and remained so". Nekrasova herself began noting changes in her appearance while caring for her dying husband. She wrote that for two years, she had to go without proper sleep, walked as if in a dream, and began to "swell". In Saratov, Zinaida Nikolaevna was seen only in mourning, but she bequeathed to be buried in all white.

== Historiography ==
Memoirs of Zinaida Nekrasova herself were collected by Vladislav Evgenyev-Maximov in 1914 and published in a retold form in issue No. 2 of the monthly illustrated popular science and literary New Journal for All, issued in St. Petersburg in 1915, and later republished with commentary in the collection N. A. Nekrasov in the Memoirs of Contemporaries, published in 1971. In the Nekrasov Collection of 1983, these memoirs were supplemented with fragments in which Evgenyev-Maximov himself recounts his attempts to establish contact with the poet's widow. For instance, he writes that he initially tried to arrange a meeting with Zinaida Nikolaevna through the authoritative figure in her eyes, the leader of the All-Russian Union of Evangelical Christians Ivan Prokhanov, but at that time, the widow refused the literary scholar. The first meeting, which took place some time later, was brief. Zinaida Nikolaevna only requested to review Evgenyev-Maximov's book about Nekrasov. During the second meeting, the poet's widow shared stories about her husband and even promised to later dictate her memoirs, but she was unable to fulfill this promise. Six months later, she died.

In 1927, the memoirs of Alexander Pleshcheev were published, including episodes dedicated to Zinaida. In 1971, they were also included in the collection N. A. Nekrasov in the Memoirs of Contemporaries. Among other similar memoirs is an unpublished manuscript by the editor of the Saratovsky Vestnik, Nikolay Arkhangelsky, titled Z. N. Nekrasova (Based on Personal Memoirs), stored in the N. A. Nekrasov Apartment Museum. Memoirs about Zinaida were also left by jurist and public figure Anatoly Koni, memoirist Pavel Kovalevsky, and some other less prominent contemporaries.

Soviet literary scholar Kornei Chukovsky published the article The Poet's Companions in the illustrated historical almanac The Bygone Days in 1928, in which he gave a sharply negative characterization of Zinaida Nekrasova. However, he noted that this assessment was entirely based on conversations with the poet's sister and could be subjective. According to Chukovsky, the accounts of other contemporaries were no less biased. For example, publicist Maksim Antonovych, who worked with Nekrasov at Sovremennik in the mid-1860s, "during Nekrasov's meetings with Zina, took binoculars and peered into the poet's window, watching him embrace her, and later shamelessly shared his observations in literary circles".

Researcher of the poet's work and co-chair of the Nekrasov Committee of the Union of Soviet Writers Nikolay Nekrasov published an article titled The Fate of Zinaida Nekrasova in the popular science magazine Nauka i Zhizn in December 1971, providing a brief overview of Zinaida Nekrasova's biography. In particular, he discussed the Nekrasovs' wedding and the circumstances of Zinaida Nikolaevna's life in Saratov. The researcher elaborated on Zinaida Nekrasova in greater detail in chapters titled "Help Me Work, Zina!" in the books Following Their Tracks, Along Their Roads (1979) and Sow the Rational…(1989). In another book, Nekrasov's Places in Russia, the author details only two events in the life of Zinaida: the accidental killing of Nekrasov's beloved dog Kado and her care for the dying Nekrasov during his final illness.

The goals of Olga Loman's article Nekrasova Zinaida Nikolaevna, Wife and Friend of the Great Poet N. A. Nekrasov in the Nekrasov Collection of 1978 were to systematize already published sources and introduce some new materials from archives in Moscow, Leningrad, and Saratov into scholarly circulation. Loman identified the main shortcoming of previously published works on Zinaida as inaccuracies stemming from researchers' insufficient knowledge and reliance on the same printed sources, which were "taken as truth once and for all". Among the new sources were conversations recorded by Loman herself in 1961 with people who knew Zinaida Nikolaevna closely in Saratov. In 2021, the article was republished in the collection of Olga Loman's works Nekrasov in Our Time. Olga Loman also authored the article Zinaida Nekrasova in Saratov (1988) in the magazine Volga. This article includes some facts absent from her other works. For example, Loman recounts that the upcoming screening of a film about Russian writers at the Saratov cinema The Life Mirror unexpectedly excited the poet's widow. She exclaimed to her landlady: "Let's go meet Nikolay Alekseevich!" Zinaida Nikolaevna and the landlady's entire family went to the cinema, but the film disappointed Nekrasova. She sadly remarked: "Not like him at all!"

In 2017, candidate of cultural studies Vyacheslav Lyotin published the article "Z. N. Nekrasova — cultural myth in the context of the poet's life-creation: semantics of the name." In the article, he called Zinaida Nekrasova one of the most "unread" figures of Russian culture in the second half of the 19th century. Her life outside her marriage to the poet, according to Lyotin, is mythologized, particularly before her acquaintance with Nekrasov more so than during her widowhood. Her relationship with her husband is perceived by researchers as a variation of the archetypal plot of Pygmalion and Galatea. Educational, excursion, and "populist" practices, from the researcher's perspective, exploit what seems to researchers an exhausted love story about an aging genius who met a simple girl and found a second youth with her. In his article, Lyotin focused only on the issue of the poet's choice of name for his beloved. He linked the name Zinaida to the interest Nekrasov had in the reign of Emperor Nicholas I, particularly in the works of Alexander Pushkin and the Decembrist uprising. The poet's attention was drawn to Evpraksiya Nikolaevna Vrevskaya (Wulf) — Pushkin's neighbor at his estate and friend, known in close circles as Zizi (under this name, she is mentioned, for instance, in the verse novel Eugene Onegin). According to Lyotin, the name Zinaida, in connection with Vrevskaya, was associated in Nekrasov's mind more with a child than with an object of "tender passion." A certain feminine attractiveness in such a "child" combines with purity of soul and naturalness.

Another figure undoubtedly associated by Nekrasov with this name, according to the researcher, was the hostess of a literary salon Zinaida Alexandrovna Volkonskaya. The poet likely considered her most important traits to be independence and aristocratic opposition to the emperor, as well as her close connection to artistic creation. Volkonskaya's service to art, in the poet's view, became a spiritual feat. In snowy Moscow, she appeared as a source of spiritual light, opposing not only physical but also social cold. However, Lyotin also named among the Zinaidas significant to the poet in choosing a name for Fyokla Viktorova, related to the Nicholas era, a contemporary of Nekrasov—socialite Zinaida Ivanovna Yusupova, who, by circumstance, was Nekrasov's neighbor on Liteyny Prospekt. According to Lyotin, she symbolized physical beauty and spiritual aristocracy for the poet.

Three Zinaidas who inspired Nekrasov's name choice for Fyokla Viktorova

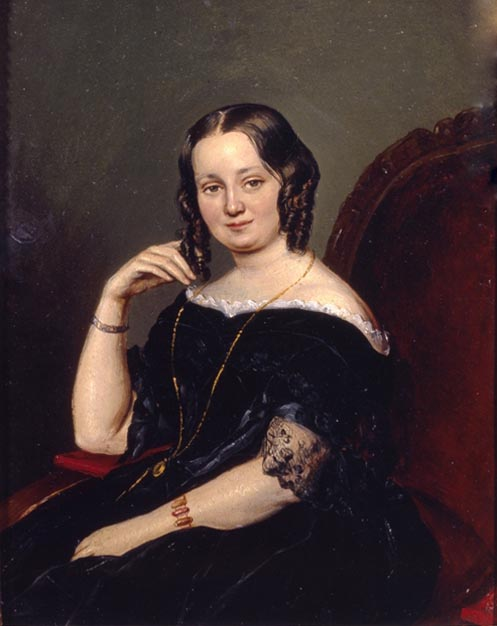
Unknown artist. Evpraksiya Wulf

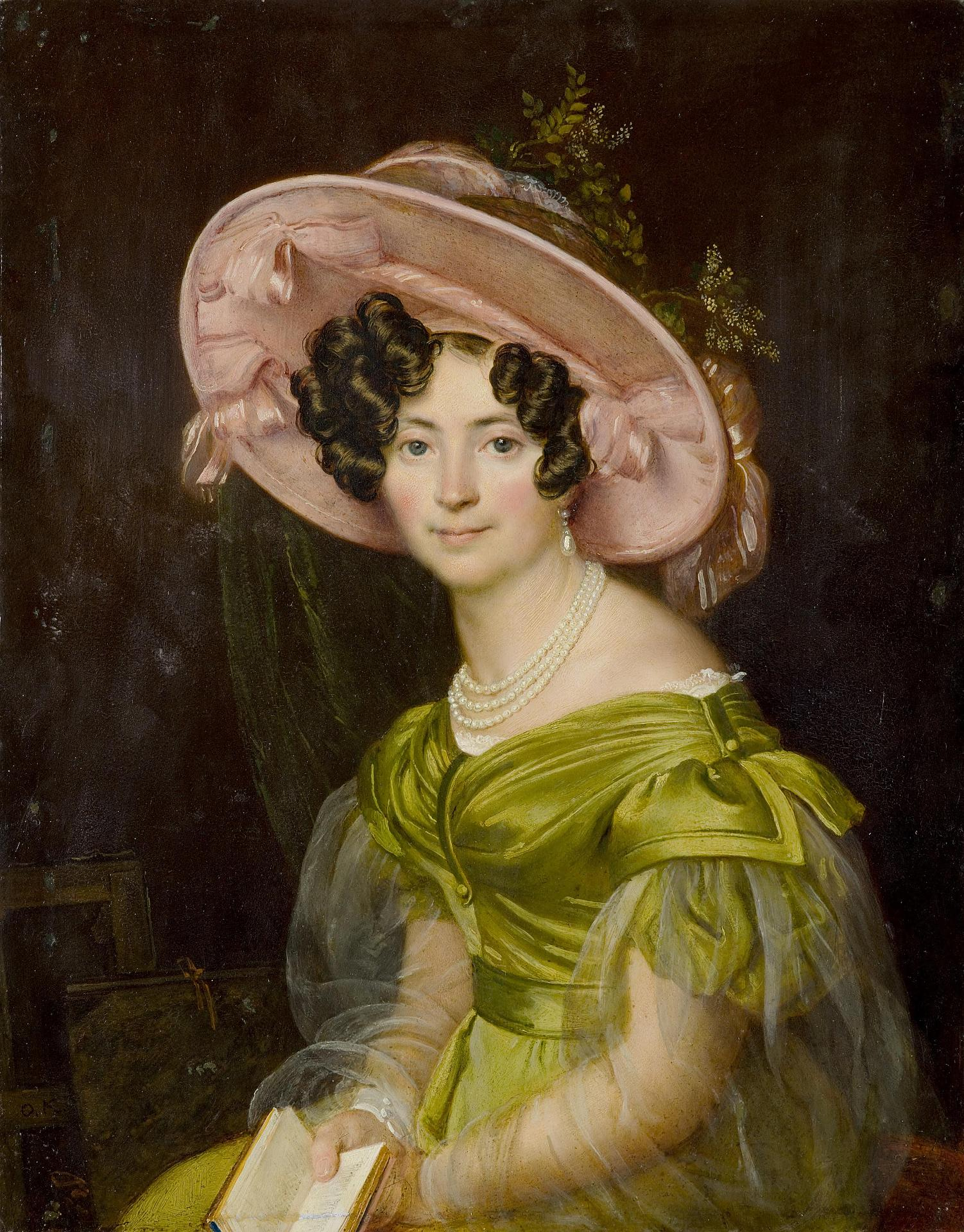
Orest Kiprensky. Portrait of Z. A. Volkonskaya, 1830

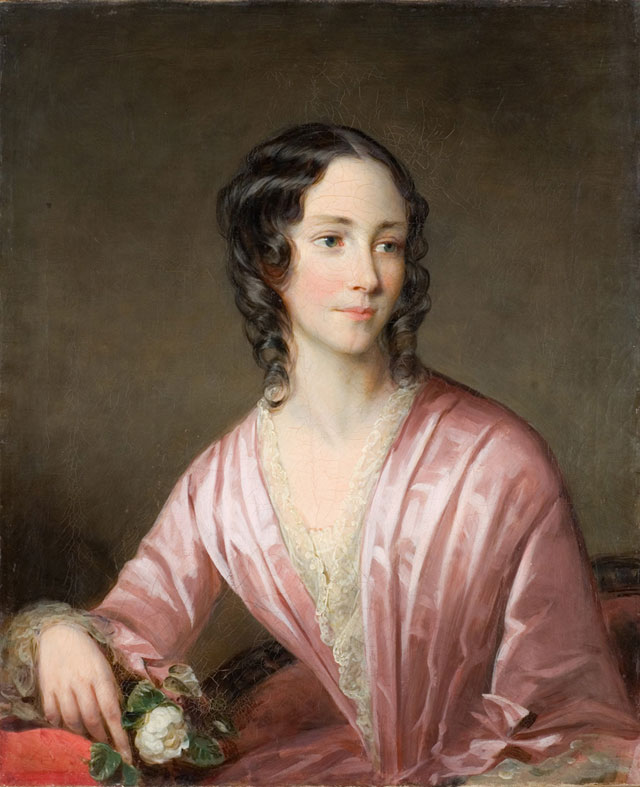
Christina Robertson. Zinaida Yusupova, 1840s

Senior researcher at the Chudovo branch of the Novgorod Museum-Reserve Tatyana Grigorieva published an article in 2018 titled F. A. Nekrasova: Known and Unknown Pages of Life in the popular science local history journal Chudovo Local History, Candidate of Philological Sciences Irina Abramovskaya and senior researcher at the Chudovo branch of the Novgorod Museum-Reserve Irina Smirnova, in the book Hunter and Poet: the Life and Work of N. A. Nekrasov in Chudovskaya Luka, published in 2021, included a detailed account of Zinaida Nekrasova's stay at the poet's house in Chudovo, her relationships with Nikolay Nekrasov, and his relatives.

Fairly detailed accounts of Zinaida Nekrasova are found in Russian monographs that include the poet's biography and an overview of his work: by Soviet and Russian literary scholar Vladimir Zhdanov, Doctors of Philological Sciences Nikolay Skatov, and Mikhail Makeev.

== Legacy ==
External image
- Grave of Zinaida Nekrasova in 2019

In 1961, during a trip to Saratov to collect testimonies about Zinaida, Olga Loman managed to locate Zinaida Nekrasova's neglected grave. With the assistance of the cemetery administration, a mound was created, and a metal plaque with an inscription was installed. In 1965, marking the fiftieth anniversary of Zinaida Nekrasova's death, the grave was enclosed with a fence, and a monument featuring a portrait and the inscription "Zinaida Nikolaevna Nekrasova, wife and friend of the great Russian poet" was ceremoniously unveiled. The situation was clarified in an article about Zinaida by the poet's grandnephew, Nikolay Nekrasov: the collection of materials about Zinaida Nekrasova was undertaken by Saratov artist Boris Protoklitov. In March 1965, at the Voskresenskoye Cemetery, near the grave of Nikolay Chernyshevsky, he discovered a mound with a "metal plaque bearing a stenciled inscription". At that time, there was neither a monument nor a fence at the grave. Thanks to the efforts of Protoklitov and his friends, a monument with the inscription noted by Loman was erected.

In the Nikolay Nekrasov House-Museum in Chudovo, the interior of Zinaida Nikolaevna's room has been restored. Visitors can see a sofa, a dresser with a mirror, tabletop kerosene lamps, a table, an armchair, chairs, a sewing table, and a carved wooden chest for clothing. The memory of Zinaida is also preserved in the N. A. Nekrasov Apartment Museum in St. Petersburg. In the bedroom where she cared for her dying husband, a photographic portrait of Zinaida Nikolaevna, cherished by her husband, hangs on the wall, and on the table lies an autograph of a poem dedicated to her.

Soviet writer Valentin Pikul dedicated a novella titled Zina – Daughter of the Drummer to Zinaida Nekrasova, included in the collection Historical Miniatures. Drawing on Pozhalostin's engraving and a photograph of Zinaida Nekrasova lying in her coffin, Pikul reflects on the role of women in Nekrasov's life, the hatred of his relatives toward Zinaida Nikolaevna, the poet's love for his wife, her tender care for her dying husband, the circumstances of the Nekrasovs' marriage, and the events of Zinaida Nikolaevna's life after her husband's death. Soviet children's writer Ninel Maksimenko dedicated a story titled Bajushki-baju. 1877 to the care provided by Zinaida Nikolaevna and Anna Butkevich for the dying poet, included in the collection Holidays and Weekdays of the Poet Nikolay Nekrasov. Member of the Union of Writers of Russia Elena Oboymina authored an essay titled The Fire of Selfless Love. Zinaida Nekrasova" in the collection Poets and Their Muses (2009).

In 1998, in the combined issue 1–2 of the illustrated almanac of the All-Russian Society for the Protection of Historical and Cultural Monuments Monuments of the Fatherland, Saratov local historian Gennady Mishin published an article titled Dear and Only Friend, dedicated to Zinaida Nekrasova. The idea of searching for facts about Zinaida's life in a provincial city was suggested to the author decades before the article's publication by Soviet poet and publisher Alexander Tvardovsky shortly before his death. The article mentions the fact that Zinaida published inexpensive pamphlets with Nikolay Nekrasov's works in Saratov in 1913–1914. The author of the article claimed that due to Nekrasova's hermitic lifestyle in Saratov, many city residents mistook her for an impostor, merely claiming closeness to the poet. Mishin wrote that in 1911, Nekrasova was visited by Kornei Chukovsky, who was then gathering material for the poet's biography, but Zinaida Nikolaevna received him "coldly, spoke little, and very generally". Nevertheless, she showed Chukovsky several documents and draft sketches of some of her husband's poems. The author of the article described the circumstances of several meetings between the poet's widow and Evgenyev-Maximov, noting that her bedside book in her final years was a Bible "in a leather embossed binding with copper clasps". Another carefully treasured book in Nekrasova's home was an edition of Last Songs with a dedication: "To my dear and only friend Zina. February 12, 1874". Earlier, in 1990, Mishin published a more complete version of this essay in his book The Interweaving of Events and Fates, published in Saratov. In particular, he recounts a chance encounter between the poet's widow and Leo Tolstoy and his daughter Tatyana Lvovna on a train. The writer asked her about her late husband, but the conversation ended in a heated dispute about religion.

Gennady Mishin believed that Zinaida Nekrasova's birth date should be clarified based on the church calendar. In Orthodox families, newborns were typically named according to the saints' calendar. The name day of Fyokla falls on September 24. This name was given to girls born on that day, or a week earlier or later. Accordingly, Zinaida Nekrasova could well have been born in the second half of September 1846.

Several times, the fate of Zinaida Nekrasova attracted the attention of print and electronic tabloids: in 2010, the newspaper Moskovsky Komsomolets published an article titled The Eyes of the Wife Are Sternly Tender. Nekrasov's Widow Lived in Saratov for 20 Years, and the online publication Express Gazeta featured an article titled Noblewoman-Peasant: What the Young Wife of Nikolay Nekrasov Had to Endure.

== See also ==
- Nikolay Nekrasov
- Grandfather

== Bibliography ==
=== Poet's contemporaries texts ===
- Bibikov, V. I. (1892). Воспоминания о Н. А. Некрасове. Исторический вестник: Журнал [Memories of N. A. Nekrasov] (in Russian). Петроград: Издательство А. С. Суворина. pp. 638–645.
- V. D-v. (1913). О Зин. Ник. Некрасовой [On Z. N. Nekrasova] (in Russian). Саратов: Газета.
- Воспоминания кучера Некрасова // Н. А. Некрасов в воспоминаниях современников [Nekrasov's coachman memories // N. A. Nekrasov in the memories of contemporariesMemories of N. A. Nekrasov] (in Russian). М.: Художественная литература. 1971. pp. 437–443.
- Yevgeniev-Maksimov, V. E. (1983). Из прошлого. Записки некрасоведа (продолжение) // Некрасовский сборник [From the past. Notes of a Nekrasovologist (continued) // Nekrasov Collection] (in Russian). Vol. VIII. Л.: Наука. Ленинградское отделение. pp. 177–207.
- Mironov, I. V. (1902). Воспоминания о Некрасове. Санкт-Петербургские ведомости: Газета.
- Nekrasova-Ryumling, Z. N. (1971). Н. А. Некрасов в воспоминаниях современников [N. A. Nekrasov in his contemporaries' memoirs] (in Russian). М.: Художественная литература. pp. 453–455, 396–402, 418–421.
- Памяти З. Н. Некрасовой. Приложение к № 25 "Саратовского вестника" [N. A. To the Memory of Z. N. Nekrasova. Appendix to No. 25 of "Saratovskiy Vestnik"] (in Russian). 1915. pp. 1–4.
- Plescheev, A. A. (1971). Мои встречи с Н. А. Некрасовым / Из записной книжки // Н. А. Некрасов в воспоминаниях современников [My meetings with N. A. Nekrasov / From a notebook // N. A. Nekrasov in the memories of contemporaries] (in Russian). М.: Художественная литература. pp. 377–381.

=== Reseaches and non-fiction ===
- Abramovskaya, I. S; Smirnova, I. V. (2021). "Охотник и поэт": жизнь и творчество Н. А. Некрасова в Чудовской Луке // "Я духом бодр и жив…". Н. А. Некрасов в Новгородском крае. К 200-летию со дня рождения поэта ["Hunter and poet": the life and work of N. A. Nekrasov in Chudovskaya Luka // "I am vigorous and alive in spirit...". N. A. Nekrasov in the Novgorod region. To the 200th anniversary of the poet's birth] (in Russian). М.: Проспект. pp. 13–44. ISBN 978-5-3923-5746-8.
- Ashukin, N. S. (1927). Некрасов и охота // Красная нива: Журнал [Nekrasov and hunting // Krasnaya Niva: Journal] (in Russian). Л.: Известия.
- Botsyanovsky, V. (1921). "Влас" // Некрасов: памятка ко дню столетия рождения [Vlas // Nekrasov: a note to the day of the centenary of his birth] (in Russian). Петроград: Государственное издательство. pp. 21–22.
- Grigoryeva, T. G. (2018). Ф. А. Некрасова: известные и неизвестные страницы жизни // Чудовский краевед: Научно-популярный журнал [F. A. Nekrasov: known and unknown pages of life // Chudovsky local historian: Popular science magazine] (in Russian). Великий Новгород: Виконт. pp. 100–107.
- Yevgeniev-Maksimov, V. E. (1918). Русская интеллигенция в изображении Н. А. Некрасова [Russian intelligentsia as portrayed by N. A. Nekrasov] (in Russian). Петроград: Товарищество издательского и печатного дела А. Ф. Маркс. pp. 324–328.
- Yevgeniev-Maksimov, V. E. (1951). Поэтическое завещание Н. А. Некрасова // Некрасовский сборник [Poetic testament of N. A. Nekrasov // Nekrasov Collection] (in Russian). Vol. I. Л.: Наука. Ленинградское отделение. pp. 32–50.
- Yevgenyev-Maksimov, V. E. (1956). Невышедшая книга о Н. А. Некрасове // Некрасовский сборник [Unreleased book about N. A. Nekrasov // Nekrasov Collection] (in Russian). Vol. II. М.—Л.: Издательство Академии наук СССР. pp. 481–500.
- Zhdanov, V. V. (1971). "XV. Последние песни". Некрасов [Nekrasov]. Жизнь замечательных людей (in Russian). М.: Молодая гвардия. pp. 461–486.
- Lebina, N. B.; Shkarovsky, M. V. (1994). Свобода и реабилитация // Проституция в Петербурге (40-е гг. XIX в. — 40-е гг. XX в.) [Freedom and Rehabilitation // Prostitution in St. Petersburg (40-ies of the XIX century - 40-ies of the XX century] (in Russian). М.: Прогресс-Академия. p. 219. ISBN 5-85864-018-4.
- Lyotin, V. A. (2017). З. Н. Некрасова — культурный миф в контексте жизнетворчества поэта: семантика имени // "Разумное, доброе, вечное…": проблемы производства, сохранения и распределения культуры в России от некрасовской эпохи до современности (усадьба, литература, музей) [Z. N. Nekrasova - cultural myth in the context of the poet's life work: semantics of the name // "Reasonable, Good, Eternal...": problems of production, preservation and distribution of culture in Russia from the Nekrasov era to the present (estate, literature, museum)] (in Russian). Ярославль: Академия 76. pp. 54–57. ISBN 978-5-9060-4044-2.
- Loman, O. V. (1978). Некрасова Зинаида Николаевна, жена и друг великого поэта Н. А. Некрасова // Некрасовский сборник [Nekrasova Zinaida Nikolaevna, wife and friend of the great poet N. A. Nekrasov // Nekrasov Collection] (in Russian). Vol. VI. Л.: Наука. Ленинградское отделение. pp. 60–84. ISSN 0132-7291.
- Loman, O. V. (2021). Некрасова Зинаида Николаевна, жена и друг великого поэта Н. А. Некрасова // Некрасов в наши дни. Великая Россия. М.: Мой учебник. pp. 247–289. ISBN 978-5-9873-6076-7.
- Loman, O. V. (1988). Зинаида Некрасова в Саратове // Волга: Журнал [Zinaida Nekrasova in Saratov // Volga: Journal] (in Russian). Саратов: Союз писателей РСФСР. pp. 158–165. ISSN 1993-9477.
- Makeev, M. S. (2017). В плену у прошлого / предварительные итоги / Болезнь и смерть // Николай Некрасов [Captured by the past / preliminary results / Illness and death // Nikolai Nekrasov]. Жизнь замечательных людей (in Russian). М.: Молодая гвардия. pp. 389–453. ISBN 978-5-9873-6076-7.
- M. S. (2021). Некрасова, Зинаида Николаевна // Некрасов и его окружение. Справочное издание [Nekrasova, Zinaida Nikolaevna // Nekrasov and his environment. Reference edition] (PDF) (in Russian). М.: Институт русской литературы. pp. 269–277.
- Nekrasov, N. K. (1979). "Part 1. Chapter V. «Помогай же мне трудиться, Зина»". По их следам, по их дорогам [Following their footsteps, following their paths] (in Russian). М.: Советская России. pp. 101–144.
- Nekrasov, N. K. (1989). "Помогай же мне трудиться, Зина" // Сейте разумное… ["Help me to do my job, Zina" // Sow Reasonable....] (in Russian). М.: Советская России. pp. 96–134.
- Nekrasov, N. K. (1971). Случай на охоте / Доктор // Некрасовские места в России [An incident on the hunt / Doctor // Nekrasov's places in Russia] (in Russian). Ярославль: Верхне-Волжское издательство. pp. 152–158 / 159–164.
- Rozanov, I. N. (1924). Н. А. Некрасов. Жизнь и судьба [N. A. Nekrasov. Life and Destiny] (in Russian). Петроград: Колос. p. 112.
- Skatov, N. N. (2004). Фёкла Анисимовна Викторова, она же Зинаида Николаевна Некрасова / …И, только труп его увидя... [Fyokla Anisimovna Viktorova, aka Zinaida Nikolaevna Nekrasova / ...And, only seeing his corpse...]. Жизнь замечательных людей (in Russian). М.: Молодая гвардия. pp. 405–415 / 416–423. ISBN 5-2350-2704-3.
- Teplinsky, M. V. (1956). Творческая история поэмы Некрасова "Современники" // Некрасовский сборник [Creative History of Nekrasov's Poem "Contemporaries" // Nekrasov Collection] (in Russian). Vol. II. М.—Л.: Издательство Академии наук СССР. pp. 297–344.
- Tyurin, V. V. (1982). Новая жизнь дома Некрасова // Некрасов в Чудово [New life of Nekrasov's house // Nekrasov in Chudovo] (in Russian). Л.: Лениздат. pp. 75–84.
- Chukovsky, K. I. (1991). 1920 // Дневник (1901—1929) [1920 // Diary (1901-1929)] (in Russian). М.: Советский писатель. pp. 135–151. ISBN 5-265-01523-X.
- Chukovsky, K. I. (1928). Подруги поэта // Минувшие дни: Журнал, приложение к вечернему выпуску "Красной газеты" [The poet's friends // Minus days: Magazine, supplement to the evening issue of Krasnaya Gazeta] (in Russian). Vol. II. Л.: Центральный, губернский, городской комитеты ВКП(б) и Петросовета. pp. 10–29.

=== Reference books, encyclopedias and guides ===
- Melgunov, B. V. (2009). Летопись жизни и деятельности Н. А. Некрасова в 3 томах [Chronicle of the life and work of N. A. Nekrasov in 3 volumes] (in Russian). Vol. 3 (1867—1877). СПб.: Наука. p. 705. ISBN 978-5-0202-5211-0.
- Loman, O. V. (1970). Музей-квартира Н. А. Некрасова [Museum-apartment of N. A. Nekrasov] (in Russian). Л.: Лениздат.
- Николай Алексеевич Некрасов. Библиографический указатель литературы [Nikolai Alexeyevich Nekrasov. Bibliographic index.] (in Russian). Vol. 2. Part 1. Articles (1983—2000). М.: ЦУНБ им. Н. А. Некрасова. 2016. p. 76.

=== Journalism and fiction ===
- Maksimenko, N. I. (1973). Горе старой Орины // Праздники и будни поэта Николая Некрасова [Sorrow of old Orina // Holidays and everyday life of poet Nikolai Nekrasov] (in Russian). М.: Детская литература. pp. 138–146.
- Mishin, G. A. (1990). Милый и единственный друг // Событий и судеб сплетенье [Sweet and only friend // Events and fates are intertwined] (in Russian). Саратов: Приволжское книжное издательство. pp. 132–154. ISBN 5-7633-0305-9.
- Mishin, G. A. (1998). Милый и единственный друг // Памятники Отечества: Альманах [My dear and only friend // Monuments of the Fatherland: Almanac] (PDF) (in Russian). М.: Всероссийское общество охраны памятников истории и культуры. pp. 156–160.
- Oboymina, E. N. (2009). Огонь бескорыстной любви. Зинаида Некрасова // Поэты и их музы [Fire of selfless love. Zinaida Nekrasova // Poets and their muses] (in Russian). М.: АСТ Пресс. pp. 229–235. ISBN 978-5-4620-0944-0.
- Pikul, V. S. (1994). Зина — дочь барабанщика // Исторические миниатюры: Сборник рассказов [Zina - the Drummer's Daughter // Historical Miniatures: A Collection of Stories] (in Russian). Рига: Импакт. pp. 340–350. ISBN 978-5-2350-4000-7.

=== Mass media ===
- Gansky, V. (2010). "Глаза жены сурово-нежны". Вдова Некрасова 20 лет прожила в Саратове ["The wife's eyes are sternly tender". Nekrasov's widow lived in Saratov for 20 years] (in Russian). Саратов: Газета. ISSN 1562-1987.

=== Pedagogical and methodological sources ===
- Fefilova, G. E. (2016). "Lesson 62". Литература. 10 класс. Планы-конспекты для 105 уроков. Учебно-методическое пособие. Средняя и старшая школы. Лучшие методики обучения (in Russian). М.: АСТ. pp. 269–271. ISBN 978-5-1709-9225-6.
- Yakushin, N. I. (2003). "Поэзия Некрасова в 1870-е годы. «Последние песни»". Н. А. Некрасов в жизни и творчестве: учебное пособие для школ, гимназий, лицеев и колледжей [N. A. Nekrasov in life and work: textbook for schools, gymnasiums, lyceums and colleges]. В помощь школе (in Russian). М.: Русское слово. pp. 37–43. ISBN 5-9485-3103-1.
