= Fiance (disambiguation) =

A fiancé is a man who is engaged.

Fiance or fiancee may also refer to:

== Film and television ==
- The Fiancee (film), a 1980 East German film
- Fiancee (TV series), a 2013 Chinese TV series
- The Fiances, a 1963 Italian film

== Music ==
- Fiancé (Ed Tullett album), 2016
- The Fiancée (album), a 2007 album from the Christian metalcore band The Chariot
- "Fiance", a song by Cat Power from her 1996 album Myra Lee

== Literature ==
- “Betrothed”, a short story by Anton Chekhov, called “The Fiancée” in some editions
