= Grandfather (poem) =

1870 poem by Nikolai Nekrasov

- Author: Nikolai Nekrasov
- Original title: Дедушка
- Language: Russian
- Publisher: Otechestvennye Zapiski
- Publication date: 1870
- Publication place: Russian Empire
- Media type: Print (hardback & paperback)

Grandfather (Дедушка, Dedushka) is a poem by Nikolai Nekrasov, written (according to the autograph) on 30 July - 8 August 1870 and first published in the September, No.9, 1870 issue of Otechestvennye Zapiski. It came out with a dedication to Zinaida Nikolayevna, Nekrasov's wife.

== Return from exile ==
The prototype of the poem's hero is believed to be the Decembrist Sergey Volkonsky whose return to Moscow from the Siberian exile in 1856 was warmly greeted by the Russian intelligentsia. But while a former Russian army general re-emerged (according to Ivan Aksakov) "a wise, peaceful man, full of most ardent admiration to the modern day reforms started by our monarch," Nekrasov made a point to show his Grandfather as an unrepentant rebel, disgusted with the tsarist regime.
