= Betrothed (short story) =

- Short story by Anton Chekhov
- 1954 illustration by D.A. Kubinsky
- Original title: Невеста
- Language: Russian

Publication
- Published in: Zhurnal Dlya Vsekh (1903)
- Publisher: Adolf Marks (1903, 1906)
- Publication date: December 1903
- Publication place: Russia

"Betrothed" (Russian: Невеста, romanized: Nevesta), translated also as "The Fiancée", is a 1903 short story by Anton Chekhov, first published in the No.12, December 1903 issue of Zhurnal Dlya Vsekh. Chekhov's last completed story, "Betrothed" features as its heroine Nadya, a young woman who escapes from a loveless betrothal and attends university, and thus asserts her independence. Another important character, Sasha, who prompts her to take this step, in the finale dies at a tuberculosis sanitarium, just as Chekhov himself was to do in 1904.

== Publication ==
Chekhov came up with the story's title apparently some time before he started writing it. On 20 October 1902, answering the 8 October 1902 Viktor Mirolyubov's telegram, in which the journal's editor asked what exactly could he promise his subscribers, Chekhov wrote: "If what you want from me is the story's title, let it be The Fiancée, although later it might be changed."

On 23 January 1903 he informed Olga Knipper: "I am writing now a story for Zhurnal Dlya Vsekh, in a slightly archaic manner, the 1870s style. No idea what may come out of it." On 30 January he wrote to her again, saying: "It's all getting so slow, a spoon per hour, maybe because there are too many characters in it, or could it be that I've lost the knack and have to learn to do it again?"

The author was well aware of the possible censorial interference. "I am afraid my Fiancee will be hard done by those suitors who are there to control your journal's chastity," he wrote to Mirolyubov on 9 February. On the 27th Chekhov sent the story to the journal. Asking to forgive him for several delays, he added: "My health fails me, and it's hard for me now to work in the ways I used to do, I get tired very soon."

In March and June, while reading the proofs, Chekhov subjected the text to serious revisions. Finally, it was published in the December issue of Zhurnal Dlya Vsekh. In a slightly revised version, it was included into Volume 12 of the 1903, second edition the Collected Works by A.P. Chekhov, published by Adolf Marks. It then appeared in Volume 11 of the posthumous, 1906 third edition.

== Plot summary ==
Nadya Shumina, a provincial 23-year-old, living on her grandmother's estate with her mother, is engaged to be married to Andrey Andreyevich, the son of a local priest. Her fiancé is a pleasant but shallow, unmotivated man who does nothing but play violin. Nadya likes him, but as their wedding date approaches she feels unhappy. She thinks often of Sasha, a distant relative with a serious illness who is staying with Nadya's family to "rest and recover," as he does every year.

Sasha often speaks candidly to Nadya, imploring her to turn her "life upside down." He criticizes her wealthy, idle life, pointing out that neither her, her family, nor her fiancé do any work, and live off the work of others. He describes this as "immoral" and "eating up someone [else's] life." He tells her she should go to Petersburg, where there are interesting and enlightened people, and study at the university.

When Nadya goes with Andrey Andreitch to see the house that is being prepared for the couple, she despises everything about it, feeling it represents "stupid, naïve, unbearable vulgarity." It becomes clear to her that she never loved her fiancé. She begins to see her mother as a weak, unhappy person, completely dependent on the charity of her mother-in-law, and does not want to follow in her footsteps.

Finally, shortly before the planned wedding date, Nadya decides to break all conventions and run away. When Nadya tells Sasha her decision, he is overjoyed, and they make plans for her secret departure. When Sasha leaves to take the train to Moscow, Nadya accompanies him to the station under the pretense of seeing him off, and then takes the train herself to Petersburg. Afterward she sends her family a telegram to tell them what she has done.

While at university, Nadya receives kind letters from home: it seems that her mother and grandmother have forgiven her. She misses them, and feels homesick.

After finishing her final examinations in May she goes home, and visits Sasha in Moscow on the way there. When she sees Sasha she notices the slovenly state of his room and clothing, and he seems to her less novel and cultured than she had previously imagined. He coughs, and appears very ill. She tells him she is indebted to him, and calls him her "nearest and dearest."

When Nadya arrives home, the houses, her mother, and her grandmother all seem older to her. Because of the way Nadya broke her engagement, her family's social status has decreased, her mother and grandmother are afraid to go outside in case they encounter Andrey Andreitch or his father, and Nadya is taunted by the neighbour's children. Nadya longs to return to Petersburg.

Later in the summer, they learn that Sasha has died of tuberculosis. Nadya reflects that her life had indeed been turned upside down as Sasha wished.

The story ends on an uncertain note: Nadya packs up her things, says goodbye to her family, and "full of life and high spirits [leaves] the town—as she supposed, forever."

== Reception ==
The story was widely discussed by both the critics and the reading public. Vikenty Veresayev remembered: "The day before [on 22 April 1903] at the Gorky's we were reading Chekhov's story "The Fiancée". Anton Pavlovich asked me: 'So, what do you think of my story?' I felt uncomfortable, but decided to speak in all honesty. 'Anton Pavlovich, this is not the way girls join the revolutionary movement. And girls like your Nadya do not go this way at all.' He looked at me with harsh alertness. 'There are different ways for them to go,' he said."

Sergey Elpatyevsky recalled how Chekhov asked him to read the story before it was published. "I did. This happened to be Betrothed, where for the first time some cheerful, life-affirming motifs appeared. For me, it became obvious that there was a change in Chekhov's whole mindset... and that it marked the start of the new period in his creative life." Several reviewers noted how unusual and new for Chekhov was the story's relatively optimistic finale. "[For the heroine] to leave the city means to abandon the thought of an egotistic existence... of life's banalities and join the shiny road of selfless labour," Maximilian Voloshin wrote in Kiyevskiye Otkliki. He compared Nadya favourably to Turgenev's girls, noting that while the latter were engaged mostly in the quest for love, Chekhov's heroines were longing for the meaning of life.

Positive reviews came from Mir Bozhy (Angel Bogdanovich, writing in the January 1904 issue), Pravda magazine (I. Johnson, May 1904) and Rus. "In all of his stories Chekhov comes across as an artist of a lofty ideal, it's just that this ideal is so high that before it our life seems dreary and trivial," wrote critic and playwright Vladimir Botsyanovsky, arguing that the once popular notion of Chekhov's indifference towards his characters had never had anything to do with reality.

Among those who thought little of Chekhov's new optimism, were Mikhail Gershenzon (Nauchnoye Slovo, January 1904) and the Marxist critic Viktor Shulyatikov. Gershenzon argued that "like most of Chekhov's stories, this one is more a sketch than a picture," and Chekhov's heroes and heroines "are contours, rather than portraits." Shulyatikov, while recognizing some positive moments in the story, still considered Nadya's motives to be vague, and opined that from the point of view of a true Marxist, Chekhov was but an "unreliable fellow traveller."

== Screen adaptations ==
- Невеста, 1956 by Grigory Nikulin, with Tatyana Piletskaya as Nadya. YouTube, 1 hour 21 minutes (Russian)
