= Vladimir Botsyanovsky =

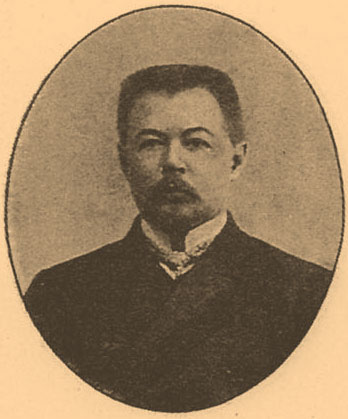
- Born: Vladimir Feofilovich Botsyanovsky; Владимир Феофилович Боцяновский; 28 June 1869; Volhynian Governorate, Russian Empire
- Died: 16 July 1943 (aged 74); Moscow, Soviet Union
- Occupations: journalist, critic, literary historian, playwright

Vladimir Feofilovich Botsyanovsky (Russian: Владимир Феофилович Боцяновский, 28 June 1869 – 16 July 1943) was a playwright, historian, journalist, literary critic and editor from the Russian Empire and later the Soviet Union.

Born in the Zhitomir region of Volhynian Governorate to a clergyman, he studied literature and history at the Saint Petersburg University. Having debuted as a journalist in 1885 in the Zhitomir newspaper Volhyn, in St Petersburg he started writing essays for Istorichesky Vestnik, Russkaya Starina and Novoye Vremya, among others. In the late 1890s, as a literary historian, he contributed more than thirty articles for the Brockhaus and Efron Encyclopedic Dictionary. His biographies of Leonid Andreyev, Vikenty Veresayev and Maxim Gorky came out as separate editions in 1903-1904, and the latter thanked him for his fine effort personally, by letter.

Botsyanovsky was a member the Russian Biological Society and in 1904-1905 served as its president. In 1903 he became a staff member of the newly-founded newspaper Rus and the head of its Literary Feuilleton section. After the closure of Rus in 1910 he continued with more of the same in the Moscow newspaper Utro Rossii (Morning of Russia). In 1907-1908 he edited the satirical magazine Seryi Volk (Grey Wolf), edited by Alexei Suvorin.

In early 1910s Botsyanovsky published the book Bogoiskateli (God-seekers), as well as several plays, including Sud Pilata (Trial Before Pilate), Novyie (The New Ones) and Moshkara (Moths), none of which has made it onto theatre stage, having failed to receive censorial license. For the private Suslov Theatre he translated Gogol's Revizor into Ukrainian.

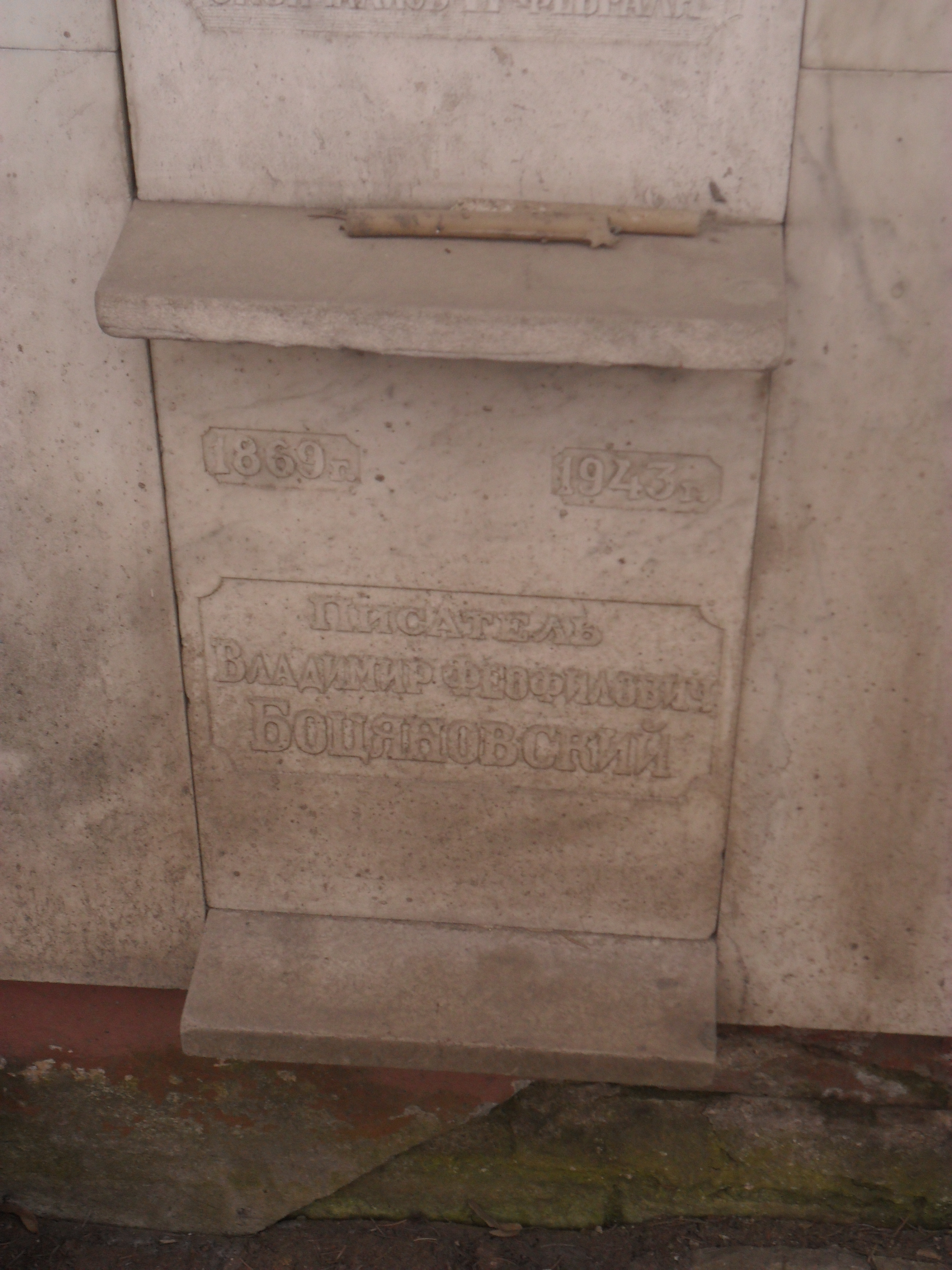
Columbarium plaque of Botsyanovsky at Novodevichy Cemetery in Moscow.

After the 1917 Revolution Botsyanovsky read the history of literature, first at the Institute of Journalism at ROSTA, then at the State Institute of the Art of Cinema in Leningrad. He contributed to the magazines Art for Workers and World of Adventures and was a member of the Society for Studying Ukrainian History, Literature and Music. He died in Moscow on 16 July 1943.
