= List of short stories by Ivan Bunin =

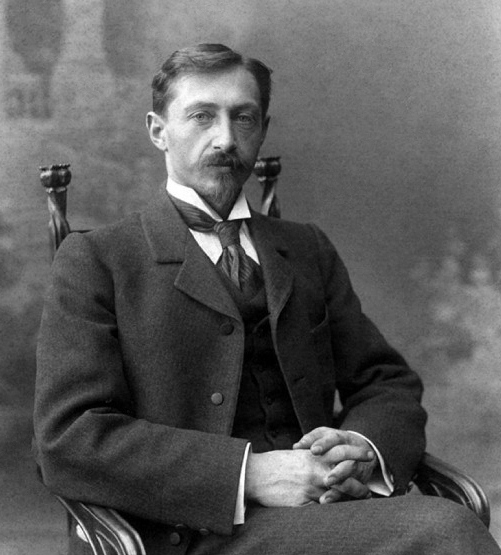
Ivan Bunin in 1901

This is a list of all short stories published by Nobel Prize for Literature laureate Ivan Bunin.

== 1890–1900 ==
1890

- The First Love (Pervaya lyubov, Первая любовь). First published in Orlovsky Vestnik newspaper, 1890, Nos. 26–27, February 13–14.

1891

- Fedosevna (Федосевна). Orlovsky Vestnik, 1891, No. 47, February 17, originally as "Dementyevna". In 1999, it was included in the compilation Three Stories, published in Kharkiv (two other authors were K.Lukashevich and N.Zablotskaya).
- Small Land Gentry (Melkopomestnuye, Мелкопоместные). Orlovsky Vestnik, 1891. Nos. 285, 317, 326, 331, 335, 340 (October 27 - December 22).
- In the Country (V Derevne, В деревне). Detskoye Chtenye (Reading for Children) magazine. Moscow, 1898, January, No. 1, as "From the Childhood Memories".

1892

- Tanhka (Танька). First published in Russkoye Bogatstvo, Saint Petersburg, 1893, No. 4, April, as "The Country Sketch "(Derevensky Eskiz). The magazine renamed the story without its author's consent and much to his chagrin.
- Kastryuk (Кастрюк). Russkoye Bogatstvo, Saint Petersburg, 1895, No. 4, April. Written in 1892 in Poltava. Maxim Gorky liked the story and recommended it to Nikolai Teleshov to be included in the literary anthology The People's Reading. Bunin included it into the collection called To the Edge of the World, in a massively revised version.
- At the Khutor (Na khutore, На хуторе). Russkoye Bogatstvo, 1895, No. 5, May. The story featured in two 1902 collections, To The Edge of the World and The Stories, originally as "The Fantasy Man" (Fantazyor, Фантазёр). In 1995, Gorky wrote to Anton Chekhov: "Started to read Bunin's stories. Occasionally, he makes it good, but don't you feel he copies you? Фантазёр, as I see it, is written under your direct influence."

1893

- News from Motherland (Vesti s Rodiny, Вести с родины). Russkoye Bogatstvo, Saint Petersburg, 1895, No. 6, June, under the title "The Unexpected Thing" (Neozhidannost, Неожиданность). According to Vera Muromtseva-Bunina, the story's hero was a peasant friend of Bunin in his youth, who later fell victim to the all-Russian famine. ("The Life of Bunin", p. 84) The reviewer of Obrazovanye (Education) magazine (1902, No. 12, December) called it "the finest of Bunin's pieces."
- In the Foreign Place (Na tchuzhoi storone, На чужой стороне). Mir Bozhiy, 1895, No. 4, April, as "Holy Night" (Svyataya notch, Святая ночь).

1894

- To the Edge of the World (Na krai sveta, На край света). Novoye Slovo, 1895, No. 1, October, subtitled "From the Notebook" and with the dedication to D.I. Zverev, a statistician who invited Bunin to the settlement used by the local villagers as a base during their trips to the Ussuri krai. "Critics praised the story so highly that... the Saint Petersburg Society of Care for the Re-settlers invited me to read a lecture. I read To the Edge of the World, of course," he wrote. The story was also included in the Primal Love collection.
- The Teacher (Utchitel, Учитель). Novoye Slovo, 1896, No. 7, April, as "Tarantella", subtitled: "From the life of the rural intelligentsia". "The story is true to life and sad is its final... Bunin surely knows the Russian village well, sympathises with its people, but, most importantly, is able to convey their moods without pomposity or sentimentality," Russkaya Mysl (1897, No. 5, May) reviewer commented.

1895

- In the Field (V Pole, В поле). Novoye Slovo, 1896, No. 3, December, originally as "Baibaki". Included in the Primal Love collection. Features an autobiographical scene: Yakov Petrovich plays guitar and sings the romance "Why are you silent and sit so quietly?" - the way Bunin would later describe his father doing.
- Holy Mountains (Svyatyie Gory, Святые горы). The date of the first publication of the story is unknown. As "On Donets" (Na Dontse, На донце), it featured in To the Edge of the World collection. In a revised version, it was published as "Holy Mountains" by Poslednye Novosti (Latest News) newspaper (1930, No. 3279, March 15) in Paris.
- At the Dacha (Na Datche, На даче). To the Edge of the World collection, 1897. Originally titled "A Day at the Dacha". Inspired by the sudden appearance in Poltava of a large group of Tolstoyans in 1891, according to brother Yuli Bunin. Ivan Bunin in 1893 himself fell under the strong influence of Lev Tolstoy's ideas and later described himself as 'a Tolstoyan'. The story has never appeared in a magazine. It was rejected by Alexander Skabichevsky of Novoye Slovo who (in a letter dated August 27, 1896) suggested the story was 'too feullieton-like'... Here are just several freaks, and a Tolstovian, well above them," he wrote. Bunin thought Skabichevsky's opinion was "very spiteful and totally unjust." Later, in October of the same year, the story was refused by Viktor Goltsev of Russkaya Mysl.
- Velga (Велга). Syn Otechestva, Nos. 4 and 5, January 5 and 6, 1899, subtitled "The Northern Legend" (Severnaya Legenda). In a letter to Sergey Krivenko, Bunin described his version of "a Scandinavian legend, inspired by intensive readings about the North, the Arctic seas, etc."

1897

- Rootless (Bez Rodu-plemeni, Без роду-племени). Mir Bozhiy, 1899, April No. 4. Subtitled: "From the story of a modern man", with the epigraph "Vae divitibus!"

1898

- The Cockoo (Kukushka, Кукушка). Vskhody (Shoots) magazine, Saint Petersburg, 1899, No. 1, January.
- "By a Cossack Route" ("Kazatskim khodom", "Казацким ходом"). Vskhody, 1899, No. 21, November. Under the title "On Tchayka". Included in the Poems and Stories, 1900 collection.
- The Range (Pereval, Перевал). Russkaya Mysl, Moscow, 1901. No. 8, August. Alongside "The Bonfire" and "In August" (under the common title "Three stories"). Written in 1892–1998.

1899

- Late at Night (Pozdney Nochyu, Поздней ночью). Northern Flowers (Severnye tsvety) almanac, Moscow, 1901. Viktor Mirolyubov suspected autobiographical motives, and even warned the author against revealing details of his own family life to the public. Later, Bunin maintained the story had nothing to do with him.

== 1900–1909 ==
1900

- Antonov Apples (Antonovskiye Yabloki, Антоновские яблоки). Zhizn (Life), 1900, No. 10, October, Saint Petersburg. Included in the Primal Love collection. According to Bunin's August 1891 letter to his then partner Varvara Pashchenko, the story was inspired by his visit to his brother Yevgeny's estate. Gorky praised the story's stylistic brilliance but was critical of its ideological and aesthetic substance. "Antonov Apples: smell good, but not of democracy," he remarked in his letter to Konstantin Pyatnitsky in November 1901.
- Epitaph (Epitafiya, Эпитафия). Zhurnal Dlya Vsekh (Journal for Everyone), Saint Petersburg, 1901, No. 8, August, under the title "Ore" (Ruda, Руда) and dedicated to Sergey Elpatyevsky. Included in The Primal Love collection. Initially, Bunin intended to publish it (as "Holy Mother's Cloak", Pokrov Bogoroditsy) in the Zhizn magazine, but in June 1901, this magazine was shut by the authorities.
- Over the city (Nad Gorodom, Над городом). Zhurnal Dlya Vsekh, 1902, No. 11, November. The Primal Love.
- Meliton (Мелитон). Zhurnal Dlya Vsekh, 1901, No. 7, July, as "Skit". Included in the book The Primal Love (as "Meliton"). Praised by editor Viktor Mirolyubov, "Skit"/"Meliton" marked the beginning of Bunin's long collaboration with this Saint Petersburg magazine. Censors cut the last three lines of the story, much to the author's outrage.

1901

- Pines (Sosny, Сосны). Mir Bozhy, 1901, No. 11, November. Primal Love. "...Pines - is something that is very new, fresh and good, but a bit too compact, like a thick bullion," Anton Chekhov wrote to Bunin. Critic I. Johnson who found "the lack of familial social sensibilities" in the story deplorable, was among the detractors.
- New Road (Novaya doroga, Новая дорога). Zhizn, 1901, No. 4, April. Pyotr Yakubovich, writing in Russkoye Bogatstvo found this short story an example of Bunin's tendency to distance himself from real life, excelling in making fine pictures of it. "A finely crafted picture of a night in a train, casual talks and thoughts accompanied by wagon wheels," wrote critic Alexander Izmaylov in 1913.
- Fog (Tuman, Туман). Zhizn, 1901, No. 4, April.
- Silence (Tishina, Тишина). Mir Bozhy, 1901, No. 7, July. Originally titled "On the Geneva Lake" (Na Zhenevskom ozere, На Женевском озере). Inspired by Bunin's visit to Switzerland. Some descriptions and observations have been apparently reproduced by Bunin from his November 1900 letter to his brother Yuly.
- Bonfire (Kostyor, Костёр). Russkaya Mysl, Moscow, 1901, No. 8, August. Alongside two other stories ("The Range" and "In August") under the common title "Three Stories".
- In August (V avguste, В августе). Russkaya Mysl, 1901, No. 8, August. Alongside two other stories under the common title "Three Stories". Some details here, like the visit of Leo Tolstoy's followers, or the walks along the streets of a provincial town, reminiscent of Poltava, are autobiographical.
- In the Autumn (Osenju, Осенью). Mir Bozhy, 1902, No. 1, January, subtitled "The Sketch" (Eskiz, Эскиз). Chekhov was not impressed. "Bunin's In the Autumn: done with a tense, unrelaxed hand," he wrote in a letter to Olga Knipper on January 31, 1902.
- New Year (Novy god, Новый год). Russkaya Mysl, 1902, No. 1, January.
- Dawn All Night (Zarya vsyu notch, Заря всю ночь). Russkaya Mysl, 1902, No. 7, July, under the title "A Rendez-Vous" (Svidanje, Свиданье) and dedicated to Maria Chekhova. Featured in the compilation Little Ship (Korablik, Кораблик, 1907), as "Happiness" (Shchastje, Счастье).

1902

- "Hope" ("Nadezhda", "Надежда"). The Stories (Rasskazy, Рассказы, 1902) compilation. According to Vera Muromtseva-Bunina, in 1902, Bunin wrote just one piece of prose, and that was "Hope". Nikolai Teleshov, to whom the author sent the story, was unimpressed. "No, Iv[an] Al[exeyevich]! The story might be lean, but it is hardly muscular... Feels like reading somebody else's letters... Put simply, I dislike it, that is all," he wrote on 15 March 1902. Bunin disagreed. "As for 'Hope', you are just wrong: it is a beautiful, subtle thing. And there is no need for you to cringe; it's not obnoxious that I'm trying here to be, just frank," he replied on 21 March.

1903

- Dreams (Sny, Сны). Znanye compilation, Book 1, Saint Petersburg, 1904, with another story "The Golden Bottom" (Zolotoye dno, Золотое дно), under the common title "Blacksoil" (Tchernozyom, Чернозём). All in all, Bunin's prose featured in sixteen Znanye compilations. Both stories received good press. "Bunin is a laconic painter, working in sketches. Artfulness is not for him; he is too an artist for that. And if his characters look like social types, that is because the extraordinary realism of their author makes them undeniably typical," wrote critic Alexander Amfiteatrov.
- Golden Bottom (Zolotoye dno, Золотое дно). Znanye collection, Book 1, Saint Petersburg, 1904, along with "Dreams", as part of the two-piece "Blacksoil". This story later gave the title to Bunin's collection which came out in 1913 and, in a revised version, in 1914. While preparing it for the later, Bunin divided the text into five chapters and parted with the fragments describing old-time landlords' cruelty towards serf peasants.
- Distant Things (Dalyokoye, Далёкое). Pravda (Truth) magazine, 1904, No. 3, March, under the title "In Corns" (V khlebakh, В хлебах). In The Complete Works by I. A. Bunin, it featured as "The Dream of Oblomov the Grandson". In Paris (Poslednye Novosty newspaper, 1937, No. 5993, August 22), Bunin published a renewed version of the story, entitled "Eight Years" (Vosem let, Восемь лет) with a footnote: "The Life of Arsenyev. The first draft version".

1906

- Figures (Tsifry, Цифры). Novoye Slovo (The New Word) compilation, Vol. 1, Moscow, 1907. Mikhail Chekhov considered it "one of the best stories of the last years" (15 June 1907 letter to Bunin).
- In the Beginning (U istoka dney, У истока дней). Shipovnik (Wild Rose) almanac, Saint Petersburg, 1907. The story's new version was published in Poslednye Novosty, Paris (December 29, 1929, No. 3203), entitled "The Mirror" (Zerkalo, Зеркало) with a subtitle: "From the early drafts of The Life of Arsenyev". The 1964 Complete Works by I. A. Bunin features "The Mirror" as an addendum to the novel.
- White Horse (Belaya loshad, Белая лошадь). Shipovnik almanac, 1908, as "Asthma" (Астма). In emigration, Bunin re-worked the story: its first part appeared in Vozrozhdenye (Revival) newspaper (Paris, 1927, No. 639, March 3), subtitled "The Story". The second was published in Poslednye Novosty (Paris, 1929, No. 3122, October 9), again as "White Horse", but subtitled "Extracts from the novel". The story had been conceived long before its publication. "Where is your 'White Death', Ivan Alekseyevich? It just has to feature in Znanye [compilation]," wrote Gorky to Bunin in a letter dated November 25, 1900. In 1905 Pravda magazine announced the publication of 'White Death', but it never came out.

1907

- Bird's Shadow (Tenh ptitsy, Тень птицы). Zemlya (Earth) almanac, Vol. 1, Moscow, 1908.
- The Sea of Gods (More bogov, Море богов). Severnoye Siyanie (Northern Lights) magazine, Saint Petersburg, 1908, No. 11, November.
- Delta (Дельта). Poslednye Novosty, Paris, 1932, No. 4085, May 29. In the 1915 edition of the Complete Works by I. A. Bunin, it featured as part of another story, called "The Light of Zodiac".
- The Light of Zodiac (Svet Zodiaka, Свет Зодиака). Poslednye Novosty, Paris 1929, No. 3000, June 9.
- Judea (Иудея). Drykarh anthology, Moscow, 1910. Originally, parts of it, The Stone and Sheol, were separate stories.

1908

- The Stone (Kamenh, Камень). Poslednye Novosty, Paris, 1929, No. 2930, March 31. In the 1915 edition of Complete Works by I. A. Bunin, it featured as chapters 4 and 5 of "Judea".

1909

- A Little Romance (Malenky roman, Маленький роман). Severnoye Siyanye (Northern Lights) magazine, Saint Petersburg, 1905, No. 5, March, originally as "The Old Song" (Staraya pesnya, Старая песня). Incorporated into the text were fragments of the earlier etude, "Night Bird" (Nochnaya ptitsa, Ночная птица) and the short story "The Coockoo". In a shortened version was published in Paris, 1926 (Vozrozhdenye, No. 478, September 23).
- Birds of Heaven (Ptitsy nebesnye, Птицы небесные). Znanye, Vol. 27, Saint Petersburg, 1909, as "Poor Is the Devil" (Beden bes, Беден бес). In a renewed, shortened version, it appeared in Vozrozhdenye (Paris), No. 599, January 22, 1927.
- The Country Fair Eve (Podtorzhje, Подторжье). Zveno (Link) magazine, Paris, 1925, No. 106, February 9, with a note: "The unused fragment of The Village". Written in Vasilyevskoye, Bunin's cousin's estate, about a country fair in Glotovo, Oryol Governorate.
- Sheol (Шеол). Bird's Shadow, Paris, 1931. In the 1915 edition of the Complete Works by I. A. Bunin it featured as chapter 6 of "Judea".
- The Devil's Desert (Pustynya diavola, Пустыня дьявола). Russkoye Slovo, Moscow, 1909, No. 296, December 25.
- The Land of Sodom (Strana sodomskaya, Страна содомская). Russkoye Slovo, 1911, No. 158, July 10, as "The Dead Sea" (Myortvoye more, Мёртвое море).
- Temple of the Sun (Khram Solntsa, Храм Солнца). Sovremenny Mir, Saint Petersburg, 1909, No. 12, December.

== 1910–1917 ==
1910

- The Village (Derevnya, Деревня), a short novel written in 1909 and first published by Sovremenny Mir in Saint Petersburg (Nos. 3, 10–11, 1910), under the title The Novelet (Повесть).

1911

- Dry Valley (Sukhodol, Суходол), a short novel, first published by Vestnik Evropy, in its April 1912 issue.
- The Scream (Krik, Крик). Russkoye Slovo, 1911. No. 225, October 1. Featured in the Kinky Ears and Other Stories (New York, 1954). According to the manuscript, the story, written on June 26–28, 1911, was originally called "Atanas". It was based on a real episode that the author witnessed, when the sailors of a Russian ship made a Greek passenger drunk just for fun.
- The Death of the Prophet (Smert proroka, Смерть пророка). Russkoye Slovo, 1911, No. 298, December 28, as "The Death of Moses" (Smert Moiseya, Смерть Моисея).
- The Snow Bull (Snezhny byk, Снежный бык). Put (The Way) magazine, Moscow, 1911, No. 1, November, as "From the Untitled Stories" (Iz rasskazov bez nazvaniya, Из рассказов без названия). "Insomnia" (Bessonnitsa, Бессонница) was the original title of the story written on June 29 - July 2 [old style], according to the autograph. Featured in the Ioann the Mourner (1913) collection.
- The Ancient Man (Drevny tchelovek, Древний человек). Russkoye Slovo, 1911, No. 187, August 14, as "One Hundred and Eight" (Sto vosem, Сто восемь). Re-titled for the 1930 publication (Paris, Poslednye Novosti, No. 3441, August 24). It was written on July 3–8, 1911, in Glotovo, according to the autograph.
- Strength (Sila, Сила). Russkoye Slovo, 1911, No. 214, September 18.
- The Good Life (Khoroshaya zhyzn, Хорошая жизнь). Sovremenny Mir (Modern World) magazine, Saint Petersburg, 1912, No. 1, January. On 21 December 1911, Bunin wrote to Teleshov from Capri: "We visit him [Gorky] once in two or three days, on evenings. Sit there, ranting against the modern literature and writers. Writing all day long, I have produced two stories, sent them to Sovremenny Mir and Vseobschy Ezhemesyachnik (Everybody's Monthly)."
- A Cricket (Sverchok, Сверчок). Vseobschy Ezhemesyachnik, Saint Petersburg. 1911, No. 12, December. Written while on Capri.
- The Night Time Talk (Nochnoy razgovor, Ночной разговор). Sbornik Pervy (Volume One). The Publishing Comradeship of Writers, Saint Petersburg, 1912. Written on Capri, on December 19–23, 1911. Twice the author informed his correspondents (Nikolai Klestov and Yuli Bunin, December 24 and 28, respectively) of the success the story has had among Gorky's guests. The conservative press criticised "The Night Time Talk" for what they saw as excessive naturalism. "The new story by Bunin... shows that under the laureate's dress-coat, there's nothing left except for bad taste and short thoughts. Again, as in The Village, pig sty is everywhere," Viktor Burenin wrote in Novoye Vremya. It was negatively reviewed by the newspapers Stolichnaya Molva (Capital's Talk), Zaprosy Zhizni (Life's Demands) and Russkiye Vedomosti.
- Happy House (Vesyoly dvor, Весёлый двор). Zavety (Testaments) magazine, Saint Petersburg, 1912, No. 1, April. Finished in December 1911, while on Capri, it was originally titled "Mother and Son" (Mat i syn, Мать и сын). Maxim Gorky informed Ekaterina Peshkova in a letter:
  At eight [in the evening], Bunin started reading his finely written story about mother and son. Mother is being starved to death, while her son, a loafer and a slacker, just drinks, then dances drunk on her grave and after that goes and lies himself upon rails and gets both his legs cut off by the train. All this, written with exceptional skills, still makes one depressed. Were listening: Kotsyubinsky, who's got an ailing heart, Tcheremnov, a tuberculosis sufferer, Zolotaryov, a man who cannot find his own self, and me, whose brain aches, not to speak of head and bones. Afterwards, we were arguing a lot about the Russian people and their destiny...
- Gennisaret (Геннисарет). Russkoye Slovo, Moscow, 1912, No. 297, December 25. Written on Capri on 9 December 1911. In the 1927 publication (Vozrozhdenye, Paris, text changed) it is dated "1907-1927".

1912

- Zakhar Vorobyov (Захар Воробьёв). Znanye compilation, 1912, Vol. 38, Saint Petersburg.
- Ignat (Игнат). Russkoye Slovo, Moscow, 1912, Nos. 162, 164–167, July 14, 17–20. The Loopy Ears and Other Stories collection. F. I. Blagov, having received the manuscript, found the story too naturalistic, and Bunin spent a month editing the text.
- Yermil (Ермил). Sovremennik, Saint Petersburg, 1913, No. 1, January, as "The Crime" (Prestuplenye, Преступление). Written on December 26–27, 1912, on Capri. The title was changed for the inclusion into The Last Rendez-Vous (Последнее свидание) collection.
- The Prince of the Princes (Knyaz vo knyzyakh, Князь во князьях), originally called "Lukyan Stepanov". Vestnik Evropy, Saint Petersburg, 1913, No. 3, March. "December 30 (evening) - 31 (morning), 1912, Capri", according to the author's autograph.
- The Last Rendez-Vous (Posledneye svidaniye, Последнее свидание). Vestnik Evropy, Saint Petersburg, 1913, No. 3, March, originally as "Vera". Dated "December 31, 1912 (evening)" according to the autograph. The title was changed as Bunin was preparing the new book of short stories, which was also called The Last Rendez-Vous.

1913

- Sacrifice (Zhertva, Жертва). Sovremenny Mir, 1913, No. 3, March, as "Iliya the Prophet" (Илья Пророк). The Last Rendez-Vous collection.
- Zabota (Забота). Russkoye Slovo, Moscow, 1913, No. 55, March 7. [The story's main character Avdey Zabota's surname translates as "anxiety", "worry"].
- Everyday Life (Budni, Будни). Russkoye Slovo, 1913, No. 34, February 10. Dated "January 25–26, February 7–8, 1913", on a typewritten copy.
- Licharda (Личарда). Russkoye Slovo, Moscow, 1913, No. 61. March 14.
- The Last Day (Posledny den, Последний день). Retch (Speech) newspaper, Saint Petersburg, 1913. No. 47. February 17. According to the typewritten copy note, written on February 1–15. Several reviewers criticised the author for grotesque depictions and his alleged lack of sympathy towards his heroes.
- Fresh Shoots (Vskhody Novye, Всходы новые). Retch, 1913, No. 102, April 14, as "The Spring" (Vesna, Весна). "February 2, 1913, Capri", according to the autograph.
- Holy Lance (Kopyo gospodne, Копьё господне). Russkaya Molva newspaper, Saint Petersburg, 1913, No. 88, March 10, under the title "The Spear Wound" (Rana ot kopya, Рана от копья).
- Ioann the Mourner (Ioann Rydalets, Иоанн Рыдалец). Vestnik Evropy, 1913, No. 4, April.
- Lean Grass (Khudaya trava, Худая трава). Sovremennik, 1913, No. 4, April. Dated "February 22, Capri".
- Dust (Pyl, Пыль). The Chalice of Life (Чаша жизни). Short stories, 1913–1914. Moscow, 1915.
- Rodion, The Lyre Man (Lirnik Rodion, Лирник Родион). Russkoye Slovo, Moscow, 1913. No. 87, April 14, as "The Psalm". Based on a real-life episode, Bunin's conversation with a traveling musician Rodion Kucherenko, in the village of Romashev, near Kiev.
- The Fairytale (Skazka, Сказка). Russkoye Slovo, 1913. No. 87, April 14, along with "The Psalm". "March 12–15, 1913, Anacapri", according to the autograph.
- Of Noble Blood (Khoroshikh krovei, Хороших кровей). Russkoye Slovo, 1913, No. 174, July 28. Later, with minor changes, in Vozrozhdenye, Paris, 1926, No. 562, December 16.
- By the Road (Pri doroge, При дороге). Slovo (Word) compilation, Moscow, 1913, No. 1.
- The Chalice of Life (Tchasha zhizni, Чаша жизни). Vestnik Evropy, 1913, No. 12, December. Included in the Mitya's Love collection. Earlier fragments of the story appeared in Russkoye Slovo (1913, No. 120, May 26) as "O.Kir".
- I Still Say Nothing (Ya vsyo molchu, Я всё молчу). Russloye Slovo, 1913, No. 231, October 8. The Loopy Ears and Other Stories collection.

1914

- The Saints (Svyatyie, Святые). Vestnik Evropy. 1914. No. 4, April. Features in Mitya's Love collection. Dated by the author as "January 23 - February 6, 1914, Capri". Originally called "Alina the Harlot" (Блудница Алина).
- The Spring Evening (Vesenny vecher, Весенний вечер). Slovo compilation, Moscow, 1915, No. 4. The Loopy Ears and Other Stories collection. Dated "January 31 - February 12, 1914, Capri" by the author.
- Brothers (Bratya, Братья). Slovo compilation, Moscow, 1914, No. 3. Mitya's Love.
- Klasha (Клаша). Russkoye Slovo, 1914, No. 108, May 11, originally as "The First Step" (Pervy shag, Первый шаг). There is a handwritten copy of it in the Russian State Archives of Literature and Arts (ЦГАЛИ) titled "Klasha Smirnova".
- The Archive Case (Arkhivnoye delo, Архивное дело). Russkoye Slovo, 1914, No. 297, December 25, as "The Christmas Story".

1915

- The Grammar of Love (Grammatika lyubvi, Грамматика любви). Klitch (The Summoning, Клич), the World War I victims charity almanac, edited and compiled by Bunin, Vikenty Veresayev and Nikolai Teleshov. Moscow, 1915. Mitya's Love. Dated "Moscow, 18.II. 1915".
- The Gentleman from San Francisco (Gospodin iz San-Francisco, Господин из Сан-Франциско). Slovo compilation, Moscow, 1915, No. 5. Loopy Ears and Other Stories. Gave its title to the 1916 book.

1916

- The Son (Syn, Сын). Severnye Zapiski (Northern Notes) magazine, Petrograd, 1916, No. 3, March.
- Kazimir Stanislavovich (Казимир Станиславович). Letopis (The Chronicle) magazine, Petrograd, 1916, No. 5, May. Several initial titles have been discarded ("Lev Kazimirovich" and "The Shady Man", among them). Dated: "March 16, 1916, Glotovo".
- The Song of Gots (Pesnya o gotse, Песня о гоце). Orlovsky Vestnik, 1916, No. 81, April 10. Loopy Ears.
- The Light Breath (Lyogkoye dykhaniye, Лёгкое дыхание). Russkoye Slovo, Moscow, 1916, No. 83, April 10. The Judea in Spring collection.
- Aglaya (Аглая). Letopis, Petrograd, 1916, No. 10, October. Loopy Ears.
- The Dreams of Chang (Sny Tchanga, Сны Чанга). Objedineniye (Alliance) almanac, Odessa, 1919. Judea in Spring.
- Loopy Ears (Petlistye ushi, Петлистые уши). Slovo compilation, 1917, No. 7. Loopy Ears and Other Stories (1954).
- The Compatriot (Sootechestvennik, Соотечественник). Slovo compilation, Moscow, 1919, No. 8. Originally called "Felix Tchuyev".
- Otto Stein (Отто Штейн). Yuzhnoye Slovo, Odessa, 1920, No. 112, January 1.
- The Old Woman (Starukha, Старуха). Russkoye Slovo, Moscow, 1916, No. 298. December 15, along with two other stories, "The Fasting" and "The Third Cock-crow", under the common title "Three Stories".
- The Fasting (Post, Пост). Russkoye Slovo, Moscow, 1916, No. 298. December 15.
- The Third Cock-crow (Tretji petukhi, Третьи петухи). Russkoye Slovo, Moscow, 1916, No. 298. December 15.
- The Last Spring (Poslednyaya vesna, Последняя весна). Posleniye Novosti, Paris, 1931, No. 3672. April 12.
- The Last Autumn (Poslednyaya osen, Последняя осень). The Complete Works by I. A. Bunin, Petropolis, Berlin, 1934–1936. Vol. 10. Prior to that, unpublished.

== 1917–1929 ==
1917

- The Rose of Jerico (Roza Iyerikhona, Роза Иерихона). Nash Mir (Our World) magazine, Berlin, 1924, No. 13, June 15. The exact date is unknown. The title story of Bunin's first book, published in emigration, it was technically a preface then.
- The Quarrel (Bran, Брань). Russkaya Gazeta, Paris, 1924, No. 103, August 24, under the title "The Dispute" (Спор). In 1929, under the title "Nineteen Seventeen" (Семнадцатый год) appeared in Posledniye Novosti, Paris, No. 1899, February 28.

1918

- Exodus (Iskhod, Исход). Skrizhal (The Tablet) almanac, Petrograd, 1918, No. 1, under the title "The End" (Конец). Also in Rodnaya Zemlya (Native Land) magazine, Kiev, September 1918. The final version was written in 1918, the original rough draft dated "1914, Capri".
- Winter Sleep (Zimniy son, Зимний сон). Ranneye Utro (Early Morning) newspaper, Moscow, 1918, No. 43, March 21. Bunin's last story was published in Moscow, before his emigration.

1919

- Gotami (Готами). Russky Emigrant magazine, Berlin, 1920, No. 4. November 1–14. Judea in Spring. Written in Odessa.

1920

- The Meteor (Метеор). Obshcheye Delo (Common Cause) newspaper, Paris, 1921, No. 176, January 7, as "Distant Things" (Далёкое). Dated "December 27, 1920, Paris".

1921

- The Third Class (Tretiy klass, Третий класс). Novaya Russkya Zhyzn (New Russian Life) newspaper, Helsingfors, 1921, No. 74, April 2, under the title "The Notebook" (Записная книжка). Dated "March 20". In a heavily edited (authorised) version and under the new title published by Illustrirovannaya Rossiya (Illustrated Russia) in Paris, 1926, No. 7 (40), February 13.
- Temir-Aksak-Khan (Темир-Аксак-Хан). Vereteno (Spinning Wheel) almanac, Berlin, 1922, No. 1. Judea in Spring.
- Night of Renunciation (Notch otrecheniya, Ночь отречения). Zveno newspaper, Paris, 1912, No. 47, December 24, along with the poem "Primorye Way" (Приморский путь) under the common title "The Lion Island" (Львиный остров).
- Mad Artist (Bezumny khudozhnik, Безумный художник). Okno (Window) almanac, Paris, 1923, Book I. Judea in Spring. Originally titled "The Birth of a New Man" (Рождение нового человека). Autograph date: "October 18, 1921".
- Of Yemelya the Fool Who Came Out Smarter Than Everybody (O durake Yemele, kakoi vyshel vsekh unneye, О Дураке Емеле, какой вышел всех умнее). Okno almanac, Paris, 1923, Book II. The Rose of Jericho.
- The End (Konets, Конец). Zveno, Paris, 1923, No. 6. March 12, under the title "Destruction" (Гибель). Judea In Spring.
- The Mowers (Kostsy, Косцы). Medny Vsadnik (The Copper Horseman) almanac, Berlin, 1923, book I. Judea in Spring.
- Midnight Lightning (Polunochnaya zarnitsa, Полуночная зарница). Sovremennye zapiski magazine, Paris, 1924, Book XX, as "The Star of Love" (Звезда любви).
- Transformation (Preobrazhenye, Преображение). Sovremennye zapiski, 1924, Book XX. Loopy Ears. Among the earlier titles discarded were: "The Coachman" (Ямщик), "Gavril" (Гаврил), "Ivan Ryazanov" (Иван Рязанов).

1922

- Distant Things (Dalyuokoye, Далёкое). Rul (Steering Wheel) newspaper, Berlin, 1924, Nos. 1153, 1154, September 18 and 19. Originally titled "Once in the Spring" (Однажды весной).

1923

- The Unknown Friend (Neizvestny drug, Неизвестный друг). Zlatotsvet almanac, Berlin, 1924. Mitya's Love.
- In the Night Sea (V notchnom more, В ночном море). Okno almanac, Paris, 1924, book III. Mitya's Love. Dated "18 (31) July 1923".
- In One Kingdom (V nekotorom tsarstve, В некотором царстве). Illustrirovannaya Rossiya magazine, Paris, 1924, No. 1.
- The Devouring Fire (Ogon pozhirayushchi, Огонь пожирающий). Rul, 1924, No. 1129, August 21. Originally as "The Fire Oven" (Пещь огненная).
- The Belated Spring (Nesrochnaya vesna, Несрочная весна). Sovremennye zapiski, 1924, Vol. XVIII. Loopy Ears.

1924

- The City of the King of Kings (Gorod Tsarya Tsarei, Город Царя Царей). Rul, 1925, Nos. 1284, 1285, February 22 and 24. The edited version appeared in Posledniye Novosti, 1928, No. 2862, January 22. Loopy Ears. The story describes one episode that happened during Bunin's visit to Ceylon in 1911.
- The Saint (Svyatitel, Святитель). Illyustrirovannaya Rossiya, 1924, No. 9, December 15, along with another story, "The Blind Man" (Слепой), under the common title "The Short Stories" (Короткие рассказы). Judea in Spring.
  The story's idea gets a mention in Bunin's diary's May 6, 1919, entry, where he re-tells the legend of two Russian Orthodox saints, Dmitry of Rostov and Ioann of Tambov, where the latter features as a 'simpleton poet', author of touchingly naive verses.
- The Saints' Day (Imeniny, Именины). Zveno, 1924, No. 95, November 24, along with two more stories ("Music" and "Scarabei") under the common title Outside (Вне).
- Skarabei (Скарабеи). Zveno, 1924, No. 95, November 24, originally titled "Bugs" (Жучки). Judea in Spring.
- The Music (Музыка). Zveno, 1924, No. 95, November 24.
- The Blind Man (Slepoi, Слепой). Illustrirovannaya Rossiya, 1924, No. 9, December 15.
- Flies (Mukhi, Мухи). Russkaya Gazeta, Paris, 1924, No. 57, June 29.
- A Neighbour (Sosed, Сосед). Sovremennye zapiski, 1924, Book XXII, under the title "The Red General". Mitya’s Love.
- Bast-shoes (Lapti, Лапти). Illustrirovannaya Rossiya, 1924, No. 4, August, as "Red Bast-shoes".
- Glory (Slava, Слава). Rul, 1924, Nos. 1185, 1186, October 25, 35.
- Inscriptions (Nadpisi, Надписи). Rul, 1924, No. 1236, December 25, as "Schone Aussicht".
- Rusak (Русак). Illyustrirovannaya Rossiya, 1925, No. 15, March 15, along with "The Book" (Книга).
- The Book (Kniga, Книга). Illyustrirovannaya Rossiya, 1925, No. 15, March 15.
- Mitya's Love. Sovremennye zapiski, 1925, Vols. XXIII, XXIV. A short novel that gave the 1925 book its title. Written in Grasse in the summer of 1924. The final version of the manuscript was dated September 27, 1924.

1925

- Sunstroke (Solnetchny udar, Солнечный удар). Sovremennye zapiski, 1926, Book XXVIII. Mitya’s Love.
- Ida (Ида). Vozrozhdenye, 1926, No. 2019, January 7. Mitya's Love. Dated "October 23 - December 19, 1925".
- The Mordovian Sarafan (Мордовский сарафан). Perezvony magazine, Paris, 1925, No. 2
- The Case of Cornet Yelagin (Delo korneta Yelagina, Дело корнета Елагина). Vozrozhdenye, 1926, No. 277, March 6 (fragments). Sovremennye zapiski, 1926, Book XXVIII (full version). Loopy Ears. Dated "September 11, 1925. Seaside Alps".
- The Night (Notch, Ночь). Sovremennye zapiski, 1925, Book XXVI, as "Cicadas" (Цикады).
- Burden (Obuza, Обуза). Vozrozhdenye, 1925, No. 97, September 7.

1926

- Waters Aplenty (Vody mnogiye, Воды многие). Came out in three parts. I: Rul, 1925, No. 1333, April 23 (under the title The Eternal Tablets, Вечные скрижали). II: Blagonamerenny (Good-willed) almanac, Brussels, 1926, Vol. I. III: Sovremennye zapiski, Paris, 1926, Book XXIX. Later, in 1937, in Posledniye Novosti, Paris (1937, No. 6118, December 25), Bunin published another sketch of the same title, in effect the final chapter of his account of his trip to Ceylon. This fragment never made its way into the final version.
- The Horror Story (Strashny rasskaz, Страшный рассказ). Zveno, 1926, No. 158, February 7. Judea in Spring.
- The Desecrated Spas (Поруганный Спас). Perezvony magazine, Riga, 1926, No. 20, May 26 - June 8. Judea in Spring.
- In the Garden (V sadu, В саду). Vozrozhdenye, 1926, No. 422, July 29. Dated "July 2 (15), 1926".
- God's Tree (Bozhje drevo, Божье древо). Sovremennye zapiski, 1927, Vol. XXXIII. Authorised date: "September 4 (old style), 1926".
- Alexey Alekseyevich (Алексей Алексеевич). Vozrozhdenye, 1927, No. 760, July 2. Loopy Ears, God's Tree. For the 1928 publication (Ilyustrirovannaya Rossiya, No. 17, April 21) re-titled (Pyotr Petrovich's Story, Рассказ Петра Петровича). In the God's Tree compilation, the original title was retrieved.
- Snowdrop (Podsnezhnik, Подснежник). Perezvony, 1927, No. 27, December. Loopy Ears. The story is based on Bunin's reminiscences of his gymnasium years in Yelets. In 1927, working upon The Life of Arsenyev, Bunin incorporated into the novel part of this story and re-worked the latter completely, changing the setting from the Christmas-based ('wintery'), into the Maslenitsa-related ('springy').

1927

- To Your Fathers' Origins (K rodu otsov svoikh, К роду отцов своих). Poslednye Novosti, 1928, No. 2580, April 15. Loopy Ears, God's Tree.
- The Old Port (Stary port, Старый порт). Poslednye Novosti, 1927, No. 2468. December 15, under the title "The Companion" (Спутник). Mitya’s Love. Under the new title, the God's Tree book was included.
- Just a Fuss (Suyeta Suyet, Суета сует). Vozrozhdenye, 1927, February 24. One of several sketches on Voltaire, based on a book on the French Revolution (Lepotre, Viellies maisons, vieux paniers), Bunin read in 1919 in Odessa.

1929

- Bernar (Бернар). Poslednye Novosti, 1929, No. 2916, March 17. God's Tree collection. The changed version features in the Judea in Spring book, where it is dated 1950.
- Penguins (Пингвины). Poslednye Novosti, 1929, No. 3199, December 25, alongside "The Benevolent Participation", under the common title "Two Stories". Judea in Spring.
- Benevolent Participation (Blagsklonnoye uchastiye, Благосклонное участие). Poslednye Novosti, 1929, No. 3199, December 25.

== 1930–1936 ==
1930

- Landau (Ландо). Poslednye Novosti, 1930, No. 3539. The "Brief Stories" cycle. One of the shortest etudes which Bunin wrote while working on The Life of Arsenyev, during the gap between parts IV and V. "Ivan Alekseyevich said today that he thought, one had to write very small, compressed pieces, several lines each, and that even great authors have several brilliant fragments, which just float in water," Bunin's secretary (and one time beau) Galina Kuznetsova wrote in her diary on October 1, 1930.
- The Killer (Ubiytsa, Убийца). Poslednye Novosti, Paris, 1930, No. 3539, November 30, under the title "The Murder" (Убийство). "Brief Stories". Judea in Spring.
- The Doomed House (Obrechyonny Dom, Обреченный дом). Posledniye Novosti, 1930, No. 3539, November 30, under the title "In the Doomed House" (В обреченном доме). "Brief Stories". Loopy Ears.
- The Idol (Идол). Posledniye Novosti, 1930, No. 3511, November 2. "Brief Stories". Judea in Spring.
- The Elephant (Slon, Слон). Posledniye Novosti, 1930, No. 3511, November 2. "Brief Stories". Judea in Spring. Authorised date: "September 29, 1930".
- The Bull-Calf Head (Telyachya golova, Телячья голова). Posledniye Novosti, 1930, No. 3511, November 2. "Brief Stories".
- Hunchback's Romance (Roman gorbuna, Роман горбуна). Posledniye Novosti, 1930, No. 3511, November 2. "Brief Stories".
- Youth (Molodost, Молодость). Posledniye Novosti, 1930, No. 3511, November 2. "Brief Stories", originally titled "The Student" (Студент).
- Red Lanterns (Krasnye fonari, Красные фонари). Posledniye Novosti, 1930, No. 3364, June 8, "Distant Things" cycle.
- Fungi (Gribok, Грибок). Posledniye Novosti, 1930, No. 3511, November 2. "Brief Stories". Authorised date: "October 4, 1930".
- Canyon (Ushchelye, Ущелье). Posledniye Novosti, 1930, No. 3364, June 8. "Distant Things". Judea in Spring.
- The First Love (Pervaya lyubov, Первая любовь). Novosti, 1930, No. 3511, November 2. "Brief Stories" cycles. Loopy Ears. Authorised date: October 2, 1930.
- The Sky Above the Wall (Nebo nad stenoi, Небо над стеной). God's Tree collection (prior to that, unpublished). Authorised date: October 24, 1930.
- Rendez-Vous (Svidaniye, Свидание). Novosti, 1930, No. 3469, September 21, originally untitled. "Brief Stories". Alongside 18 more miniatures, each given a title later, in the God's Tree collection.
- Cockerels (Petukhi, Петухи). Novosti, 1930, No. 3469, September 21, originally untitled. "Brief Stories".
- Myravsky Shlyakh (Муравский шлях). Novosti, 1930, No. 3469, September 21, originally untitled. "Brief Stories".
- Crucifixion (Paspyatiye, Распятие). Posledniye Novosti, 1932. No. 4036, April 10. "Brief Stories".
- Marja (Марья). Posledniye Novosti, 1932. No. 4036, April 10. "Brief Stories". Judea in Spring.
- The Horror (Uzhas, Ужас). Posledniye Novosti, 1930. No. 3539, November 30. "Brief Stories".
- Old Woman (Starukha, Старуха). Posledniye Novosti, 1930. No. 3539, November 30. "Brief Stories". God's Tree.
- The Fire (Pozhar, Пожар). Posledniye Novosti, Paris, 1930. No. 3364. June 8. "Brief Stories".
- Storks (Zhuravli, Жураавли). Posledniye Novosti, 1930. No. 3539, November 30. "Brief Stories". Judea in Spring. Authorised date: October 27, 1930.
- Maneater Girl (Lyudoyedka, Людоедка). Posledniye Novosti, 1930. No. 3469, September 21. "Brief Stories".
- On the Market Street (Na Bazarnoi, На базарной). Posledniye Novosti, 1930. No. 3539, November 30. "Brief Stories". Judea in Spring. In a rough copy was titled "Small Coffin"(Гробик) and dated "September 26, 1930".
- The Noon (Polden, Полдень). Posledniye Novosti, 1930. No. 3469, September 21, originally untitled. "Brief Stories".
- The Tramp (Brodyaga, Бродяга). Posledniye Novosti, 1930. No. 3469, September 21, untitled. "Brief Stories".
- Tears (Slyozy, Слёзы). Posledniye Novosti, 1930. No. 3469, September 21. "Brief Stories". Written in Odessa on January 20. Judea in Spring.
- The Capital (Капита). Posledniye Novosti, 1930. No. 3469, September 21. "Brief Stories".
- The Blessed (Blazhennye, Блаженные). Posledniye Novosti, 1930. No. 3469, September 21. "Brief Stories".
- A Shaft-Horse (Korennoi, Коренной). Posledniye Novosti, 1930. No. 3469, September 21. "Brief Stories".
- The Comet (Комета). Posledniye Novosti, 1930. No. 3469, September 21. "Brief Stories". Originally untitled.
- Rafters (Stropila, Стропила). Posledniye Novosti, 1930. No. 3539, November 20. "Brief Stories".
- Summer Say (Letny den, Летний день). Vozrozhdenye, 1926. No. 235, January 23, as "The Note-book" (Записная книжка). In a shortened version re-emerged in the "Brief Stories" cycle (Posledniye Novosti, Paris, 1930, No. 3539, November 20).
- Old Man (Dedushka, Дедушка). Posledniye Novosti, 1930. No. 3364, June 8, "Distant Things" Cycle.
- The Lodger (Postoyalets, Постоялец). Posledniye Novosti, 1930. No. 3511, November 2, "Brief Stories".
- First Class (Pervy Class, Первый класс). Posledniye Novosti, 1930. No. 3469, September 21, originally untitled. "Brief Stories".
- The Eve (Kanun, Канун). Posledniye Novosti, 1930. No. 3469, September 21, originally untitled. "Brief Stories".
- The Sister (Sestritsa, Сестрица). Posledniye Novosti, 1930. No. 3469, September 21. "Brief Stories". Judea in Spring.
- The Mask (Маска). Posledniye Novosti, 1930. No. 3511, November 2. "Brief Stories".
- Till the Bitter End (Do pobednovo kontsa, До победного конца). Posledniye Novosti, 1930. No. 3469, September 21. "Brief Stories".
- The Letter (Pismo, Письмо). Posledniye Novosti, 1930. No. 3469, September 21. "Brief Stories".
- Fairytales (Skazki, Сказки). Poslednye novosti, 1930, No. 3364, June 8. "Distant Things".
- A Pilgrim Woman (Palomnitsa, Паломница). slednye novosti, 1930, No. 2469, September 21. "Brief Stories".
- Piglets (Porosyata, Поросята). Poslednye novosti, 1930, No. 3511, November 2. "Brief Stories".

1931

- The Story of a Suitcase (Istoriya s tchemodanom, История с чемоданом). Posledniye Novosti, Paris, No. 3910, December 6, 1931.

1932

- The Lover of the Sun (Prekrasneyshaya Solntsa, Прекраснейшая Солнца). Posledniye Novosti, Paris, No. 4057, May 1, 1932. Based on the story of Petrarch's love for Laura.
- The Island of Sirens (Ostrov Siren, Остров сирен). Poslennye Novosti, Paris, 1932, No. 4085, May 29, under the title "Capri". Re-titled for the Judea in Spring (1953) collection.
- Pan Mikholsky's Waistcoat (Zhilet Pana Mikholskovo, Жилет пана Михольского). Poslennye Novosti, Paris, No. 3945, January 10. In Judea in Spring book is dated 1936.

1936

- Young and Old Age (Molodost i starost, Молодость и старость). Illustrirovannaya Rossia, Paris, 1936, under the title "About a Monkey" (Pro obezyanu, Про обезьяну). Features in the Judea in Spring collection.

== 1937–1949 ==
1937

- Caucasus (Kavkaz, Кавказ). Posledniye Novosti, #6077, Paris, 1937, November 14. Dark Alleys, 1943 edition.
- Going back to Rome (Vozvrashchayas v Rim, Возвращаясь в Рим). Poslennye Novosti, Paris, 1937, Nio.6042, October 10, with two other stories, "Prophet Osiah" and "Monsier Pirogov", under the common title "Words, Visions" (Slova, Videniya; Слова, Видения).

1938

- Dark Avenues (or Dark Alleys; Tyomnye allei, Темные аллеи). New York, 1943. The novella (and the whole book) took its title from two lines of Nikolai Ogaryov's poem: "Surrounded they were by scarlet wild roses blossoming / And dark lime-trees alley". The book's proposed alternative title (the one Bunin himself reportedly preferred) was Wild Roses (Шиповник). Dark Alleys, 1943
- A Ballad (Ballada, Баллада). Poslednie Novosti, No. 6175, February 20, 1938. Paris. Dark Alleys, 1943. Bunin regarded this story as one of his best ever. "Yet, like many of my stories of the time, I had to write it just for money. Once in Paris... having discovered my purse was empty, I decided to write something for the Latest News (Последние новости). I started remembering Russia, this house of ours which I visited regularly at all times of year... And in my mind's eye I saw the winter evening, on the eve of some kind of holiday, and... wandering Mashenka, this piece's main treasure with her beautiful nightly vigils and her wondrous language", Bunin wrote in The Origins of My Stories.
- Styopa (Стёпа). Poslednie Novosti, No. 6419, October 23, 1938, Paris. Dark Alleys, 1943. Written at Villa Beausoleil. "I just imagined myself at the riding brichka coming from brother Yevgeny’s estate which was on the border of Tulskaya and Orlovskaya guberniyas to the Boborykino station. Pouring rain. Early evening, the inn by the road and some kind of man at the doorway, using a whip to clear his top-boots. Everything else just clicked in unexpectedly, so that when starting it I couldn't guess how will it end", Bunin wrote in My Stories Origins.
- Muza (Муза) - Poslednie Novosti, No. 6426, October 30, 1938. Paris. Dark Alleys, 1943. The story was inspired by another reminiscence, that of Bunin's mother's estate in Ozerki. Only the house, though, was real in this novella; all the characters were fictional.
- The Late Hour (Pozdny tchas, Поздний час) - Poslednie Novosti, No. 6467, December 11, 1938, Paris. Dark Alleys, 1943.
- April (Aprel, Апрель). Poslednie Novosti, Paris, 1938, Nos.6203 and 6217 (March 20, April 3), under the title "Variants" (Варианты). One of the fragments of Mitya's Love novel, discarded by the author. As a finished original, featured in the 1943 edition of Dark Alleys.

1940

- Rusya (Руся). Novy Zhurnal (New Journal), #1, April–May 1942, New York. Dark Alleys, 1943. "That is a common thing with me. Once in a while would flicker through my imagination - some face, part of some landscape, a kind of weather - flicker and disappear. Occasionally it would stay, though, and start demanding my attention, asking for some development", Bunin wrote, remembering the way this novella's original image appeared.
- A Beauty (Krasavitsa, Красавица). Novoselye (House-Warming) magazine, #26, April–May 1946, New York. Dark Alleys (1946 edition).
- Half-wit (Durochka, Дурочка). Novoselye, #26, April–May 1946, New York. Dark Alleys (1946 edition).
- Wolves (Volki, Волки). Novoye Russkoye Slovo (New Russian Word), #10658, April 26, 1942. New York. Dark Alleys (1946 edition).
- Antigona (Антигона). Dark Alleys (1946 edition).
- An Emerald (Smaragd, Смарагд). Dark Alleys (1946 edition).
- Calling Cards (Vizitnye kartochki, Визитные карточки). Dark Alleys (1946 edition).
- Tanya (Таня). Dark Alleys, 1943.
- In Paris (V Parizhe, В Париже). Five stories written for Dark Alleys exclusively. Dark Alleys, 1943.
- Zoyka and Valerya (Зойка и Валерия). Russian Collection (Русский сборник), Paris, 1945. Dark Alleys (1946 edition).
- Galya Ganskaya (Галя Ганская). Novy Zhurnal, Vol. 13, 1946. New York. Dark Alleys (1946 edition). "The whole story is fictional, but the artist's prototype was Nilus", Vera Muromtseva-Bunina wrote in a letter to N.Smirnov (January 30, 1959). Pyotr Nilus was Bunin's friend in Odessa.
- Heinrich (Генрих). Dark Alleys (1946 edition). According to Vera Muromtseva-Bunina, Genrich's prototype was partly a real woman. "Max Lee, there was such a journalist and writer who wrote novels in tandem with her husband, their real surname was Kovalsky, if I remember correctly" (Rysskye Novosty, Paris, 1964, #984, April 10).
- Three Rubles (Tri rublya, Три рубля). Novoselye, New York, 1942, March. Judea in Spring.

1941

- Natalie (Натали). Novy Zhurnal, #2 1942, New York. Dark Alleys, 1943. Bunin heavily edited the original text, preparing it for the second, Paris edition. Of the initial idea, he wrote: "I asked myself: very much in the same vein as Gogol who'd come up with his travelling dead soul merchant Chichikov, what if I invent a young man who travels looking for romantic adventure? I thought it was going to be a series of funny stories. But it turned out something totally different".

1943

- Riverside Inn (Rechnoy traktir, Речной трактир). Novy Zhurnal, New York, 1945, Vol. 1. Dark Alleys (1946 edition). This novella was published in New York as a single brochure with Mstislav Dobuzhinsky's illustrations.
- Mother-in-law (Kuma, Кума). Dark Alleys (1946 edition).
- The Oaklings (Dubki, Дубки). Dark Alleys (1946 edition).
- The Beginning (Nachalo, Начало) Dark Alleys (1946 edition).

1944

- Upon a Long-Familiar Street (V odnoi znakomoi ulitse, В одной знакомой улице). Russkye Novosti, Paris, 1945, #26, November 9. Dark Alleys (1946 edition). In this newspaper issue one page was entirely devoted to Ivan Bunin's 75th birthday.
- Madrid (Мадрид). Dark Alleys (1946 edition).
- The Second Coffee Pot (Второй кофейник). Novoselye, New York, 1945, #21. Dark Alleys (1946 edition).
- Cold Autumn (Kholodnaya osen, Холодная осень). Russkye Novosty, Paris, 1945, #1, May 18. Dark Alleys (1946 edition). Inspired, arguably, by Afanasy Fet's poem (Какая холодная осень! Надень свою шаль и капот...)
- The Raven (Voron, Ворон). Russkye Novosty, Paris, 1945, #33, December 28. Dark Alleys (1946 edition). Soviet critic A. Tarasenkov in a foreword to the Selected Bunin (ГИХЛ, 1956, p. 20) mentioned this novella among Bunin's best work written in emigration. Later, Thomas Bradly, in his introduction to Bunin's The Gentleman from San Francisco and Other Stories (1963, New York, Washington, Square Press, XIX, p. 264) argued that the writer's best novellas of the 1930s and 1940s were Dark Alleys and The Raven.
- The Steamer Saratov (Parokhod Saratov, Пароход Саратов). Dark Alleys (1946 edition).
- The Camargue (Камарг). Dark Alleys (1946 edition).
- One Hundred Rupees (Sto rupiy, Сто рупий). Dark Alleys (1946 edition).
- The chapel (Tchasovnya, Часовня). Bothare previously unpublished. Dark Alleys (1946 edition).
- Revenge (Mest, Месть). Novy Zhurnal, New York, 1946, #12. Dark Alleys (1946 edition).
- Pure Monday (Tchisty ponedelnik, Чистый Понедельник). Novy Zhurnal, New York, 1945, Vol. 10. Dark Alleys (1946 edition). Vera Muromtseva-Bunina recalled having found a scrap of paper (after one of her husband's sleepless nights) on which he wrote: "I thank you, God, for enabling me to write 'Pure Monday'". (Letter to N.P. Smirnov, January 29, 1959). "This novella Ivan Alekseevich rated as his best ever," she wrote in a letter to .L. Vyacheslavov on September 19, 1960.
- Mistral (Мистраль). Vstrecha (The Meeting) magazine, Paris, 1945, July. Judea in Spring collection.
- The Memorable Ball (Pamyatny bal, Памятный бал). Russkiye Novosti, Paris, 1947, January 3. Judea in Spring.

1945

- The Swing (Katcheli, Качели). Russkye Novosty, Paris, 1945, #26, November 9. Dark Alleys (1946 edition).

1946

- Judea in Spring (Vesnoi v Iudeye, Весной в Иудее). Russkye Novosty. Paris, 1946, #49. April 19. This novella gave its title to a Bunin's last in-his-lifetime collection, published in New York in 1953.
- The Huntsman (Lovtchy, Ловчий). Judea in Spring.

1947

- The Midday Heat (Poludenny zhar, Полуденный жар). Judea in Spring.

1949

- A Night Stay (Notchleg, Ночлег). Judea in Spring.
- "On a Night Like This" ("V takuyu notch", "В такую ночь"). Novoselye, New York, 1950, No. 42-44. Judea in Spring.
- Alupka (Алупка). Judea in Spring
- In the Alps (V Alpakh, В Альпах). Novoselye, New York, 1950, No. 42-44. Judea in Spring
- The Legend (Legenda, Легенда). Judea in Spring
- "Un Petit Accident". Novoselye, New York, 1950, No. 42-44. Judea in Spring
