= Meliton (Ivan Bunin) =

- Short story by Ivan Bunin
- Original title: Мелитон
- Country: Russia
- Language: Russian

Publication
- Publication date: 1901

Meliton is a novella by Nobel Prize-winning Russian author Ivan Bunin. Dated as "1900-1930" in The Complete Bunin (Petropolis, Berlin, 1935; Moscow, 1965), it was first published in the 1901 No.7 (July) issue of Saint Petersburg magazine Zhurnal Dlya Vsekh (Journal For Everyone), originally under the title "Skete" (Скит). While working upon the Primal Love (Начальная любовь) compilation, Bunin changed the story's title into "Meliton" (after its main character's first name). In its final version the novella appeared in the July 6, 1930, No.3392 issue of the Paris-based Poslednye Novosti newspaper.

== History ==
"Skete" was the first piece of prose Ivan Bunin published in the Journal for Everyone magazine, where his poetry was appearing regularly since 1898.

Upon receiving the text, the magazine's editor Viktor Mirolyubov wrote in a letter dated May 29, 1901: "Thank you very much, dear Ivan Alekseevich, for "Skete". I liked it a lot... Whenever you put just one living person into this artistic frame of nature pictures, the nature itself gets so much livelier." Bunin replied: "I am glad you liked "Skete". As for the pictures of nature which, as far as I can see, you seem to feel I am too much devoted to, this is not exactly the case, for I never depict 'naked' nature, in a protocol way, as it were. What I am concerned with is beauty, no matter what this beauty is attributed to; or, alternatively, what I try to do is transport the reader part of my soul with these [pictures of] nature..."

=== Missing parts ===
The final part of the story suffered from censorship. In early July 1901 Bunin enquired in a letter to Mirolyubov: "I haven't found the final three lines in [the publication of] "Skete". Besides, the word выпукло (bulgingly) is missing (when it comes to the rooster bit). Mirolyubov replied: "The last three lines from "Skete" have been dropped by the censors for some reason (Nikolay Elagin was responsible). As for the word 'bulgingly', I pity for it more than you even, if you only knew how I fought it for." In all the next versions Bunin reinstated the missing word, but not the three lines that had been crossed out by censor. What exactly they were remained unknown for not a single manuscript or a proof-reader's copy of the story survived.

All through his later years Bunin, rather than reinstating the censure-dropped bits, was busy stripping his prose of details he deemed superfluous. Modern researchers (Oleg Mikhailov among them) point to the fact that in emigration, while preparing his earlier works for new publications, he was cutting off fragments dealing with political and social context of the times those stories were written in, aiming apparently at erasing the 'period' aspect of them and going for more universal, time-unrelated appeal. Meliton provides a telling example of this. In 1930 Bunin extracted from the story half a page of the original text, relating to the young protagonist's telling how he went abroad trying to evade this horrible thing, the Russian autumn: "Only occasionally did Russia came back to my mind and in those moments it seemed such a remote, out of the way place, that I was imagining Gostomysl, drevlyane, tatarschina... How dark and wet autumn is there!" The young man goes on to paint the bleak picture of autumnal landscapes of stripped-bare rural Russia, exclaiming: "And what an immense patience is needed there to just live this infinite autumn through!.." The next paragraph, dealing with the protagonist's return to Russia (the country now suffering of hunger) to witness the early winter approaching, was cut too, the story resuming with: "The last time I visited Meliton was at one point of the last winter."
