= The Bishop (short story) =

- Short story by Anton Chekhov
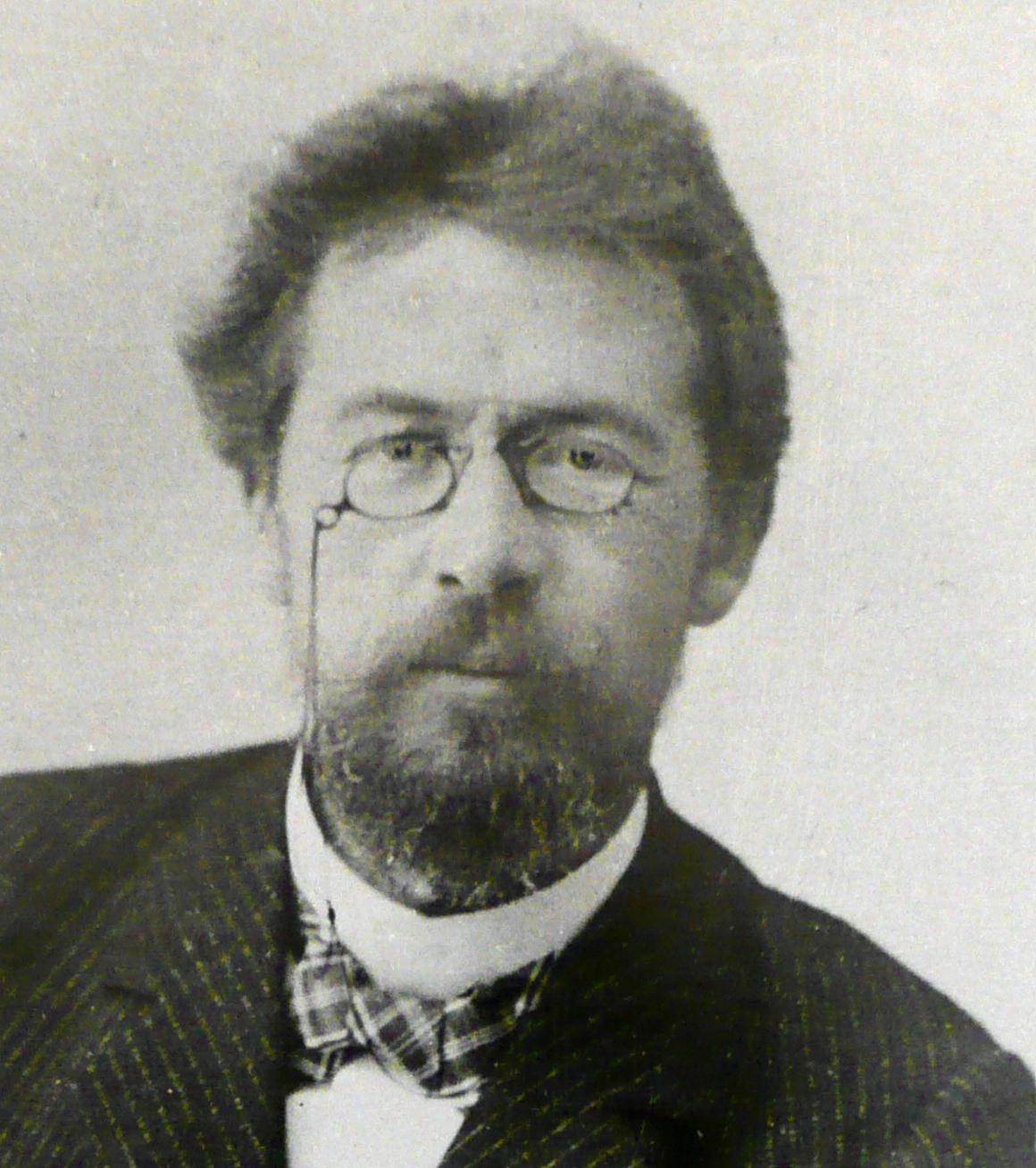
- Chekhov in 1901
- Original title: Архиерей
- Country: Russia
- Language: Russian

Publication
- Published in: Zhurnal Dlya Vsekh (1902)
- Publisher: Adolf Marks (1903, 1906)
- Publication date: April 1902

"The Bishop" (Russian: Архиерей, romanized: Arkhiyerei) is a 1902 short story by Anton Chekhov, first published in the April 1902 issue of Zhurnal Dlya Vsekh. The story, telling about the last days of a terminally ill priest, in many ways reflects the psychological state of the author, who was at the time full of premonitions of his own inevitable demise, and in that respect is considered to be partly autobiographical.

== Publication ==
Chekhov promised to Viktor Mirolyubov to write a story for Zhurnal Dlya Vsekh in a December 1899 letter. But he set to work upon it much later, judging by his 16 March 1901 letter to Olga Knipper, in which he wrote: "Now I am writing a story called 'The Bishop', based upon a plotline that had been sitting in my head for some fifteen years." In July of that year Mirolyubov reminded Chekhov about his old promise to the journal's subscribers. Chekhov in a 3 August letter assured him that the piece was in the pipeline, but in October had to apologise for some further delays. He sent the story to the magazine only on 20 February 1902 with apologies, explaining the delay with his deteriorating health, and with a kind of warning, that he'd be "challenging the censors for every single word" and won't let the badly mangled text published. There were indeed severe censorial cuts, not to mention gaping proofreader's blunders, which took Chekhov another month to fix. Finally, "The Bishop" was published in the No.4, April 1902 issue of Zhurnal Dlya Vsekh.

In a slightly revised version, it was included into Volume 12 of the 1903, second edition the Collected Works by A.P. Chekhov, published by Adolf Marks. It then appeared in Volume 11 of the posthumous, 1906 third edition.

== Plot ==
Pyotr, the Bishop at the Staro-Petrovski Convent feels weak and unwell. During the evening service, on the eve of Palm Sunday, while distributing the pussy willow shoots, he sees in the crowd a woman who looks like his mother whom he had not seen for nine years. For no particular reason tears start flowing from his eyes... Tired and in a kind of haze, he returns to his monastery bedroom, then learns from Father Sysoi, a visiting monk, that his mother indeed had come to visit him, bringing with her Katya, an eight-year old niece. This brings him great joy, he spends the night in reveries... But he is unable to sleep also because his conditions worsens, and he seems to be in a fever.

Meeting the mother and a child, Pyotr feels happy and elated, but strange feeling creeps in: it seems as if the old woman is too timid, too respectful in his presence, while feeling apparently totally relaxed and merry while chatting with the old Sysoi. During the next several days Pyotr is very busy: he officiates at the cathedral in the city, goes to the diocesan bishop's, then sees a general's wife who is very ill... And increasingly all these things he is engaged in, seem to him increasingly insignificant. Succumbing to the illness, he gets more and more annoyed with the people around him, none of whom he feels able to talk to. He is overcome with an irrational longing to be abroad.

Another sleepless night passes by. In the morning Pyotr begins to have hemorrhage from the bowels. Sysoi rushes for a doctor, who recognizes typhoid. After an hour of bleeding, Pyotr grows thin and pale, feeling "...as if everything that had occurred before this had been left far, far behind, and would never happen again." "My little son, why do you look like this?" his frightened mother keeps repeating, but he is unable to gives her an answer. Endless hours drag slowly by. On the Saturday morning, a day before Easter Sunday, Pyotr dies.

A month later a new bishop arrives in the town and everybody forgets about the deceased one. His mother departs to a remote little town to live with her son-in-law. Occasionally, when "...she goes out at night to bring her cow in and meets other women at the pasture, [she] begins talking of her children and her grandchildren, and says that she had a son a bishop, and this she says timidly, afraid that she may not be believed... And, indeed, there are some who do not believe her."

== Background ==
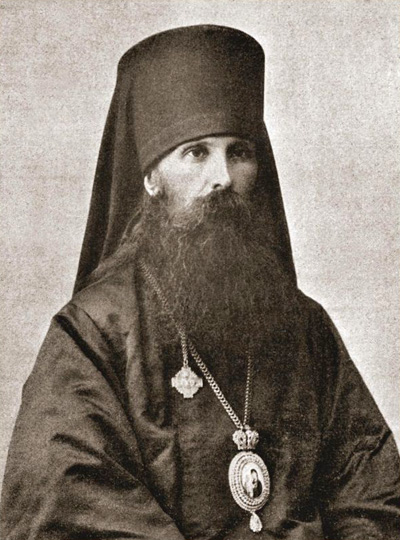
The Yalta Bishop Mikhail Gribanovsky, who died in 1898 aged 41, is considered to be the prototype of the story's main character.

S.N. Shchyukin (Note: Sergey Nikolayevich Shchyukin (1871-1931) was a Yalta priest and the dukhovnik of Chekhov whom he met for the first time in January 1899. He also published short stories under the pseudonym Voskresenski. His memoirs on Chekhov were published in the October 1911 issue of Russkaya Mysl and later included into the 1960 Chekhov Remembered compilation. Shchyukin sent Chekhov the book he mentioned on 24 April 1899.) in his memoirs remembers one particular episode in early 1899 which most certainly gave Chekhov an original idea for the story. "One day, when he was still living in his dacha at Ilovayskoye, A.P. returned from the city quite animated. He had seen at a photographer's a photo of Mikhail, the Bishop of Tavria. (Note: Bishop Mikhail Gribanovsky (1856-1898) was a well-known religious author of the time. There is one detail, though: Bishop Pyotr comes from a peasant family, while Bishop Mikhail's ancestors in many generations were priests.) The portrait impressed him a lot, he bought it and spent some time examining it at home... The Bishop was not an old man, but he suffered from severe case of consumption. On the photo he was with his old mother... He had this spirited, intelligent, very sad face of a suffering man... Anton Pavlovich enquired a lot about Bishop Mikhail, and later I sent him a book by the latter, called Above the Gospels."

Shchyukin continued: "Once [Anton Pavlovich] told me. 'Now, here's a fine idea for a short story. The Bishop conducts the morning service on Maundy Thursday. He is ill. The church is overcrowded. The choir sings. The Bishop reads the Passion of Jesus. He greatly emphasizes with the text, he feels pity for Christ, for the people, for himself. Then he feels as if some burden descends upon him, realizes that he might be dying, that he may die any moment now. This feeling of his, either through the tone of his voice, the general tension in the atmosphere, or by some other unseen, unfathomable ways, is transported to the clergymen around him, then to the people praying. Feeling his own demise approaching, the Bishops starts to cry, and the whole of the church cries with him. Everybody is transfixed with this touch of inevitable death."

Shchyukin's version of the story's history was strongly supported by Ivan Bunin.

According to Mikhail Chekhov, the prototype for the story's main hero was Stepan Alexeyevich Petrov, who lived on the Sadovo-Kudrinskaya street in Moscow. Once a Moscow University philology faculty student, he suddenly became a monk and soon made quite a career in theology. "Father Sergiy, as he became known, often visited Anton Pavlovich in Yalta, mostly at the latter's dacha, in Yautka," according to Mikhail Chekhov. Later literary historians put this assumption to doubt. Chekhov did correspond with Father Sergiy in 1897—1900 and 1902—1904, but they met for the first time apparently only in spring 1904.

It was only after Chekhov's death, and with the publication of his correspondence, that it became clear how many personal thoughts and autobiographical details went into the main character. The premonition of death, feelings of loneliness in provincial desolation, anger at countless petty things which hindered his work, were the main motives of his 1899—1902 Yalta letters. He complained of the necessity to have tea again and again ("...guests spent more than an hour with me now, then asked for tea, now went to put the samovar on," 30 October 1899, to Olga Knipper) and the endless flow of guests "…among whom there is no single person to whom I could talk and unburden my heart" (Pyotr's words in the story); of being "sick and lonely," and feeling "as if in exile." "First I thought I had typhoid, now I see it's another thing," he informed Knipper on 6 September 1901, then two month later: "So now I keep thinking: what about going abroad?". Several times he mentioned thinking of leaving Yalta and just go away, "to roam freely the world," another idea he shared with Bishop Pyotr.

== Reception ==
The story garnered generally positive reviews in the contemporary Russian press. A Birzhevye Vedomosti reviewer (signed A.I., in 14 May 1902, No. 129 issue) called the story "one of the most beautiful and graceful" in the Chekov collection. Several critics (including A.Elf in Vostochnoye Obozreniye) praised the story both for its artistic merits and the way it provided a detailed, insightful picture of a Russian clergyman's life. On 14 October Mirolyubov wrote to Chekhov: "I've been to Yasnaya Polyana, the Old Man [Leo Tolstoy] expressed delight with The Bishop, and asked after your health."

Ivan Bunin wrote that the story was "written wonderfully. Only somebody who deals in writing and knows there hellish torture can understand all the beauty of this thing."
