= Novosti =

Novosti means news in some Slavic languages, and so is the name of some news organizations and publications. It may refer to:

- RIA Novosti, Russian state-owned news agency
- Novosti AD, Serbian publishing company
  - Večernje novosti (lit. Evening News), Serbian daily established in 1953 and published by the above company
- Novosti (Croatia), Croatian weekly published by the Serb National Council since 1999
- Moskovskiye Novosti (lit. Moscow News), defunct Russian daily which was published 1980–2008
- Posledniye Novosti, (lit. Latest News), historic Russian émigré daily published in Paris 1920–1940
- Sportske novosti (lit. Sports News), Croatian sports daily established in 1945
  - Sportske novosti awards, the annual awards for highest achievements in Croatian sports
