= Antonovka =

Apple cultivar

Malus pumila 'Antonovka'
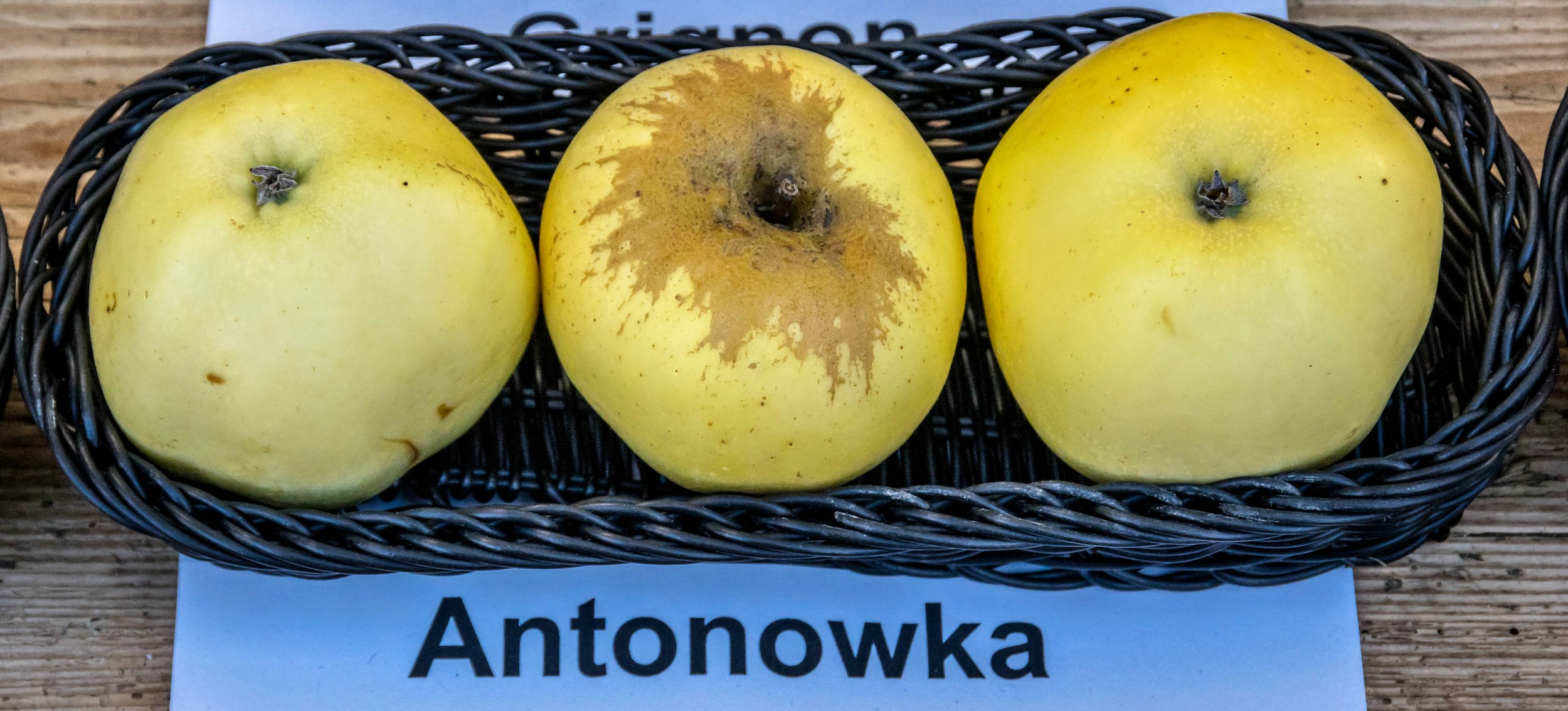
- Antonovka apples
- Species: Malus pumila
- Hybrid parentage: Seems unknown
- Cultivar: 'Antonovka'
- Origin: Kursk Oblast, Russia

Antonovka (Russian: Антоновка, Polish: Antonówka) is a group of late-fall or early-winter apple cultivars with a strong acid flavor that have been popular in Russia, including during Tsarist and Soviet times, as well as in Poland and Belarus. The most popular Russian variety is the Common Antonovka (Антоновка обыкновенная), from which other cultivars are derived.

== Cultivar of Antonovka ==
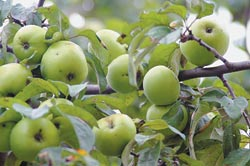
Antonovka apples

Antonovka is a cultivar of vernacular selection, which began to spread from the region of Kursk in Russia during the 19th century. While the fruit-bearing trees have not received a wide degree of recognition outside the former Soviet Union, many nurseries do use Antonovka rootstocks, since they impart a degree of winter-hardiness to the grafted varieties.

Several varieties of Antonovka were introduced by pioneer Russian naturalist and plant breeder Ivan Michurin at his experimental orchard in the Tambov Oblast, in particular, One and half pound antonovka notable for the size of the fruit.

== Polish varieties ==
Poland has two varieties: Antonówka Zwykła (same, as in Russia) and Antonówka Biała also known as Śmietankowa (Antonówka White or Creamy) with considerably larger and whiter fruit ripening in late September, but also a shorter shelf life.

== Aia Ilu ==
The Antonovka is a parent to Aia Ilu.

== Hardiness ==
The popularity of the Antonovka tree is enhanced by its ability to sustain long harsh winters, typical in many regions of Eastern Europe and Russia. It is further popular for its superior fruit preservation qualities and longevity. These qualities made the Russian variety especially popular among the dacha owners, and it remains widely grown at dachas in many post-Soviet states, where it is often called "the people's apple" (народное яблоко). Extremely tolerant of cold weather, and because it produces a single, deep taproot (unusual among apple trees), Antonovka is propagated for use as a rootstock. An Antonovka rootstock provides a cold-hardy (to −45 °C), well-anchored, vigorous, standard-sized tree.

== Uses ==
Due to the relatively low ratio of sugars in the fruit, Antonovka apples are especially well-suited for apple pies and late apple wine. The taste of the wine is noticeably lighter than wine from sweeter cultivars. In Poland, Antonówka is used mostly for apple preserves.

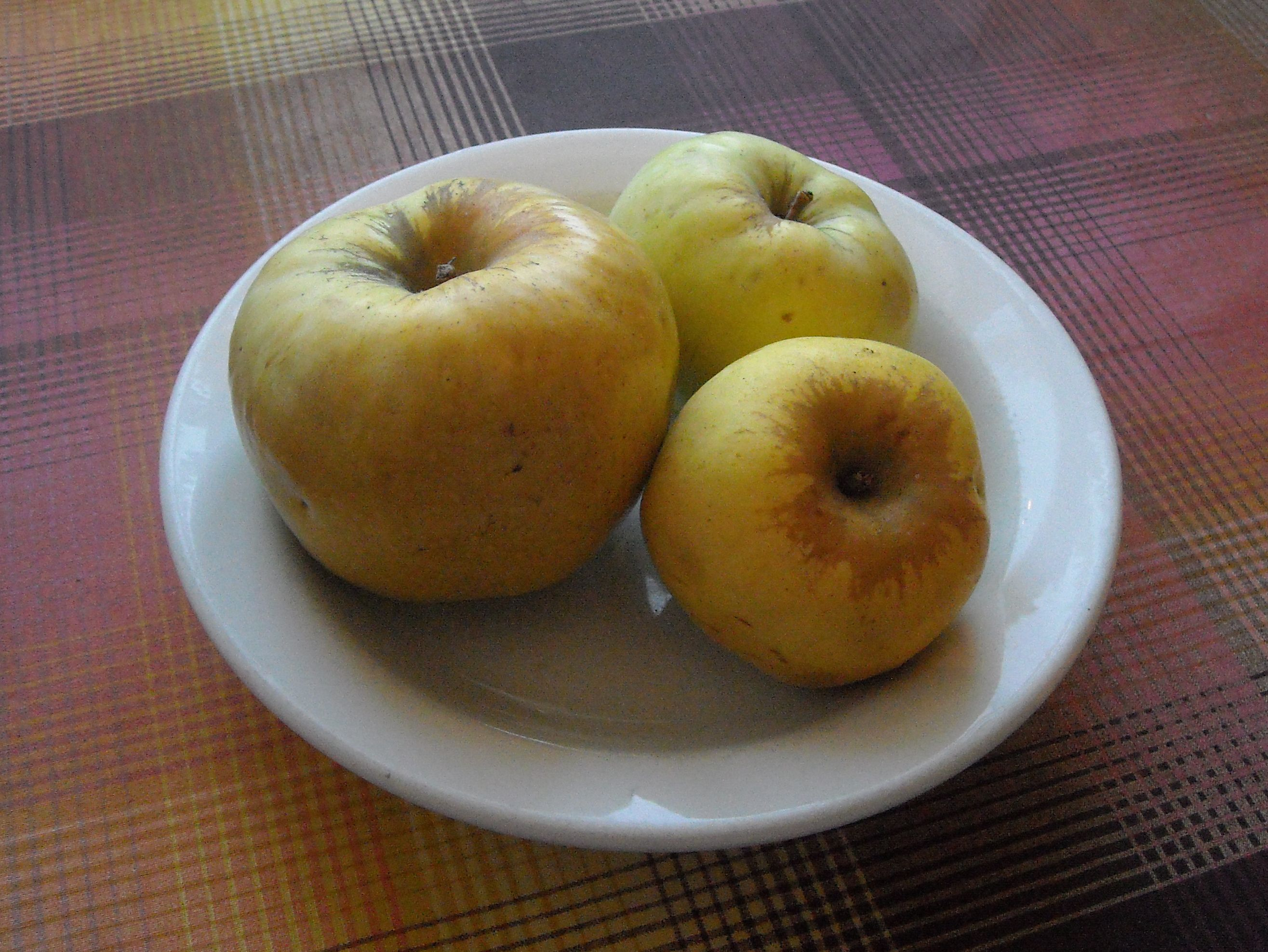
Kursk Antonovka

== In popular culture ==
Ivan Bunin's early short story, "Antonov Apples" (1900), is a kind of ode to this apple cultivar as a metaphor for the departing world of the Russian landed gentry.

On August 19, 2008 a monument to the Antonovka apple was unveiled in Kursk. The sculpture was by Vyacheslav Klykov, and it has a diameter of 1.5 meters.

== See also ==
- List of apple cultivars
