= Aia Ilu =

Apple cultivar

Malus pumila 'Aia Ilu'
- Species: Malus pumila
- Hybrid parentage: Antonovka x ?
- Cultivar: 'Aia Ilu'
- Origin: , Estonia

Aia Ilu (Garden Beauty in English) is a cultivar of domesticated apple, from Estonia, first developed in 1946 by Aleksander Siimon.

== Characteristics ==
The Aia Ilu has large apples, weighing from 250 to 300 grams. It is juicy, bittersweet, and has a weak aroma. The Aia Ilu is grown in nurseries, but is not widely propagated.

== Pests ==
The Aia Ilu has low scab resistance and is resistant to powdery mildew.
