= Antonovka Apples =

"Antonov Apples"
- Short story by Ivan Bunin
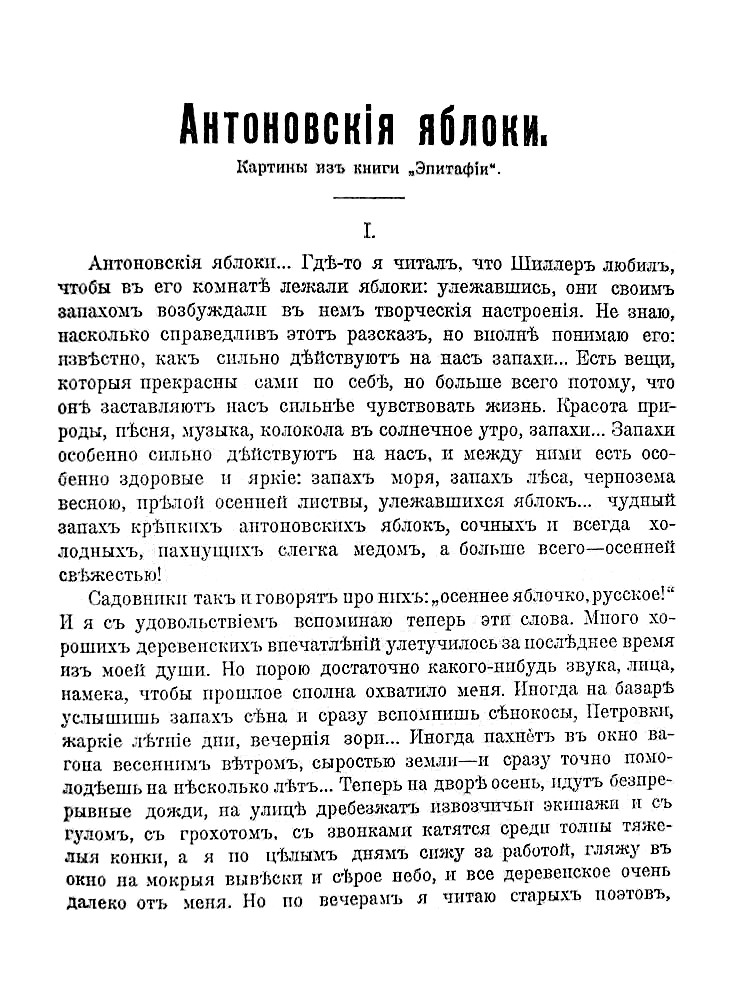
- Original title: Антоновские яблоки
- Country: Russia
- Language: Russian

Publication
- Publisher: Zhiznh magazine Saint Petersburg
- Publication date: 1900

"Antonovka Apples" (Russian: Антоновские яблоки, romanized: Antonovskiye Yabloki, occasionally referred to as The Apple Fragrance) is a short story by Nobel Prize-winning Russian author Ivan Bunin, written in 1900 and published the same year in the October issue of the Saint Petersburg Zhiznh (Life) magazine, subtitled "Sketches from the Epitaph book".

== Background ==
Scholars trace the novella's origins to Ivan Bunin's August 14, 1891, letter to Varvara Pashchenko, the woman he was passionately in love with at the time, in which he spoke of his irrational love of the early autumn. Mentioning the smell of Antonov apples in the garden, Bunin confessed: "In the days like these not only does my hatred towards the times of serfdom go away, but I begin unwillingly to poeticise those times... Really, I wouldn't have minded spending at least some time as an old-time land-owner." Nine years later, these feelings materialised in the "Antonov apples" novella, one of his best-known early works. According to Vera Muromtseva-Bunina, Bunin's relative A.I.Pusheshnikov served as a prototype for the story's main character Arseny Semyonovich.

Bunin continued to curtail the original text all through his lifetime. Preparing the novella for The Passage (Перевал) collection, he omitted the whole page (with the reference to Friedrich Schiller's observation as to the apples' aroma being good for a room's general atmosphere). More drastic cuts were made prior to the first Complete series in 1915 and then at the time of Primal Love publication in 1921.

== Critical reception ==
"Antonov apples" story received mixed reviews. Within a month of its publication Maxim Gorky wrote in a letter addressed to Bunin: "Thank you for the 'Apples'. Those were good. Here Ivan Bunin like a young God sang. Beautiful, juicy and soulful." Yet it was Gorky who denounced Ignaty Potapenko's sharp criticism in the Rossiya newspaper (November 10, 1900, #556), calling the review (signed 'The Stranger') "spiteful, stupid and pathetic". Brother Yuli Bunin, remembering the Moscow Wednesday (Среда) literary gatherings and mentioning criticism the writer had to confront there, wrote: "Some, speaking favourably of Antonov Apples artistic merits, rebuked him for his alleged sympathy for the old-time ways of rural life."

In 1906 Aleksandr Kuprin parodied Antonov Apples in a piece called "I.A. Bunin. The Milk-cap Pies" (И.А.Бунин. Пироги с груздями).

Decades on, both the Soviet and the Russian literary scholars regarded the story as one of the highlights of Ivan Bunin's early career. In 1965 Oleg Mikhailov described it as "the masterpiece", marked by "precise detalisation, concise artistry and daring metaphors... all of which go the whole way to re-create fragrances and spectres of the old-time Russia's rural life."
