= In August =

"In the August"
- Short story by Ivan Bunin
- Original title: В августе
- Country: Russia
- Language: Russian

Publication
- Published in: Russkaya mysl
- Publication date: 1901

In The August was a short story by a Nobel Prize-winning Russian author Ivan Bunin first published in Russkaya mysl 1901, #8, August issue.

== History ==
Bunin was working upon the story for a long time. After the magazine publication he prepared the text for Pereval anthology, and in it cut several fragments, notably description of a provincial town at noon. The story contained autobiographical elements. A visit to Tolstoyans, a walk over an old Malorossia town, in which Poltava can easily be guessed, a romantic relations with a girl. Tolstoyans described here had their prototypes; Pavlovsky mentioned there was Drozhin, a village teacher who died in 1892 after serving in a disciplinarian battalion for his refusal to serve in the army (as describe in The Life of Bunin, p. 85)

Several scenes and details of the story Bunin used in Chapter 27 of Part V of The Life of Arseniev.
