= Posledniye Novosti =

Russian newspaper

Posledniye Novosti (Russian: Последние новости, 'Latest News') was a Russian White émigré daily newspaper, organ of the Constitutional Democratic Party (Cadets). It was published in Paris from April 1920 to July 1940. Its editor was Pavel Milyukov.
