= Viktor Mirolyubov =

Russian opera singer (1860–1939)

Viktor Sergeyevich Mirolyubov
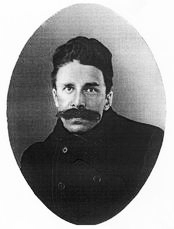
- Born: Виктор Сергеевич Миролюбов; 22 January 1860; Moscow, Russian Empire
- Died: 26 October 1939 (aged 79); Leningrad, USSR
- Occupations: editor, publisher, opera singer
- Years active: 1890s - 1920s

Viktor Sergeyevich Mirolyubov (Russian: Виктор Серге́евич Миролюбов, 22 January 1860, in Moscow, Russian Empire – 26 October 1939, in Leningrad, USSR) was a Russian journalist, editor and publisher. Having started out as an opera singer (who up until 1897 performed, as V.Mirov, at the Bolshoi Theatre), he became widely known for his work as a head of Zhurnal Dlya Vsekh (Journal for Everyone, 1898–1906), originally a minor publication which he then bought out to turn into one of the leading literary Russian magazines of the time. In 1901 Mirolyubov became a co-founder (along with Dmitry Merezhkovsky and Zinaida Gippius among others) of the Religious-Philosophic Meetings (1901–1903).

After the 1917 Revolution Viktor Mirolyubov, encouraged and supported by Maxim Gorky (whom he became friends with in the early 1900s, while working for Znanie Publishers), remained in the Soviet Russia. He worked as an editor, later librarian, eventually became unemployed and died in poverty in 1939.

== See also ==
- Znanie Publishers
