= Zhurnal Dlya Vsekh =

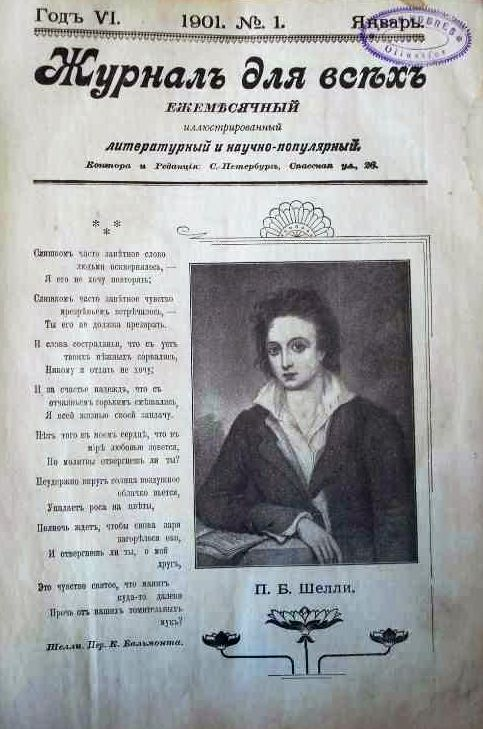
- 1901, No.1 issue
- Editor: Viktor Mirolyubov
- Frequency: Monthly
- Circulation: 80 thousand (1903)
- Founded: 1859
- Final issue: 1866
- Based in: Saint Petersburg, Russian Empire
- Language: Russian

Zhurnal Dlya Vsekh (Russian: Журнал для всех, Journal For Everybody) was a Russian monthly magazine published in Saint-Petersburg in 1895–1906. Concentrating on literature and poetry, it also had popular science, history and travel sections. The unusually low price (just one ruble for a year's subscription) contributed to its popularity.

Viktor Mirolyubov who came to Zhurnal Dlya Vsekh in 1898 as its publisher and editor gathered around himself an impressive team of regular contributors, including Anton Chekhov, Maxim Gorky, Alexander Kuprin, Leonid Andreyev, Vikenty Veresayev, Yevgeny Chirikov, Konstantin Balmont and Alexander Khakhanov. By 1903 the magazine's circulation had raised to 80 thousand. Zhurnal Dlya Vsekh was closed by the Russian authorities in autumn 1906, after it published several reports on the industrial unrest throughout Russia.

In 1922-1925 Krasny Zhurnal Dlya Vsekh was published in Leningrad. The 1928-founded magazine Zhurnal Dlya Vsekh in 1930 changed its name to Proletarsky Avangard.
