= Anton Chekhov bibliography =

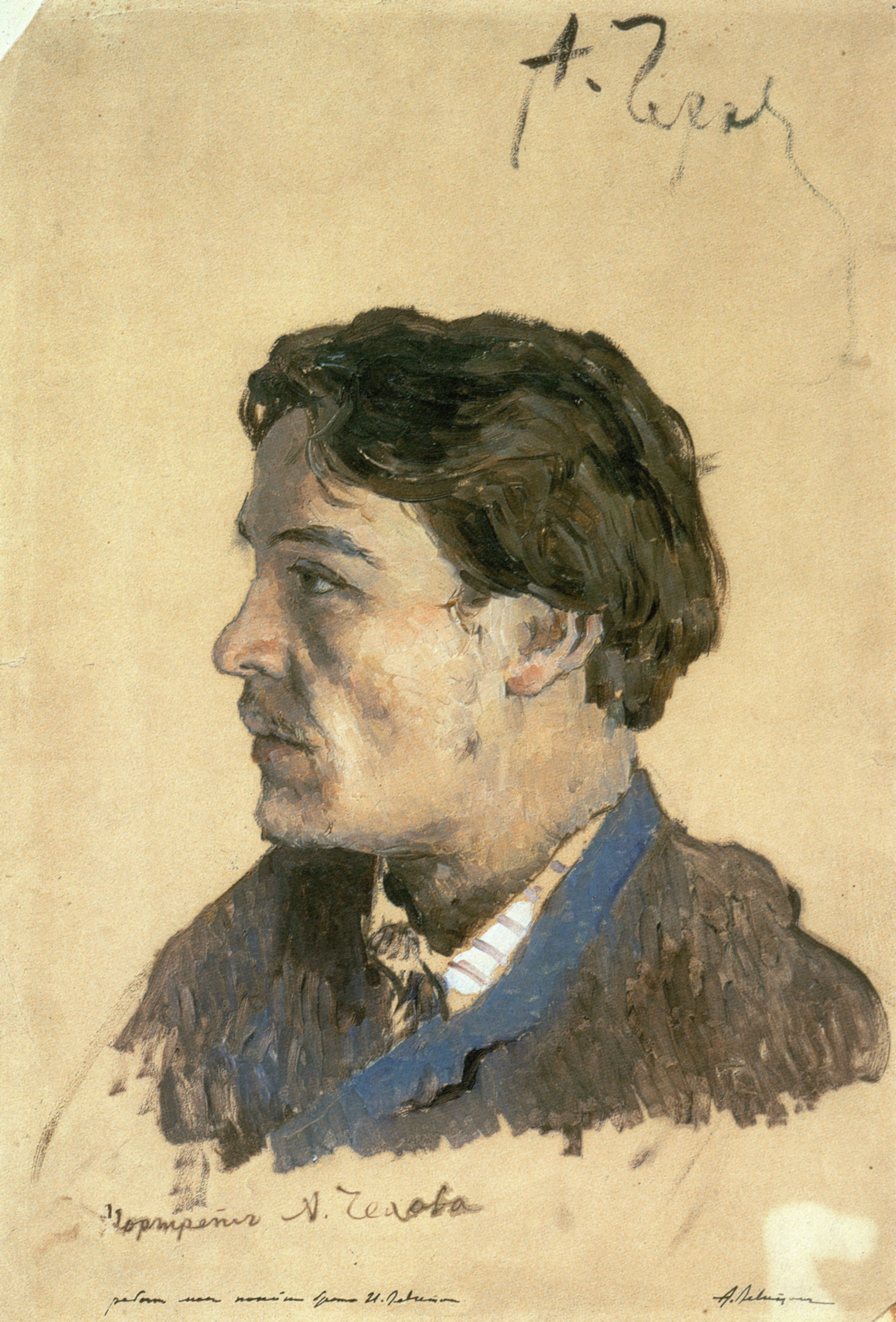
Portrait of Chekhov by Isaak Levitan, 1886

Anton Chekhov was a Russian playwright and short-story writer who is considered to be among the greatest writers of short fiction in history. He wrote hundreds of short stories, one novel, and seven full-length plays.

== Plays ==
=== Four-act plays ===
- Untitled Play (Пьеса без названия, discovered 19 years after the author's death in manuscript form with title page missing; most commonly known as Platonov in English; 1878)—adapted in English by Michael Frayn as Wild Honey (1984)
- Ivanov (Иванов, 1887)—a play in four acts
- The Wood Demon (Леший, 1889)—a comedy in four acts; eight years after the play was published Chekhov returned to the work and extensively revised it into Uncle Vanya (see below)
- The Seagull (Чайка, 1896)—a comedy in four acts
- Uncle Vanya (Дядя Ваня, 1899)—scenes from country life in four acts; based on The Wood Demon
- Three Sisters (Три сестры, 1901)—a drama in four acts
- The Cherry Orchard (Вишнёвый сад, 1904)—a comedy in four acts

=== One-act plays ===
- On the High Road (На большой дороге, 1884)—a dramatic study in one act
- On the Harmful Effects of Tobacco (О вреде табака; 1886, 1902)—a monologue in one act
- Swansong (Лебединая песня, 1887)—a dramatic study in one act
- The Bear or The Boor (Медведь, 1888)—a farce in one act
- A Marriage Proposal (Предложение, c. 1889)—a farce in one act
- A Tragedian in Spite of Himself or A Reluctant Tragic Hero (Трагик поневоле, 1889)—a farce in one act
- The Wedding (Свадьба, 1889)—a play in one act
- Tatiana Repina (Татьяна Репина, 1889)—a drama in one act
- The Night before the Trial (Ночь перед судом, the 1890s)—a play in one act; sometimes considered unfinished
- The Festivities or The Anniversary (Юбилей, 1891)—a farce in one act

=== Dialogues and parodies ===
- The Fool, or The Retired Sea Captain (Дура, или Капитан в отставке, 1883)
- Unclean Tragedians and Leprous Playwrights (Нечистые трагики и прокажённые драматурги, 1884)
- A Young Man (Молодой человек, 1884)
- An Ideal Examination (Идеальный экзамен, 1884)
- Chaos-Vile in Rome (Кавардак в Риме, 1884)
- A Mouth as Big as All Outdoors (Язык до Киева доведет, 1884)
- Honorable Townsfolk (Господа обыватели, 1884)
- At the Sickbed (У постели больного, 1884)
- The Case of the Year 1884 (Дело о 1884 годе, 1885)
- A Drama (Драма, 1886)
- In the Spring: Cat's Monologue (Весной: Сцена-монолог, 1887)
- Before the Eclipse (Перед затмением, 1887)
- A Forced Declaration (Вынужденное заявление, 1889)

== Novel ==
- The Shooting Party (Драма на охоте, 1884)

== Novellas ==
- The Unnecessary Victory (Ненужная победа, 1882)
- The Steppe (Степь, 1888)
- The Duel (Дуэль, 1891)
- The Story of an Unknown Man (Рассказ неизвестного человека, 1893)
- Three Years (Три года, 1895)
- My Life (Моя жизнь, 1896)

== Novelettes ==
- Late-Blooming Flowers (Цветы запоздалые, 1882)
- A Living Chattel (Живой товар, 1882)
- Lights (Огни, 1888)
- The Party (Именины, 1888)
- A Dreary Story (Скучная история, 1889)
- Ward No. 6 (Палата No. 6, 1892)
- The Wife (Жена, 1892)
- The Black Monk (Чёрный монах, 1894)
- A Woman's Kingdom (Бабье царство, 1894)
- Murder (Убийство, 1895)
- Peasants (Мужики, 1897)
- In the Ravine (В овраге, 1900)

== Short-story collections ==
Collections of stories that Chekhov prepared for publication.

=== The Prank (Шалость, 1882) (Note: Intended for publication in 1882, but was subsequently abandoned. First published by New York Review Books in 2015, in an English translation.) ===
List
- "Artists' Wives" (Жены артистов)
- "Papa" (Папаша)
- "St. Peter's Day" (Петров день)
- "Chase Two Rabbits, Catch None" (За двумя зайцами погонишься, ни одного не поймаешь)
- "A Confession, or, Olya, Zhenya, Zoya" (Исповедь, или Оля, Женя, Зоя)
- "A Sinner from Toledo" (Грешник из Толедо)
- "The Temperaments" (Темпераменты)
- "Flying Islands" (Летающие острова)
- "Before the Wedding" (Перед свадьбой)
- "A Letter to a Learned Neighbor" (Письмо к ученому соседу)
- "In the Train Car" (В вагоне)
- "1,001 Passions, or, A Dreadful Night" (Тысяча одна страсть, или Страшная ночь)

=== The Tales of Melpomene (Сказки Мельпомены, 1884) ===
List
- "He and She" (Он и она)
- "The Baron" (Барон)
- "Revenge" (Месть)
- "Two Scandals" (Два скандала)
- "Artists' Wives" (Жены артистов)
- "A Tragic Actor" (Трагик)

=== Motley Stories (Пёстрые рассказы, 1886) ===
List
- (*) Removed from the second edition. (Note: Subsequent editions also included the following stories: "The First-class Passenger" (Пассажир 1-го класса); "In a Strange Land" (На чужбине); "Zinotchka" (Зиночка); "A Drama" (Драма); "The Objet d'Art" (Произведение искусства); "A Transgression" (Беззаконие); "The Dependents" (Нахлебники))
- "Horse and Quivering Doe"* (Конь и трепетная лань)
- "The Virtuous Clerk"* (Добродетельный кабатчик)
- "The Daughter of Albion" (Дочь Альбиона)
- "Once a Year" (Раз в год)
- "The Patriot"* (Патриот своего отечества)
- "The Retired Slave" (Отставной раб)
- "The Death of a Government Clerk" (Смерть чиновника)
- "The Heroic Lady"* (Герой-барыня)
- "On a Dark Night"* (Тёмною ночью)
- "The Huntsman" (Егерь)
- "The Decoration" (Орден)
- "The Willow-Tree"* (Верба)
- "Sleepy Follies"* (Сонная одурь)
- "An Incident at Law"* (Случай из судебной практики)
- "Sentimentality"* (Размазня)
- "A Living Chronology" (Живая хронология)
- "The Head of the Family"* (Отец семейства)
- "Murder Will Out" (Шило в мешке)
- "The Cook's Wedding" (Кухарка женится)
- "On a Nail"* (На гвозде)
- "Both are Better"* (Оба лучше)
- "The Last Mohican" (Последняя могиканша)
- "A Man of Ideas" (Мыслитель)
- "Small Fry" (Мелюзга)
- "A Malefactor" (Злоумышленник)
- "A Dead Body" (Мёртвое тело)
- "Malingerers"* (Симулянты)
- "The Tutor"* (Репетитор)
- "A Man and a Dog Converse"* (Разговор человека с собакой)
- "What Is To Be Done?"* (Надлежащие меры)
- "Sorrow" (Горе)
- "The Thief"* (Вор)
- "The Fish" (Налим)
- "Old Age" (Старость)
- "The Complicated Affair" (Канитель)
- "At the Pharmacy"* (В аптеке)
- "Tryphon"* (Трифон)
- "Choristers" (Певчие)
- "A Cynic"* (Циник)
- "The Marshal's Widow" (У предводительши)
- "The Captain’s Uniform" (Капитанский мундир)
- "On Christmas Eve"* (В рождественскую ночь)
- "In Autumn"* (Осенью)
- "Examination for a Rank"* (Экзамен на чин)
- "Surgery" (Хирургия)
- "Russian Coal"* (Русский уголь)
- "The Chameleon" (Хамелеон)
- "A Slander" (Клевета)
- "Minds in Ferment"* (Брожение умов)
- "Vint" (Винт)
- "The Dacha Girl"* (Дачница)
- "The Looking Glass" (Зеркало)
- "Misery" (Тоска)
- "Children" (Детвора)
- "It’s Not Meant To Be!"* (Не судьба)
- "Abolished!"* (Упразднили!)
- "A Marriage of Convenience"* (Брак по расчёту)
- "Oysters" (Устрицы)
- "The Ballroom Pianist"* (Тапёр)
- "Anyuta"* (Анюта)
- "The Swedish Match" (Шведская спичка)
- "Gone Astray"* (Заблудшие)
- "Ivan Matveyich"* (Иван Матвеич)
- "Art"* (Художество)
- "The Exclamation Mark" (Восклицательный знак)
- "Fat and Thin"* (Толстый и тонкий)
- "Honorable Townsfolk"* (Господа обыватели)
- "Overdoing It" (Пересолил)
- "An Actor's End" (Актёрская гибель)
- "The Comedian"* (Комик)
- "Oh! The Public!" (Ну, публика!)
- "An Enigmatic Nature"* (Загадочная натура)
- "On the Harmful Effects of Tobacco"* (О вреде табака)
- "He Understood!"* (Он понял!)
- "The Whistlers"* (Свистуны)
- "The Wall"* (Стена)
- "Two Newspapermen"* (Два газетчика)

=== In the Twilight (В сумерках, 1887) ===
List
- "Dreams" (Мечты)
- "A Trivial Incident" (Пустой случай)
- "A Bad Business" (Недоброе дело)
- "Home" (Дома)
- "The Witch" (Ведьма)
- "Verochka" (Верочка)
- "In the Court" (В суде)
- "A Troublesome Visitor" (Беспокойный гость)
- "The Requiem" (Панихида)
- "On the Road" (На пути)
- "A Misfortune" (Несчастье)
- "An Incident" (Событие)
- "Agafya" (Агафья)
- "Enemies" (Враги)
- "A Nightmare" (Кошмар)
- "Easter Eve" (Святою ночью)

=== Innocent Speeches (Невинные речи, 1887) ===
List
- "First Aid" (Скорая помощь)
- "A Cure for Drinking" (Средство от запоя)
- "The Night Before the Trial" (Ночь перед судом)
- "Dear Dog" (Дорогая собака)
- "Life’s Hardships" (Житейские невзгоды)
- "The Terrible Night" (Страшная ночь)
- "A Happy Man" (Счастливчик)
- "A Transgression" (Беззаконие)
- "A Drama" (Драма)
- "A Work of Art" (Произведение искусства)
- "It Was Her!" (То была она!)
- "Hush!" (Тссс!)
- "Revenge" (Месть (Житейский водевиль))
- "In a Strange Land" (На чужбине)
- "One of Many" (Один из многих)
- "Nerves" (Нервы)
- "Intruders" (Злоумышленники)
- "Zinotchka" (Зиночка)
- "In the Dark" (В потёмках)
- "Not Wanted" (Лишние люди)
- "The Dependents" (Нахлебники)

=== Stories (Рассказы, 1888) ===
List
- "Happiness" (Счастье)
- "Typhus" (Тиф)
- "Vanka" (Ванька)
- "The Reed-Pipe" (Свирель)
- "Uprooted" (Перекати-поле)
- "A Problem" (Задача)
- "The Steppe" (Степь)
- "Mire" (Тина)
- "The Privy Councillor" (Тайный советник)
- "The Letter" (Письмо)
- "The Kiss" (Поцелуй)

=== Children (Детвора, 1889) (Note: Except for "The Runaway", all stories were previously published in other collections.) ===
List
- "Children" (Детвора)
- "Vanka" (Ванька)
- "An Incident" (Событие)
- "The Cook's Wedding" (Кухарка женится)
- "The Runaway" (Беглец)
- "Home" (Дома)

=== Gloomy People (Хмурые люди, 1890) ===
List
- "The Post" (Почта)
- "An Awkward Business" (Неприятность)
- "Volodya" (Володя)
- "The Princess" (Княгиня)
- "In Trouble" (Беда)
- "Sleepy" (Спать хочется)
- "The Cattle-Dealers" (Холодная кровь)
- "A Dreary Story" (Скучная история)
- "A Nervous Breakdown" (Припадок)
- "Champagne" (Шампанское)

=== Ward No. 6 (Палата No. 6, 1893) ===
List
- "Ward No. 6" (Палата № 6)
- "Peasant Wives" (Бабы)
- "Terror" (Страх)
- "Gusev" (Гусев)

=== Novellas and Stories (Повести и рассказы, 1894) ===
List
- "A Woman's Kingdom" (Бабье царство)
- "The Grasshopper" (Попрыгунья)
- "The Black Monk" (Черный монах)
- "In Exile" (В ссылке)
- "Rothschild's Violin" (Скрипка Ротшильда)
- "The Two Volodyas" (Володя большой и Володя маленький)
- "The Teacher of Literature" (Учитель словесности)
- "At a Country House" (В усадьбе)
- "A Father" (Отец)
- "The Student" (Студент)
- "Neighbours" (Соседи)

=== Peasants and My Life (Мужики и Моя жизнь, 1897) ===
List
- "Peasants" (Мужики)
- "My Life" (Моя жизнь)

=== Stories (Рассказы, 1901) (Note: Volume 9 of collected works, prepared for publication by the author himself.) ===
List
- "Ariadne" (Ариадна)
- "Anna on the Neck" (Анна на шее)
- "The House with the Mezzanine" (Дом с мезонином)
- "At Home" (В родном углу)
- "The Petcheneg" (Печенег)
- "The New Villa" (Новая дача)
- "In the Cart" (На подводе)
- "Peasants" (Мужики)
- "My Life" (Моя жизнь)
- "A Doctor's Visit" (Случай из практики)
- "The Darling" (Душечка)
- "On Official Duty" (По делам службы)
- "Ionych" (Ионыч)

== Short stories ==
Chekhov wrote over 500 short stories, some left unfinished. Much of his early work was published in comic periodicals, in the form of quips, topical writing, cartoon captions and sketches. As such, not all publications fit the definition of a short story.

Title [alternative title(s)]	Russian publication	Original title
A Letter to a Learned Neighbor	9 March 1880	Письмо к ученому соседу
Chase Two Rabbits, Catch None	11 May 1880	За двумя зайцами погонишься, ни одного не поймаешь
My Jubilee	29 June 1880	Мой юбилей
Papa	6 July 1880	Папаша
A Thousand and One Passions, or A Scary Night	27 July 1880	Тысяча одна страсть, или Страшная ночь
Little Apples	17 August 1880	За яблочки
Before the Wedding	12 October 1880	Перед свадьбой
À l’Américaine	7 December 1880	По-американски
Artists' Wives	7 December 1880	Жены артистов
St. Peter's Day	29 June 1881	Петров день
On the Train [In the Train Car]	29 September 1881	В вагоне
Salon de Variétés	4 October 1881	Салон де варьете
The Trial	23 October 1881	Суд
This and That: Poetry and Prose	29 October 1881	И то и сё: Поэзия и проза
This and That: Letters and Telegrams [Sarah Bernhardt Comes to Town]	6 December 1881	И то и се: Письма и телеграммы
A Sinner from Toledo	23 December 1881	Грешник из Толедо
In a Wolf's Cage	3 February 1882	На волчьей садке
I Forget!!	25 February 1882	Забыл!!
Life as a Series of Questions and Exclamations	26 February 1882	Жизнь в вопросах и восклицаниях
A Confession, or Olya, Zhenya, Zoya	20 March 1882	Исповедь, или Оля, Женя, Зоя
Green Scythe	23 April 1882	Зелёная Коса
The Date Took Place, But...	7 May 1882	Свидание хотя и состоялось, но...
The Correspondent	20 May 1882	Корреспондент
The Unnecessary Victory (novella)	17 June 1882	Ненужная победа
Village Doctors	18 June 1882	Сельские эскулапы
Lost Business [A Lost Cause]	22 June 1882	Пропащее дело
Bad Story	26 June 1882	Скверная история Нечто романообразное
The Twenty-Ninth of June	29 June 1882	Двадцать девятое июня
Which One of the Three?	13 July 1882	Который из трех?
He and She	23 July 1882	Он и она
The Fair	25 July 1882	Ярмарка
The Baroness	30 July 1882	Барыня
A Living Chattel	6 August 1882	Живой товар
Late-Blooming Flowers	17 October 1882	Цветы запоздалые
Encountered	20 November 1882	Нарвался
An Unsuccessful Visit	22 November 1882	Неудачный визит
The Good Friend	16 December 1882	Добрый знакомый
Two Scandals	16 December 1882	Два скандала
An Idyll – But Alas!	18 December 1882	Идиллия — увы и ах!
The Baron	20 December 1882	Барон
Revenge	31 December 1882	Месть
Experienced: A Psychological Study	31 December 1882	Пережитое: Психологический этюд
Reluctant Scammers	31 December 1882	Мошенники поневоле
Soothsayer and Soothsayeress	31 December 1882	Гадальщики и гадальщицы
Letter to the Editor	1882 (published 1923)	Письмо в редакцию
The Secrets of the Hundred and Forty-Four Catastrophes, or the Russian Rocambole	1882 (published 1923)	Тайны ста сорока четырех катастроф
Masquerades	5 January 1883	Ряженые
The Crooked Mirror	5 January 1883	Кривое зеркало
Rapture [Joy]	8 January 1883	Радость
Two in One	8 January 1883	Двое в одном
Two Romantic Stories [A Doctor's Romance and An Editor's Romance]	8 January 1883	Два романа
Rejected Love	16 January 1883	Отвергнутая любовь
The Confession	19 January 1883	Исповедь
Cases of Mania Grandiosa	22 January 1883	Случаи mania grandiosa
On a Dark Night	22 January 1883	Темною ночью
The Only Way	22 January 1883	Единственное средство
A Hypnotic Seance [A Seance]	24 January 1883	На магнетическом сеансе
Gone	29 January 1883	Ушла
A Lawyer's Romance: A Protocol	5 February 1883	Роман адвоката
On a Nail	5 February 1883	На гвозде
At the Barber's	7 February 1883	В цирульне
Modern Prayers	7 February 1883	Современные молитвы
A Woman Without Prejudice	10 February 1883	Женщина без предрассудков
Advice	12 February 1883	Совет
Grateful: A Psychological Study	12 February 1883	Благодарный: Психологический этюд
The Cross	12 February 1883	Крест
The Zealot	15 February 1883	Ревнитель
The Collection	18 February 1883	Коллекция
A Ram and a Lady	19 February 1883	Баран и барышня
Sentimentality	19 February 1883	Размазня
The Turnip: A Folktale	19 February 1883	Репка
A Poisonous Incident	22 February 1883	Ядовитый случай
The Triumph of the Victor	26 February 1883	Торжество победителя
The Patriot	27 February 1883	Патриот своего отечества
The Clever Janitor	3 March 1883	Умный дворник
The Bridegroom	5 March 1883	Жених
The Fool	9 March 1883	Дурак
A Story That's Hard to Name	12 March 1883	Рассказ, которому трудно подобрать название
The Brother	12 March 1883	Братец
The Philanthropist	14 March 1883	Филантроп
An Incident at Law	17 March 1883	Случай из судебной практики
An Enigmatic Nature	19 March 1883	Загадочная натура
A Conversation	26 March 1883	Разговор
Trickery	26 March 1883	Хитрец
Knights Without Fear and Without Reproach	2 April 1883	Рыцари без страх и упрека
Heights	9 April 1883	Обер-верхи
The Willow-Tree	9 April 1883	Верба
The Thief	16 April 1883	Вор
The Sheet of Paper [Easter Greetings]	16 April 1883	Лист
A Snack	23 April 1883	Закуска
Twenty-Six	23 April 1883	Двадцать шесть
Words, Words, Words	23 April 1883	Слова, слова и слова
The Mother-in-law Lawyer	30 April 1883	Теща-адвокат
The Philadelphia Conference of Natural Scientists	30 April 1883	Съезд естествоиспытателей в Филадельфии
A Classical Student [A Matter of Classics]	7 May 1883	Случай с классиком
The Cat	14 May 1883	Кот
Flying Islands	21 May 1883	Летающие острова
My Nana	21 May 1883	Моя Нана
The Nightingale's Benefit Performance	21 May 1883	Бенефис соловья: Рецензия
Mama and Mr. Lentovsky	21 May 1883	Мамаша и г. Лентовский
The Villains and Mr. Egorov	21 May 1883	Злодеи и г. Егоров
The Ingenuity of Mr. Rodon	21 May 1883	Находчивость г. Родона
The Deputy, or the Story of How Desdemonov Lost 25 Roubles	28 May 1883	Депутат, или повесть о том, как у Дездемонова 25 рублей пропало
The Heroic Lady	4 June 1883	Герой-барыня
How I Came to Be Lawfully Wed	11 June 1883	О том, как я в законный брак вступил
From the Diary of an Assistant Bookkeeper	18 June 1883	Из дневника помощника бухгалтера
Just Like His Grandfather	18 June 1883	Весь в дедушку
Once a Year	19 June 1883	Раз в год
Mr. Gulevich, Writer, and the Drowned Man	24 June 1883	Г-н Гулевич (автор) и утопленник
The Potato and the Tenor	24 June 1883	Картофель и тенор
The Death of a Government Clerk [The Death of a Civil Servant]	2 July 1883	Смерть чиновника
The Real Truth	9 July 1883	Сущая правда
A Naughty Boy [That Wretched Boy]	23 July 1883	Злой мальчик
Goat or Scoundrel?	23 July 1883	Козел или негодяй
The Trousseau [The Dowry]	30 July 1883	Приданое
The Virtuous Clerk	6 August 1883	Добродетельный кабатчик
The Daughter of Albion [A Daughter of Albion]	13 August 1883	Дочь Альбиона
Patronage	27 August 1883	Протекция
An Inquiry [Synopsis]	3 September 1883	Справка
The Retired Slave	10 September 1883	Отставной раб
The Fool, or The Retired Sea Captain	17 September 1883	Дура, или Капитан в отставке
Mayonnaise	17 September 1883	Майонез
In Autumn	24 September 1883	Осенью
In a Landau	24 September 1883	В ландо
Fat and Thin [Lean and Fat]	1 October 1883	Толстый и тонкий
The Grateful German	1 October 1883	Признательный немец
A Tragic Actor [The Tragedian / A Tragic Role]	8 October 1883	Трагик
The Daughter of a Commercial Advisor	15 October 1883	Дочь коммерции советника
A Sign of the Times	22 October 1883	Знамение времени
The Guardian	22 October 1883	Опекун
A Lawyer	29 October 1883	Юристка
At Sea	29 October 1883	В море
At the Post Office	29 October 1883	В почтовом отделении
From the Diary of a Young Girl	29 October 1883	Из дневника одной девицы
The Bird Market	5 November 1883	В Москве на Трубной площади
The Stationmaster	5 November 1883	Начальник станции
A Slander [The Slanderer]	12 November 1883	Клевета
In the Living-Room	26 November 1883	В гостиной
A Children's Primer [A Collection of Tales for Children]	3 December 1883	Сборник для детей
He Understood!	3 December 1883	Он понял!
The Swedish Match [The Safety Match]	5 December 1883	Шведская спичка
On Christmas Eve	22 December 1883	В рождественскую ночь
The Exam	25 December 1883	Экзамен: Из беседы двух очень умных людей
The Liberal	7 January 1884	Либерал
75,000	13 January 1884	75 000
The Decoration [The Order]	14 January 1884	Орден
The Comedian	22 January 1884	Комик
Unclean Tragedians and Leprous Playwrights	28 January 1884	Нечистые трагики и прокажённые драматурги
A Woman's Revenge	2 February 1884	Месть женщины
A Young Man	4 February 1884	Молодой человек
Vanka	9 February 1884	Ванька
On the Hunt	11 February 1884	На охоте
The Tutor	11 February 1884	Репетитор
O Women, Women!	15 February 1884	О женщины, женщины!
A Naive Woodsman	18 February 1884	Наивный леший
The French Ball [A Reporter's Dream]	18 February 1884	Сон репортёра
Choristers	25 February 1884	Певчие
The Complaints Book	10 March 1884	Жалобная книга
Two Letters	10 March 1884	Два письма
Perpetuum Mobile	17 March 1884	Perpetuum Mobile
Life Descriptions of Remarkable Contemporaries	23 March 1884	Жизнеописания достопримечательных современников
Reading	24 March 1884	Чтение
Maria Ivanovna	31 March 1884	Марья Ивановна
Tryphon	31 March 1884	Трифон
Some Thoughts on the Soul	14 April 1884	Несколько мыслей о душе
A Proud Man	24 April 1884	Гордый человек
The Album	5 May 1884	Альбом
Troubling Thoughts [Unconventional Thoughts]	12 May 1884	Несообразные мысли
Self-Indulgence	19 May 1884	Самобольщение
The Dacha Girl	2 June 1884	Дачница
I Had an Argument With My Wife	9 June 1884	С женой поссорился
Letter to a Reporter	9 June 1884	Письмо к репортеру
Dacha Pleasure	16 June 1884	Дачное удовольствие
Minds in Ferment	16 June 1884	Брожение умов
An Ideal Examination	16 June 1884	Идеальный экзамен
The Vaudevillian [The Skit]	30 June 1884	Водевиль
Examination for a Rank	14 July 1884	Экзамен на чин
Russian Coal	28 July 1884	Русский уголь
Surgery [The Dental Surgeon]	11 August 1884	Хирургия
An Idyll	25 August 1884	Идиллия
Tears Invisible to the World	25 August 1884	Невидимые миру слезы
The Chameleon	8 September 1884	Хамелеон
After the Fair	13 September 1884	Ярмарочное «итого»
Worse and Worse [Out of the Fire and Into the Fire]	20 September 1884	Из огня да в полымя
What Is To Be Done?	22 September 1884	Надлежащие меры
Chaos-Vile in Rome	27 September 1884	Кавардак в Риме
An Eclipse of the Moon [The Eclipse]	29 September 1884	Затмение Луны
Whist [Vint]	29 September 1884	Винт
In the Graveyard	6 October 1884	На кладбище
Goose Talk	6 October 1884	Гусиный разговор
A Mouth as Big as All Outdoors [Your Tongue Will Lead You to Kiev]	13 October 1884	Язык до Киева доведет
And Beautiful Things Must Have Limits	19 October 1884	И прекрасное должно иметь пределы
In a Home for the Terminally Ill and the Elderly	27 October 1884	В приюте для неизлечимо больных и престарелых
The Mask	27 October 1884	Маска
A Dissertation on Drama	3 November 1884	О драме
A Marriage of Convenience	8 November 1884	Брак по расчету
Honorable Townsfolk	10 November 1884	Господа обыватели
A Problem	17 November 1884	Задача
A Speech and a Strap	24 November 1884	Речь и ремешок
At the Sickbed [At the Patient's Bedside]	1 December 1884	У постели больного
Pictures From the Recent Past	1 December 1884	Картинки из недавнего прошлого
Oysters	6 December 1884	Устрицы
Marriage to the General	15 December 1884	Свадьба с генералом
A Liberal Fool	22 December 1884	Либеральный душка
The Christmas Tree	27 December 1884	Елка
The Terrible Night	27 December 1884	Страшная ночь
Out of Sorts	29 December 1884	Не в духе
To Speak or Be Silent?	1884 (published 1925)	Говорить или молчать?
Festive Duty	3 January 1885	Праздничная повинность
The Captain's Uniform	26 January 1885	Капитанский мундир
The Marshal's Widow	9 February 1885	У предводительши
A Living Chronology [A Living Calendar]	23 February 1885	Живая хронология
Service Notes	2 March 1885	Служебные пометки
A Report	3 March 1885	Донесение
A Man and a Dog Converse	9 March 1885	Разговор человека с собакой
At the Bathhouse	9 March 1885	В бане
Feast-Day Gratuities (From the Notebook of a Provincial Scrounger) [Celebration]	23 March 1885	Праздничные
Small Fry	23 March 1885	Мелюзга
Both are Better [Two of a Kind]	30 March 1885	Оба лучше
Hopeless	18 April 1885	Безнадежный
The Complicated Affair	27 April 1885	Канитель
May Day at Sokolniki	2 May 1885	На гулянье в сокольниках
The Last Mohican	6 May 1885	Последняя могиканша
In an Hotel [In a Hotel]	18 May 1885	В номерах
About This and That	18 May 1885	О том, о сём
The Diplomat	20 May 1885	Дипломат
Hard Housing	24 May 1885	Кулачье гнездо
Something about A. S. Dargomyzhsky	24 May 1885	Кое-что об А. С. Даргомыжском
The Wallet	24 May 1885	Бумажник
Abolished!	25 May 1885	Упразднили!
The Threat	25 May 1885	Угроза
The Crow	1 June 1885	Ворона
Trifles	1 June 1885	Финтифлюшки
Boots	3 June 1885	Сапоги
My Love	6 June 1885	Моя «она»
Nerves	8 June 1885	Нервы
A Country Cottage	15 June 1885	Дачники
Up the Ladder	15 June 1885	Вверх по лестнице
A Guard in Custody	17 June 1885	Стража под стражей
My Wives	20 June 1885	Мои жёны
Trickery: An Extremely Ancient Joke	22 June 1885	Надул
An Intelligent Log [An Educated Blockhead]	23 June 1885	Интеллигентное бревно
Malingerers	29 June 1885	Симулянты
The Fish [The Burbot]	1 July 1885	Налим
From the Memories of an Idealist	4 July 1885	Из воспоминаний идеалиста
At the Pharmacy	6 July 1885	В аптеке
A Horsey Name	7 July 1885	Лошадиная фамилия
It's Not Meant to Be!	13 July 1885	Не судьба!
Gone Astray	15 July 1885	Заблудшие
The Huntsman	18 July 1885	Егерь
A Prelude to a Marriage	20 July 1885	Необходимое предисловие
A Malefactor [The Intruder]	24 July 1885	Злоумышленник
On the Train: Conversational Shootout	27 July 1885	В вагоне: Разговорная перестрелка
Bridegroom and Dad	31 July 1885	Жених и папенька
The Guest	5 August 1885	Гость
A Man of Ideas	10 August 1885	Мыслитель
Horse and Quivering Doe	12 August 1885	Конь и трепетная лань
The Dealer	17 August 1885	Делец
Drowning	19 August 1885	Утопленник
The Wall	21 August 1885	Стена
The Whistlers	24 August 1885	Свистуны
The Head of the Family	26 August 1885	Отец семейства
The Village Elder [The Warden]	2 September 1885	Староста
A Dead Body	9 September 1885	Мертвое тело
Women's Good Fortune	14 September 1885	Женское счастье
The Cook's Wedding	16 September 1885	Кухарка женится
After the Benefit Performance	23 September 1885	После бенефиса
A Memo	28 September 1885	Записка
The Marriage Season	28 September 1885	К свадебному Сезону
General Education	30 September 1885	Общее образование
Sergeant Prishibeyev	5 October 1885	Унтер Пришибеев
Two Newspapermen	5 October 1885	Два газетчика
The Psychopaths	7 October 1885	Психопаты
In a Strange Land	12 October 1885	На чужбине
The Indian Rooster	14 October 1885	Индейский петух
Sleepy Follies	21 October 1885	Сонная одурь
Opinions on a Hat Disaster	24 October 1885	Мнения по поводу шляпной катастрофы
To Cure a Drinking Bout [A Cure for Drinking]	26 October 1885	Средство от запоя
Double Bass and Flute	28 October 1885	Контрабас и флейта
Ninotchka	4 November 1885	Ниночка
Dear Dog	9 November 1885	дорогая собака
The Writer	11 November 1885	Писатель
The Ballroom Pianist	14 November 1885	Тапёр
Overdoing It [Overseasoned]	16 November 1885	Пересолил
No Place	18 November 1885	Без места
Marriage in 10-15 Years' Time	21 November 1885	Брак через 10-15 лет
Old Age	23 November 1885	Старость
Sorrow [Grief / Misery / Woe]	25 November 1885	Горе
Oh! The Public!	30 November 1885	Ну, публика!
The Wimp [The Rag]	2 December 1885	Тряпка
My Talk with Edison [Tchekov and Edison]	7 December 1885	Моя беседа с Эдисоном
Sacred Simplicity [Holy Simplicity]	9 December 1885	Святая простота
Murder Will Out	14 December 1885	Шило в мешке
A Cynic	16 December 1885	Циник
Mari d’Elle [Her Husband]	18 December 1885	Mari d'Elle
An Entrepreneur Under the Sofa	21 December 1885	Антрепренёр под диваном
A Dream: A Christmas Story	25 December 1885	Сон: Святочный рассказ
The Exclamation Mark	28 December 1885	Восклицательный знак
The Looking Glass [The Mirror]	30 December 1885	Зеркало
Masquerades	1 January 1886	Ряженые
Letters to the Editor	4 January 1886	Письма
New Year's Day Martyrs	4 January 1886	Новогодние великомученики
Art	6 January 1886	Художество
A Night in the Cemetery	8 January 1886	Ночь на кладбище
A Blunder [Foiled!]	11 January 1886	Неудача
The First Debut	13 January 1886	Первый дебют
The Telephone	19 January 1886	У телефона
Children [Kids]	20 January 1886	Детвора
The Biggest City	25 January 1886	Самый большой город
The Opening	25 January 1886	Открытие
Misery	27 January 1886	Тоска
The Night Before the Trial	1 February 1886	Ночь перед судом
An Upheaval [The Commotion]	3 February 1886	Переполох
Conversation Between a Drunk and a Sober Devil	8 February 1886	Беседа пьяного с трезвым чертом
An Actor's End [Death of an Actor]	10 February 1886	Актерская гибель
The Foolish Frenchman	15 February 1886	Глупый француз
The Requiem	15 February 1886	Панихида
Anyuta	22 February 1886	Анюта
On Mortality: A Carnival Tale	22 February 1886	О бренности
A Person	1 March 1886	Персона
Ivan Matveyich	3 March 1886	Иван Матвеич
Poison	3 March 1886	Отрава
The Witch	8 March 1886	Ведьма
A Story Without an End	10 March 1886	Рассказ без конца
The Little Joke [A Joke]	12 March 1886	Шуточка
Agafya	15 March 1886	Агафья
My Conversation With the Postmaster	15 March 1886	Мой разговор с почтмейстером
The Wolf [Hydrophobia]	17 March 1886	Волк
To Paris!	22 March 1886	В Париж!
Spring	24 March 1886	Весной
A Nightmare	29 March 1886	Кошмар
Lots of Paper	29 March 1886	Много бумаги
The Rook	29 March 1886	Грач
On the River	30 March 1886	На реке
Grisha	5 April 1886	Гриша
Love	7 April 1886	Любовь
Easter Eve [Easter Night / The Night Before Easter / On Easter Eve]	13 April 1886	Святою ночью
Ladies	19 April 1886	Дамы
Strong Impressions	21 April 1886	Сильные ощущения
A Fairy Tale	3 May 1886	Сказка
A Gentleman Friend	3 May 1886	Знакомый мужчина
A Happy Man	5 May 1886	Счастливчик
The Privy Councillor	6 May 1886	Тайный советник
A Day in the Country	19 May 1886	День за городом
In a Boarding House	24 May 1886	В пансионе
At a Summer Villa [At the Cottage]	25 May 1886	На даче
Nothing To Be Done	26 May 1886	От нечего делать
The Boredom of Life	31 May 1886	Скука жизни
Romance with Double-Bass	7 June 1886	Роман с контрабасом
Panic Fears	16 June 1886	Страхи
The Chemist's Wife	21 June 1886	Аптекарша
Not Wanted	23 June 1886	Лишние люди
A Serious Step	28 June 1886	Серьёзный шаг
The Chorus Girl	5 July 1886	Хористка
The Schoolmaster	12 July 1886	Учитель
A Troublesome Visitor [A Troublesome Guest]	14 July 1886	Беспокойный гость
Rara Avis [A Rare Bird]	19 July 1886	Rara avis
Other People's Misfortune	28 July 1886	Чужая беда
You and You [Women Make Trouble]	4 August 1886	Ты и вы
The Husband	9 August 1886	Муж
A Misfortune [A Calamity]	16 August 1886	Несчастье
A Pink Stocking	16 August 1886	Розовый чулок
Martyrs	18 August 1886	Страдальцы
The First-class Passenger	23 August 1886	Пассажир 1-го класса
Talent	6 September 1886	Талант
The Dependents	8 September 1886	Нахлебники
The Jeune Premier	13 September 1886	Первый любовник
In the Dark	15 September 1886	В потемках
A Trivial Incident	20 September 1886	Пустой случай
A Bright Personality	25 September 1886	Светлая личность
A Drama	25 September 1886	Драма
A Tripping Tongue	27 September 1886	Длинный язык
A Trifle from Life	29 September 1886	Житейская мелочь
Difficult People	7 October 1886	Тяжелые люди
Ah, Teeth!	9 October 1886	Ах, зубы!
In the Court	11 October 1886	В суде
Revenge	11 October 1886	Месть
Whining	12 October 1886	Нытье
The Proposal	23 October 1886	Предложение
A Peculiar Man	25 October 1886	Необыкновенный
My Household	26 October 1886	Мой Домострой
Mire [Tina]	29 October 1886	Тина
The Lodger	1 November 1886	Жилец
A Dreadful Night	3 November 1886	Недобрая ночь
Calchas	10 November 1886	Калхас
Dreams [Daydreams]	15 November 1886	Мечты
Hush!	15 November 1886	Тссс!
At the Mill	17 November 1886	На мельнице
Excellent People	22 November 1886	Хорошие люди
An Incident [An Event]	24 November 1886	Событие
The Playwright	27 November 1886	Драматург
The Orator	29 November 1886	Оратор
In Trouble	1 December 1886	Беда
The Commission	8 December 1886	Заказ
The Objet d'Art [A Work of Art]	13 December 1886	Произведение искусства
The Jubilee	15 December 1886	Юбилей
Who Was to Blame?	20 December 1886	Кто виноват?
On the Road	25 December 1886	На пути
Vanka	25 December 1886	Ванька
It Was Her!	27 December 1886	То была она!
Man: A Bit of Philosophy	27 December 1886	Человек: Немножко философии
Love Without a Ripple...	1886 (published 1912)	Любовь без зыби...
Scrambled Boots	1886 (published 1913)	Сапоги всмятку
For the Information of Husbands	1886 (published 1927)	К сведению мужей
New Year's Torture	4 January 1887	Новогодняя пытка
Champagne (A Wayfarer's Story)	5 January 1887	Шампанское (рассказ проходимца)
Frost	12 January 1887	Мороз
The Beggar	19 January 1887	Нищий
Enemies	20 January 1887	Враги
The Good German	24 January 1887	Добрый немец
Darkness	26 January 1887	Темнота
Polinka	2 February 1887	Полинька
Drunk	9 February 1887	Пьяные
An Inadvertence [A Rash Thing to Do]	21 February 1887	Неосторожность
Verochka [Verotchka]	21 February 1887	Верочка
Shrove Tuesday	23 February 1887	Накануне поста
A Defenceless Creature	28 February 1887	Беззащитное существо
A Bad Business	2 March 1887	Недоброе дело
Home	7 March 1887	Дома
The Lottery Ticket	9 March 1887	Выигрышный билет
Too Early!	16 March 1887	Рано!
An Encounter	18 March 1887	Встреча
Typhus	23 March 1887	Тиф
Life's Hardships	28 March 1887	Житейские невзгоды
In Passion Week	30 March 1887	На страстной неделе
A Mystery	11 April 1887	Тайна
The Cossack	13 April 1887	Казак
The Letter	18 April 1887	Письмо
Boa Constrictor and Rabbit	20 April 1887	Удав и кролик
In the Spring [Cat's Monologue]	25 April 1887	Весной: Сцена-монолог
The Critic	27 April 1887	Критик
An Adventure	4 May 1887	Происшествие
The Examining Magistrate [The Investigator]	11 May 1887	Следователь
Aborigines [The Philistine]	18 May 1887	Обыватели
Volodya	1 June 1887	Володя
Happiness [Fortune]	6 June 1887	Счастье
Bad Weather	8 June 1887	Ненастье
A Drama [A Play]	13 June 1887	Драма
One of Many	15 June 1887	Один из многих
First Aid	22 June 1887	Скорая помощь
A Nasty Story [A Disgraceful Affair / A Most Unfortunate Incident / An Unpleasant Predicament]	29 June 1887	Неприятная история
A Transgression	4 July 1887	Беззаконие
Notes from the Journal of a Quick-Tempered Man [From the Diary of a Violent-tempered Man]	5 July 1887	Из записок вспыльчивого человека
Uprooted	14 July 1887	Перекати-поле
A Father	20 July 1887	Отец
A Happy Ending	25 July 1887	Хороший конец
In the Coach-House	3 August 1887	В сарае
Intruders	8 August 1887	Злоумышленники (Рассказ очевидцев)
Before the Eclipse	9 August 1887	Перед затмением
Zinotchka	10 August 1887	Зиночка
The Doctor	17 August 1887	Доктор
The Siren	24 August 1887	Сирена
The Reed-Pipe [The Pipe]	29 August 1887	Свирель
An Avenger	12 September 1887	Мститель
The Post	14 September 1887	Почта
A Wedding	21 September 1887	Свадьба
The Runaway	28 September 1887	Беглец
A Problem	19 October 1887	Задача
Intrigues	24 October 1887	Интриги
The Old House	29 October 1887	Старый дом
The Cattle-Dealers	31 October 1887	Холодная кровь
Expensive Lessons	9 November 1887	Дорогие уроки
The Lion and The Sun	5 December 1887	Лев и Солнце
In Trouble [A Misfortune]	7 December 1887	Беда
The Kiss	15 December 1887	Поцелуй
Boys	21 December 1887	Мальчики
Kashtanka	25 December 1887	Каштанка
A Lady's Story [Natalia Vladimirovna]	25 December 1887	Рассказ госпожи NN
A Story Without a Title	1 January 1888	Без заглавия
Sleepy [Let Me Sleep]	25 January 1888	Спать хочется
The Steppe (novella)	25 February 1888	Степь (История одной поездки)
Lights	25 May 1888	Огни
An Awkward Business [An Unpleasantness]	3 June 1888	Неприятность
The Beauties	21 September 1888	Красавицы
The Party [The Name-Day Party]	27 October 1888	Именины
A Nervous Breakdown [The Seizure / An Attack of Nerves]	29 November 1888	Припадок
The Cobbler and the Devil [The Shoemaker and the Devil]	25 December 1888	Сапожник и нечистая сила
Beauties (From a Doctor's Notebook) (unfinished)	1888 (published 1914)	Красавицы (из записок врача)
The Bet	1 January 1889	Пари
The Princess	26 March 1889	Княгиня
A Forced Declaration [No Comment / The Sudden Death of a Steed]	22 April 1889	Вынужденное заявление
A Dreary Story [A Boring Story / A Dull Story]	27 October 1889	Скучная история
Thieves [The Horse Stealers / Robbers]	1 April 1890	Воры
Gusev [Goussiev]	25 December 1890	Гусев
At the Zelenins' (unfinished)	1890 (published 1905)	У Зелениных
A Letter	1890 (published 1907)	Письмо
Peasant Wives [Women]	25 June 1891	Бабы
The Duel (novella)	22 October 1891	Дуэль
In Moscow	7 December 1891	В Москве
The Wife [My Wife]	1 January 1892	Жена
The Grasshopper [The Butterfly / The Fidget]	5 January 1892	Попрыгунья
After the Theatre	7 April 1892	После театра
Fragment	18 April 1892	Отрывок
The Story of a Commercial Venture	2 May 1892	История одного торгового предприятия
In Exile	9 May 1892	В ссылке
From a Retired Teacher's Notebook [From a Retired Teacher's Diary]	23 May 1892	Из записной книжки старого педагога
A Fishy Affair	13 June 1892	Рыбья любовь
Neighbours	15 June 1892	Соседи
Ward No. 6 [Ward 6]	1 November 1892	Палата No. 6
Terror [Fear]	25 December 1892	Страх
The Story of an Unknown Man [An Anonymous Story / The Story of a Nobody] (novella)	1 February 1893	Рассказ неивестного человека
The Two Volodyas	28 December 1893	Володя большой и Володя маленький
A Woman's Kingdom	1 January 1894	Бабье царство
The Black Monk	5 January 1894	Чёрный монах
Rothschild's Violin [Rothschild's Fiddle]	6 February 1894	Скрипка Ротшильда
The Student	14 April 1894	Студент
The Teacher of Literature [The Russian Teacher]	10 July 1894	Учитель словесности
At a Country House [In a Manor House]	28 August 1894	В усадьбе
The Head Gardener's Story	25 December 1894	Рассказ старшего садовинка
Three Years (novella)	19 January 1895	Три года
His Wife [The Helpmate]	15 March 1895	Супруга
Whitebrow [Patch]	18 October 1895	Белолoбый
Anna on the Neck [The Order of St. Anne]	22 October 1895	Анна на шее
Murder [The Murder]	1 November 1895	Убийство
Ariadne	1 December 1895	Ариадна
Schulz (unfinished)	1895 (published 1914)	Шульц
The House with the Mezzanine [An Artist's Story]	1 April 1896	Дом с мезонином
My Life (novella)	10 December 1896	Моя жизнь
Peasants	23 August 1897	Мужики
The Petcheneg [The Savage]	2 November 1897	Печенег
At Home	16 November 1897	В родном углу
In the Cart [The Schoolmistress]	21 December 1897	На подводе
All Friends Together [A Visit to Friends / With Friends]	2 February 1898	У знакомых
The Man in the Case [A Hard Case / The Encased Man / The Man in the Shell]	1 July 1898	Человек в футляре
About Love [Concerning Love]	1 August 1898	О любви
Gooseberries	1 August 1898	Крыжовник
Ionych [Ionitch / Doctor Startsev]	31 August 1898	Ионыч
A Doctor's Visit [A Case History / A Medical Case]	1 December 1898	Случай из практики
The Disorder of Compensation (unfinished)	1898 (published 1905)	Расстройство компенсации
The Darling	3 January 1899	Душечка
The New Villa	3 January 1899	Новая дача
On Official Duty [On Official Business / On Duty]	3 January 1899	По делам службы
The Lady with the Dog [Lady with a Lapdog / The Lady with the Toy Dog]	1 December 1899	Дама с собачкой
At Christmas Time	1 January 1900	На святках
In the Ravine [In the Hollow / In the Gully]	24 January 1900	В овраге
The Cripple (unfinished)	1900 (published 1905)	Калека
The Bishop	23 March 1902	Архиерей
Betrothed [A Marriageable Girl / The Fiancée / The Bride]	26 November 1903	Невеста

=== Other humorous writing ===
Title	Russian publication	Original title
Elements Most Often Found in Novels, Short Stories, etc.	9 March 1880	Что чаще всего встречается в романах, повестях и т. п.
Nadia N.'s Vacation Homework	15 June 1880	Каникулярные работы институтки Наденьки N
The Temperaments	17 September 1881	Темпераменты
Antosha Ch's Advertising Office	24 October 1881	Контора объявлений Антоши Ч
Sarah Bernhardt	30 November 1881	Сара Бернар
Again About Sarah Bernhardt	6 December 1881	Опять о Capе Бернар
Supplementary Questions for the Statistical Census, Submitted by Antosha Chekhonte	29 January 1882	Дополнительные вопросы к личным картам статистической переписи, предлагаемые Антошей Чехонте
Comic Advertisements and Announcements	12 February 1882	Комические рекламы и объявления
Questions Posed by a Mad Mathematician	20 February 1882	Задачи сумасшедшего математика
Budilnik Calendar for 1882	6 March 1882	Календарь «Будильника» на 1882 год
Meeting Spring	23 March 1882	Встреча весны
Philosophical Definitions of Life	31 December 1882	Философские определения жизни
Advertisements and Announcements	1882 (published 1923)	Рекламы и объявления
Thoughts of a Reader of Newspapers and Magazines	15 January 1883	Мысли читателя газет и журналов
Bibliography	16 January 1883	Библиография
Malicious Bankrupts	29 January 1883	Злостные банкроты
What's Better?	5 February 1883	Что лучше?
Questions and Answers	12 February 1883	Вопросы и ответы
America in Rostov on the Don	21 March 1883	Америка в Ростове-на-Дону
3,000 Foreign Words that have Entered into the Russian Language	23 July 1883	3000 иностранных слов, вошедших в употребление русского языка
A Brief Anatomy of Man	23 August 1883	Краткая анатомия человека
My Ranks and Titles	10 September 1883	Мои чины и титулы
My Witticisms and Sayings	15 October 1883	Мои остроты и изречения
List of Exhibitors Awarded With Iron Medals for the Russian Section at the Amsterdam Exhibition	15 October 1883	Список экспонентов, удостоенных чугунных медалей по русскому отделу на выставке в Амстердаме
A New Illness and an Old Cure	1883 (published 1931)	Новая болезнь и старое средство
Buckwheat Porridge Praises Itself	1883 (published 1931)	Гречневая каша сама себя хвалит
The Testament of an Old Man, 1883	5 January 1884	Завещание старого, 1883-го года
Contract of 1884 with Mankind	14 January 1884	Контракт 1884 года с человечеством
Mixed-up Advertisements	14 January 1884	Перепутанные объявления
Forgiveness	18 February 1884	Прощение
The Fruit of a Long Reflection	14 April 1884	Плоды долгих размышлений
Country Rules	26 May 1884	Дачные правила
The Sign	27 October 1884	Вывеска
On the Characteristics of Nations	17 November 1884	К характеристике народов
The Newest Writer	1 December 1884	Новейший письмовник
A Proposal	29 December 1884	Предписание
The Case of the Year 1884	5 January 1885	Дело о 1884 годе
No Harmful Thoughts	24 January 1885	Не тлетворные мысли
Maslenitsa Rules of Discipline	25 January 1885	Масленичные правила дисциплины
The Pharmacy Tax, or Help, They're Robbing You!!	14 February 1885	Аптекарская такса, или Спасите, грабят!!
About March	16 March 1885	О марте
A Prose Toast	20 March 1885	Тост прозаиков
A Woman's Toast	20 March 1885	Женский тост
Rules for Beginning Authors	20 March 1885	Правила для начинающих авторов
Red Hill	30 March 1885	Красная горка
About April	6 April 1885	О апреле
Herat	20 April 1885	Герат
Life is Beautiful!	27 April 1885	Жизнь прекрасна!
A Woman From a Drunkard's Point of View	2 May 1885	Женщина с точки зрения пьяницы
About May	4 May 1885	О мае
Fish Business	14 June 1885	Рыбье дело
About June and July	27 July 1885	О июне и июле
Something Serious	27 July 1885	Нечто серьёзное
Advertisement	22 August 1885	Реклама
About August	24 August 1885	О августе
Doctor's Advice	2 October 1885	Врачебные советы
A Guide For Those Who Want to Get Married	2 November 1885	Руководство для желающих жениться
Intellectual Tavern-Keepers	8 November 1885	Интеллигенты-кабатчики
Home Remedies	7 December 1885	Домашние средства
Visiting Cards	4 January 1886	Визитные карточки
Champagne: Thoughts from a New Year's Hangover	4 January 1886	Шампанское: Мысли с новогоднего похмелья
A Competition	11 January 1886	Конкурс
Bliny	19 February 1886	Блины
About Women	26 April 1886	О женщинах
A Literary Table of Ranks	10 May 1886	Литературная табель о рангах
Persons Entitled to Travel Free of Charge on the Imperial Russian Railways	7 June 1886	Список лиц, имеющих право на бесплатный проезд по русским железным дорогам
A Glossary of Terms for Young Ladies	12 July 1886	Словотолкователь для «барышень»
Statistics	18 October 1886	Статистика

== Nonfiction ==
- Fragments of Moscow Life (1883–1885)
- The Case of Rykov and Company (1884)
- A Journey to Sakhalin (1895), including:
  - Across Siberia (1890)
  - Sakhalin Island (1891–1895)

=== Letters ===
(In English translation.)

- Letters of Anton Tchehov to His Family and Friends: With a Biographical Sketch. Translated by Constance Garnett. New York. 1920. Internet Archive on-line edition.
- Letters on the Short Story, the Drama, and Other Literary Topics, by Anton Chekhov. Selected and Edited by Louis S. Friedland. London. 1924.
- The Letters of Anton Pavolvitch Tchekhov to Olga Leonardovna Knipper. Translated from the Russian by Constance Garnett. New York.
- The Life and Letters of Anton Tchekov. Translated and Edited by S.S. Koteliansky and Philip Tomlinson. New York. 1925.
- The Personal Papers of Anton Chekhov. Introduction by Matthew Josephson. New York. 1948.
- The Selected Letters of Anton Chekhov. Edited by Lillian Hellman and translated by Sidonie Lederer. New York. 1955. ISBN 0-374-51838-6.
- Dear Writer, Dear Actress: The Love Letters of Anton Chekhov and Olga Knipper. Ecco, 1997, ISBN 0-88001-550-0.
- Anton Chekhov's Life and Thought: Selected Letters and Commentary. Translated by Simon Karlinsky, Michael Henry Heim, Northwestern University Press, 1997, ISBN 0-8101-1460-7.
- A Life in Letters. Translated by Rosamund Bartlett, Anthony Phillips. Penguin Books, 2004. ISBN 0-14-044922-1.

=== Notebooks ===
- Note-Book of Anton Chekhov. Translated by S. S. Koteliansky, Leonard Woolf, New York: B. W. Huebsch, 1921. Internet Archive on-line edition.

== Selected English-language compilations of stories ==
- The Kiss and Other Stories, trans. Robert Edward Crozier Long (1908)
- The Darling and Other Stories, trans. Constance Garnett (1916)
- The Duel and Other Stories, trans. Constance Garnett (1916)
- The Lady with the Little Dog and Other Stories, trans. Constance Garnett (1917)
- The Party and Other Stories, trans. Constance Garnett (1917)
- The Wife and Other Stories, trans. Constance Garnett (1918)
- The Witch and Other Stories, trans. Constance Garnett (1918)
- The Bishop and Other Stories, trans. Constance Garnett (1919)
- The Chorus Girl and Other Stories, trans. Constance Garnett (1920)
- Ward Number Six and Other Stories, trans. Ronald Hingley (Oxford, 1965)
- The Russian Master and Other Stories, trans. Ronald Hingley (Oxford, 1984)
- The Steppe and Other Stories, trans. Ronald Hingley (Oxford, 1991)
- Selected Stories of Anton Chekhov, trans. Richard Pevear and Larissa Volokhonsky (2000)
- The Complete Short Novels, trans. Richard Pevear and Larissa Volokhonsky (2000)
- The Steppe and Other Stories, 1887-1891, trans. Ronald Wilks (Penguin, 2001)
- Ward No. 6 and Other Stories, 1892-1895, trans. Ronald Wilks (Penguin, 2002)
- The Lady with the Little Dog and Other Stories, 1896-1904, trans. Ronald Wilks (Penguin, 2002)
- Seven Short Novels, trans. Barbara Norman Makanowitzky (Norton, 2003)
- About Love and Other Stories, trans. Rosamund Bartlett (Oxford, 2004)
- Fifty-Two Stories, trans. Richard Pevear and Larissa Volokhonsky (Knopf 2020)
