= The Petcheneg =

- Short story by Anton Chekhov
- Original title: Печенег
- Country: Russia
- Language: Russian

Publication
- Published in: Russkiye Vedomosti (1897)
- Publisher: Adolf Marks (1901)
- Publication date: November 1897

"The Petcheneg" (Russian: Печенег) is an 1897 short story by Anton Chekhov.

== Publication history ==
The story was written in Nice, France, right after "In My Own Corner" (which was published two weeks later), and on 24 October was sent to Russkiye Vedomosti's editor Vasily Sobolevski. It was first published in the No. 303, 2 November 1897 issue of Russkiye Vedomosti. In its edited version, Chekhov included it into volume 9 of his Collected Works published by Adolf Marks in 1899–1901.

== Background ==
In 1887 Chekhov visited the Northern Don region, and the story is loosely based upon this experience. According to the writer P. Surozhsky, in these two stories, "The Petcheneg" and "In My Own Corner", several details could be found that point at the region to the North of Taganrog. "It is the area where the Donets railway passes, which gets a mention in both stories, while in "The Petcheneg" he also mentions the station Provalye," he argued. Y. Polfyorov quoted Chekhov as having said, with regard to these two stories, as well as the region described in them: "It grieved me to see how this land, which looked as if it had been created for the most free and wide cultural life was stifled in ignorance, and the source of this ignorance were the army officers. Surely, there are other reasons which the Cossacks have nothing to do with, but this one is primal. Should the army officer, who is to be the Cossack's spiritual tutor, be better educated, should he have more culture, such 'petchenegs' would have gone."

== Plot summary ==
A young lawyer (who remains unnamed), going to the village Dyuyevka on business, arrives late to the station, and a man he'd met in the carriage, a retired Cossack officer named Zhmukhin, invites him to stay for the night in his house. Zhmukhin, a man prone to philosophizing, is hospitality itself, but the world of ignorance and backwardness the young man finds himself at the farm, is so unbearable that he stays awake all night and departs at sunrise in anger and dismay.

== Reception ==
The reviews to the two stories, "In My Own Corner" and "The Petcehenyeg" (which have been seen as linked even to the point of forming a small cycle), were few, but positive. There was at least one rave (anonymous) review, in the Courier newspaper which praised the two stories' harsh realism and the way they prompted a reader 'heavy thoughts' and 'bitter feelings', making them think deeper about what the kind of life surrounds them.

Angel Bogdanovich, reviewing the two stories in Mir Bozhy, argued that Chekhov's mindset was becoming more and more dark, and his work now totally depressive, "leaving the impression of impenetrable darkness".
