= Peasant Wives =

- Short story by Anton Chekhov
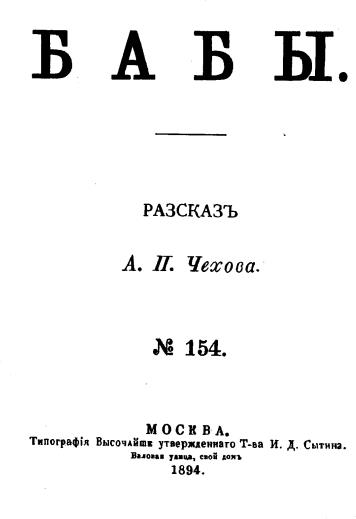
- Peasant Wives
- Original title: Бабы
- Translator: Robert E.D. Long (1908); Constance Garnett (1918)
- Country: Russia
- Language: Russian

Publication
- Published in: Novoye Vremya
- Publisher: Adolf Marks
- Publication date: 25 June (old style) 1891
- Published in English: 1908

"Peasant Wives" (Russian: Бабы, romanized: Babi) is an 1891 short story by Anton Chekhov.

== Publication ==
The story was first published in the 25 June (old style) 1891, No. 5502 issue of Novoye Vremya. After minor cuts it was included into the Ward No. 6 collection (St. Petersburg, 1893) to feature unchanged in its 2–7 (1893–1899) editions.

In July 1891 Ivan Gorbunov-Posadov approached Chekhov with the request: to publish as a separate edition "...this brilliant tale of a local Tartuffe, a vile, debauched, God-fearing hypocrite", and Chekhov gave him his permission. The story came out in 1894 via the Posrednik Publishers, but with the Varvara and Sofya's nightly dialogue cut out, the scene which is crucial for the understanding of the whole story. After some stylistic revision Chekhov included it into Volume 6 of his Collected Works published by Adolf Marks in 1889–1901.

After its release, the story was banned from both the school and public libraries. Dmitry Averkiyev, then a member of the Scientific committee of the Ministry of education provided the following verdict on "Peasant Wives": "The story is well written, but its moral foundations are too shaky for it to be considered fit for public libraries."

Lev Tolstoy included "Peasant Wife" into his personal list of Chekhov's best stories.

== Plot ==
Matvey Savitch, a tradesman, stops for the night in the house of a small landowner Kashin, or Dyudya, as he's known among the locals. The latter asks the former about a boy named Kuzka who travels with him, and Matvey Savitch relates a strange and harrowing story of his adopted son, who looks and behaves more like a frightened little servant. It is a story of Mashenka, Kuzka's mother whom Matvey Savvich had seduced, while her husband Vasya was serving in the army. When Vasya returned, Mashenka refused to return to the man she hated: she fell madly for her lover... So the latter betrays her – first to Vasya, who viciously beats her up, and then to the police, after Vasya had been found dead, a victim, apparently, of arsenic poisoning. Some people suggest it might have been suicide, but Matvey Savitch confidently points at his former lover as a culprit, so she gets sent to jail, then Siberia... After which he adopts Mashenka's son, for his "soul's salvation", as he optimistically puts it. Dyudya is totally on the side of Matvey Savich: they both are convinced Mashenka is the only one who's to blame for her own demise... Two of Dyudya's daughters-in-law, Varvara and Sofya, who happen to hate their husbands too, beg to differ. The story gives some strange ideas to Varvara who, as the night comes, suggests to Sofya that they both might also get rid of their hated men, Dyudya's sons Fyodor and hunchback Alyushka, respectively.
