= Small Fry (short story) =

1885 short story by Anton Chekhov

- Short story by Anton Chekhov
- Original title: Мелюзга
- Translator: Constance Garnett
- Country: Russia
- Language: Russian

Publication
- Published in: Oskolki
- Publication date: 12 March 1885
- Published in English: 1918

"Small Fry" (Russian: Мелюзга, romanized: Melyuzga) is a short story by Anton Chekhov originally published in Oskolki magazine (No. 12 issue), on 25 March [O.S. 12 March] 1885 25 and signed A. Chekhonte (А. Чехонте). It featured in all the 14 editions of Chekhov's collection Motley Stories (Пёстрые рассказы) first published in Saint Petersburg in 1886, and was included by Chekhov in Volume 3 of his Collected Works, published by Adolf Marks in 1899–1901.

== Synopsis ==
The petty clerk Nevyrazimov, sitting in his office on the Easter Eve in the company of a cockroach scurrying the table, muses upon what he might do to make it in the world (steal big money or perhaps report on somebody to the secret police) but comes to the conclusion that such deeds would be beyond his abilities. Disgusted with the feeling of his own unworthiness he takes it out on the cockroach and "feels better".
