= My Life (novella) =

1896 novella by Anton Chekhov

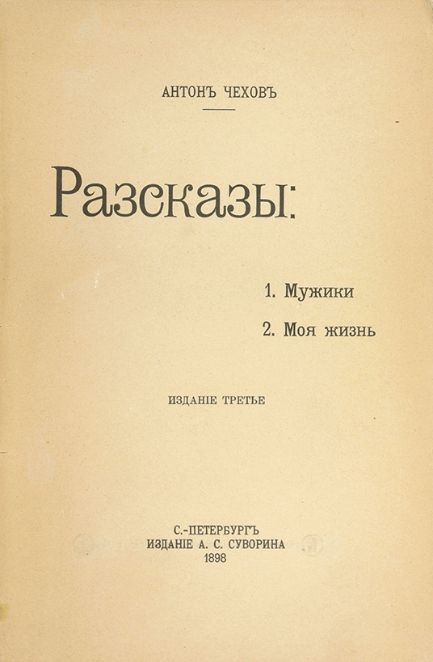
- Author: Anton Chekhov
- Original title: Моя жизнь
- Language: Russian
- Publisher: Niva
- Publication date: 1896
- Publication place: Russia

My Life (Russian: Моя жизнь, romanized: Moya zhizn') is an 1896 novella by Anton Chekhov, set in a provincial southern Russian city like Chekhov's own hometown of Taganrog.

== Publication history ==
The novella first appeared in the October–December, Nos. 10–12, 1896 issues of the Monthly Literary Supplement to Niva magazine. Revised by the author, it was included into the Suvorin-published collection Peasants and My Life, to be reproduced, unchanged, in all of its 7 editions (1897–1899). With some additional changes edits Chekhov included in into Volume 9 of his Collected Works, published in 1899–1901 by Adolf Marks.

== Background ==
Chekhov started working upon the novella in February 1896 and finished it in the late July of that year. There was some disagreement about the title. Chekhov hated "My life" (in particular, the 'my' bit of it) and suggested that it should be called "In the Nineties" (В 90-х годах) instead. The Niva's editor Alexey Tikhonov-Lugovoy thought that was "too retro-sounding, as if it were some kind of memoirs", so the author decided against further arguing.
