= In Exile (short story) =

- Short story by Anton Chekhov
- Original title: В ссылке
- Country: Russia
- Language: Russian

Publication
- Published in: Vsemirnaya Illustratsiya (1892)
- Publisher: Adolf Marks (1901)
- Publication date: 9 May 1892

"In Exile" (Russian: В ссылке, romanized: V ssylke) is an 1892 short story by Anton Chekhov.

== Publication ==
"In Exile" was first published in the No. 20, 9 May 1892 issue of the Vsemirnaya Illustratsiya magazine. In a re-worked version (with two scenes re-written and the plot slightly changed) it was included into the second, 1894 edition of Chekhov's collection Novellas and Stories (Повести и рассказы), and later into Volume 8 of the Collected Works by A.P. Chekhov published by Adolf Marks in 1899–1901.

== Background ==
The story was inspired by Chekhov's journey through Siberia and his stay in Sakhalin and, in particular, two episodes of this trip. On 4 (or 5) May 1890 he crossed the Ishim River on a ferry and then on 7 May bad weather prevented him from crossing Irtysh, so that he had to spend the night in the ferrymen's izba. Of these two instances he informed both his relatives (in a 16 May letter) and his regular correspondent, the children writer Maria Vladimirovna Kiselyova. Both were mentioned in his Po Sibiri (Through Siberia) set of sketches.

While on Sakhalin, Chekhov met a boatman nicknamed Krasivy (The Handsome, mentioned in Sakhalin Island, Chapter IV), a self-professed 'happy man' who struck him with his own peculiar brand of Tolstovian philosophy. It was Krasivy, apparently, who became a prototype for Semyon Tolkovy, the story's hero.

== Synopsis ==
Two ex-convicts, working as ferrymen, and the narrator sit by the wood-fire at night. A young Tartar, whose name nobody knows, is homesick, he longs for his wife and loathes the cold and cruel world around him. Old Simeon, known as Tolkovy (Brainy) listens to him with disdain, for he had brought himself "to such a point that [he] can sleep naked on the ground and eat grass", in his own words.

Tolkovy relates the story of Vasily Sergeyevich, a nobleman, whose life here in exile was full of desires, frustrations and downfalls. Of the latter's self-inflicted suffering he speaks almost with relish. Next to him he feels a superior being: having killed in himself all desires, he now is free and happy. The young Tartar passionately disagrees. For him Tolkovy with his 'happiness' is a dead man, while Vasily Sergeyevich is alive, even if very unhappy.

== Critical reception ==
Pyotr Bykov, the literary editor of Vsemirnaya Illustratsiya, admired the story, according to Ieronim Yasinsky's memoirs. The critic Yevgeny Lyatsky in his 1904 review, ranked the story among Chekhov's finest and praised it as almost a single 'glimpse of hope in the vast panorama of the Russian hopelessness' that Chekhov the short story writer had painted.

Otherwise, "In Exile" was ignored by the contemporary critics; only years later did it start to receive high praise from both the Russian and the foreign critics. "...I have to say that Chekhov does indeed seem to me a fabulous writer. Such stories and In Exile and The Fugitive have no analogues," Katherine Mansfield wrote in December 1920.
