= Mire (short story) =

1886 short story by Anton Chekhov

"Slime" or "Mire" (Russian: Тина, romanized: Tina) is an 1886 story by the Russian writer Anton Chekhov. It was included in his 1888 collection Stories (Рассказы).

== Plot ==
The plot concerns the visit of a lieutenant, Sokolsky, to the house of Susanna Rothstein, the Jewish owner of a vodka distillery, to collect a debt owed to Sokolsky's married cousin Kryukov, but in fact which Sokolsky hopes that Kryukov will lend on to himself so he can marry his fiancée. Susanna entices the lieutenant to supper, then relieves him of the IOUs, but after spending the night with Sokolsky sends him back empty handed. Furious Kryukov resolves to visit Susanna and recover the debt himself, but he likewise is seduced and returns unpaid. A week later Sokolsky departs to return to his fiancée, having borrowed money from his cousin for his own marriage. Left alone Kryukov waits for another week then cannot resist visiting Susanna again, only to find several men being entertained by her, including Sokolsky who has seemingly forgotten about his fiancée. Krykov cannot judge Sokolsky since he is no better.

== Analysis ==
It has been suggested that the portrayal of the Jewish temptress, Susanna Rothstein, may have been influenced by Chekhov's stormy relationship with his former fiancée Dunia Efros, herself Jewish, and who remained on good terms with Chekhov after marrying his friend the Jewish lawyer and publisher Efim Konovitser.

The picture of free-spirited and seductive distillery owner Susanna, and her power over men, was controversial both in Chekhov's time and since, producing varying responses in Chekhov's circle, among critics and also from translators.
