= The Complaints Book =

- Short story by Anton Chekhov
- Original title: Жалобная книга
- Country: Russia
- Language: Russian

Publication
- Published in: Oskolki (1884)
- Publisher: Adolf Marks (1901)
- Publication date: 10 March 1884

"The Complaints Book" (Russian: Жалобная книга, romanized: Zhalobnaya kniga) is a short story by Anton Chekhov, first published in the No. 10, 10 March [old style] 1884 issue of Oskolki, signed A. Chekhonte (А. Чехонте). It was included by the author into the Volume 1 of the Adolf Marks-published Chekhov's Collected Works (1899). The story was translated into Bulgarian and Czech languages during Chekhov's lifetime.

The story's short introductory paragraph informs the reader of a complaints book which is there on the desk at a railway station. There are twenty entries in it, none of them having anything to do with the book's purpose.

Chekhov's story was inspired by the complaints book of one of the stations of the Donetsk Railway that had amused him. Although the names in the story are fictitious, and the author changed some of them when he had his work published, a lost cigarette case in one of the entries is asked to be given to "Andrei Egorich". It is the name of the real postmaster of Voskresensk, the town where Chekhov worked back then.

"The Complaints Book" quickly became popular with a wide range of readers. It became divided into quotations, the most popular of which proved to be its final phrase: "Even if the seventh one, you are still a fool," a reply to the penultimate entry, signed: "Chief station master's deputy, Ivanov the Seventh." It is usually said about somebody who is decorated with titles and honours that do not fit their true nature. It became an idiom in Russian language, and other writers put it in the speech of their characters: this was done, in particular, by Ivan Bunin in the "Inscriptions" and by Alexander Kuprin in "Staff-Captain Rybnikov".

== External list ==
- Жалобная книга. The original Russian text
