= Whitebrow =

- Short story by Anton Chekhov
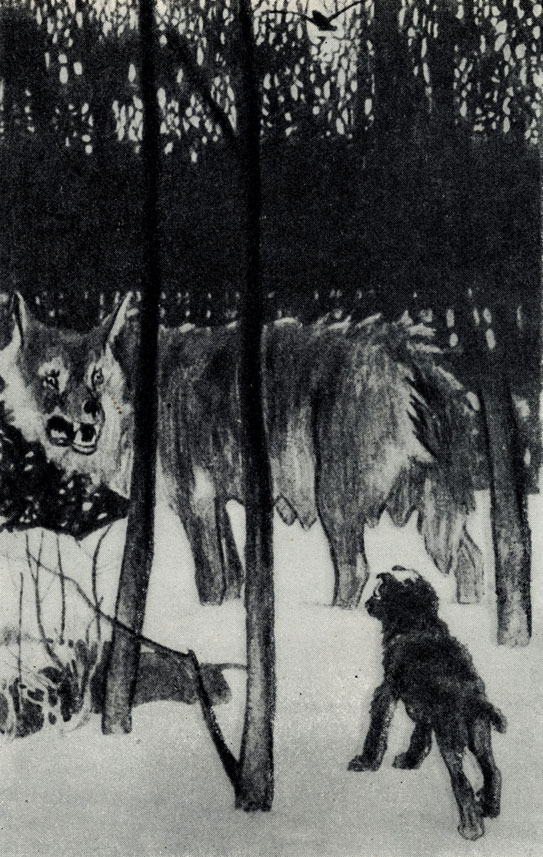
- 1909 illustration by Dmitry Kardovsky
- Original title: Белолобый
- Country: Russia
- Language: Russian

Publication
- Published in: Children's Reading (1895)
- Publisher: Adolf Marks (1901)
- Publication date: November 1895

"Whitebrow" (Russian: Белолобый, romanized: Belolobyi) is an 1895 short story by Anton Chekhov published by Children's Reading (Detskoye Chteniye) magazine.

== Publication ==
Chekhov sent "Whitebrow" to the editor Dmitry Tikhomirov in April 1895, but it was published only in the November 1895 issue of Detskoye Chteniye (Children's Reading), with the illustrations by B.I. Andreyev.

In 1899 it appeared in an anthology called "Russian Writers' Tales of Life and Nature", compiled by M. Vasilyev and the same year came out as a separate edition, published in Moscow by M.V. Klyukin, the publisher who acted initially on Vasilyev's behalf and, apparently, hadn't received the author's permission. "Tell Klyukin that I agreed for Whitebrow to be included into the compilation, but not for it to come out then as a brochure," Anton Chekhov wrote his brother Ivan on 18 January 1899. After some minor revision the story was included by Chekhov into Volume 3 of his Collected Works published by Adolf Marks in 1899–1901.

Sending two of his stories ("Kashtanka" and "Whitebrow") to G.I. Rossolimo for his Library for Children project, Chekhov made the following comment in a 21 January 1900 letter: "What I do have for the young readership, is just two fairytales from doggies' lives, and that is all... Writing specifically for children is something that I haven't learnt, and I do not like the idea of 'children's literature' as such. What's good for the adults to read, should be good for children, too. Andersen, Frigate "Pallada", Gogol are equally admired by children and adults. Rather than write for children specially, we'd rather learn to pick up for them stuff that's already been written for adults: choose the cure and then administer the dose, – this would be more sensible and more honest than try and invent some special treatment for a child only becous he is a child, if I may be excused for this medical analogy."

== Background ==
"In my brother's yard there lived three black dogs, and among them, Whitebrow, a mid-size one, whom my brother immortalizes in his short story [of the same name]," Alexander Pavlovich Chekhov wrote in his 1911 memoirs.

== Plot ==
An old and hungry she-wolf raids a cattle-stall by a winter-hut, which a keeper named Ignat takes care of. She catches what she hopes would be a ewe, but on her way back, recognizes for a pup.

Whitebrow (that's how he's called for a white patch on his head) follows the wolf to her place, to play with her three cubs and spend the next day with them. As the night approaches, the hungry Whitebrow returns home. Here he meets the she-wolf again, who's up there on the stall's roof, ready to jump in. Happy to see her, he barks, jumps on the roof, awakens the dog Agapka, and inadvertently saves an ewe for the second time.

Old man Ignat, who is convinced that it is the pup who for the second night in a row plays havok with the stall's roof, having chosen it as a way of entering the place, expresses a very, very low view on Whitebrow's level of intelligence. Next morning he calls Whitebrow up, smacks him about the ears, and whips him with a twig, repeating: "Go in at the door! Go in at the door!"
