= A Story Without a Title =

- Short story by Anton Chekhov
- Original title: Без заглавия
- Translator: Constance Garnett
- Country: Russian Empire
- Language: Russian
- Genre(s): children literature

Publication
- Published in: Novoye Vremya (1888)
- Publisher: Adolf Marks (1900)
- Publication date: 1 January 1888

"A Story Without a Title" (Russian: Без заглавия, romanized: Bez Zaglaviya) is an 1888 short story by Anton Chekhov.

== Publication history ==
The story was written in late December 1887, immediately after Chekhov's return from St Petersburg to Moscow. Alexander Lazarev-Gruzinsky was staying with the family at the time. "Having finished the story, he read it to [me and Nikolai Pavlovich], then Chekhov's younger brother Mikhail hurried to the Nikolayevsky railway station to send it to [Novoye Vremya] with an express train," he wrote in his memoirs.

"A Story Without a Title" was first published on 1 January 1888 in Novoye Vremya (issue No. 4253), under the title "Fairy Tale" (Сказка). With the new title and numerous stylistic edits, and now devoid of Oriental motifs, which were originally present, it made its way into the charitable collection "For the Victims of Crop Failure", published by the Courier newspaper in 1899.

Unchanged, it was included by Chekhov into Volume 4 of his Collected Works, published by Adolf Marks. During its author's lifetime, the story was translated into Bulgarian, Hungarian, Serbo-Croatian and Czech languages.

== Plot summary ==
In a remote 5th century monastery the monks live and toil, led by an elderly abbot. The old man likes to play the organ, write music and compose Latin verses but is famous most of all for his eloquence and fiery, inspirational monologues which leave everybody around him enchanted. Then one night a drunkard knocks the door of the gates, saying he'd got lost on his way and asking them to give him food and wine. After the supper, instead of thanks, he rather shames the monks for spending their lives away, while the townsfolk keep on drowning themselves in debauchery and vice. The guest's speech sounds offensive, but the abbot sees the point and suggests that he makes a trip to the town himself.

The monks wait for the old man for three months. He returns silent and morose, then spends the next seven days fasting, not playing the organ and weeping. Back from his cell, he tells them the appalling story of the sin raging in the town, its people indulging in all manner of pleasures, drinking wine, visiting brothels, watching lustful harlots dancing on tables. Unfortunately, one of his bouts of inspiration hits him and the monks are transfixed. Having described the charms of evil, the old man curses the devil and departs to shut himself up in his cell. When he comes out in the morning, there is not a monk left in the monastery; they had all fled to the town.
