= Anyuta (short story) =

- Short story by Anton Chekhov
- 1954 illustration by Kukryniksy
- Original title: Анюта
- Country: Russia
- Language: Russian

Publication
- Published in: Oskolki
- Publication date: March 1886

"Anyuta" (Russian: Анюта) is an 1886 short story by Anton Chekhov.

== Publication ==
The story was first published on 5 March (old style: 23 February), in Oskolki magazine's No. 8, 1886 issue, signed A. Chekhonte. In a slightly edited version it made its way into the Motley Stories (Пёстрые рассказы) 1886 collection. Later it was included by Chekhov into Volume 2 of his Collected Works published by Adolf Marks in 1899–1901.

In a 16 (old style: 3) February letter Chekhov informed Nikolai Leykin, hinting at possible problems with censorship: "Now I send you a story. Some student issues are touched in it, but nothing there that would be deemed un-liberal. Besides, isn't it time we'd drop ceremonies?" The story was indeed cut by censors (who felt offended, apparently, by Anyuta's hinted-at promiscuity). "These cuts indeed are insignificant. Thanks for saving my story," Chekhov wrote Leykin on 1 March (old style: 16 February).

== Plot summary ==
Anyuta, a small, tired girl lives with Stepan Klotchkov, a medical student, in squalor, serving for him, besides other things as an anatomy model (for studying ribs, among other body parts). She spends her time taking work as seamstress and, talking little, thinking a lot, mostly of how it happens that all of her former student partners have managed to somehow get out of here to some kind of better life while she is stuck in this place… Rather taken aback by his artist neighbor Fetisov's comments upon the 'unaesthetic' conditions he lives in, Klochkov decides to throw Anyuta out, then lets her stay for another week, out of pity.

== Adaptations ==
In 2019, "Anyuta" was adapted into a short film, "After Anyuta", written by C.C. Kellogg and directed by Clemy Clarke. "After Anyuta" stars Sophie Mae Reppert, Theo Solomon, and Blake Kubena and features cinematography from Irene Gomez Emilsson.
