= The Chorus Girl =

- Short story by Anton Chekhov
- Original title: Хористка
- Country: Russia
- Language: Russian

Publication
- Published in: Oskolki
- Publication date: 18 (old style: 5) July 1886

"The Chorus Girl" (Russian: Хористка, romanized: Khoristka) is an 1886 short story by Anton Chekhov.

== Publication ==
The story was first published in Oskolki's No. 14 (18 July 1886) and was originally titled Pevichka (Певичка). (Note: A derogatory word for a female singer in a cheap entertainment show.) In a radically revised version the story was included in the Posrednik Publishers' 1893 anthology Put-doroga (Путь-дорога, Long Road). Chekhov made some more changes to the text before he included the story in Volume 2 of his Collected Works, published by Adolf Marks in 1899–1901.

During the first revision Chekhov made changes that rendered the story more serious. The critic E.A. Polotskaya commented that "Out of a humorous episode of the life of a promiscuous woman he made a lyrical, sad story of a hard done by and deeply insulted human being," targued.

== Plot summary ==
The singer Pasha's quiet evening with an admirer, Kolpakov, is interrupted by a visitor who reveals that she is Kolpakov's wife. She demands to see her husband, who has hidden in another room, then bombards Pasha with insults and demands that she return all the gifts Kolpakov has given her in order to raise funds to replace the money he has embezzled. Scared and overwhelmed, Pasha gives her all the presents that she has received from all her male guests, though Kolpakov has brought her only two very modest items. After the woman leaves Pasha reproaches Kolpakov, only to be confronted with disdain, as he proclaims: "And this saintly woman was on the verge of throwing herself on her knees before a lowly worm like you! ... For this I shall never forgive myself."
