= Shrove Tuesday (short story) =

- Short story by Anton Chekhov
- 1941 illustration by Kukryniksy
- Original title: Накануне поста
- Country: Russia
- Language: Russian

Publication
- Published in: Peterburgskaya Gazeta
- Publisher: Adolf Marks, 1899
- Publication date: 23 February 1887 (old style)

"Shrove Tuesday" (Russian: Накануне поста, romanized: Nakanune posta, in literal translation, "A day before Lent") is an 1887 short story by Anton Chekhov.

== Publication ==
The story was first published by Peterburgskaya Gazeta, in its No. 52, 23 February (old style) 1887 issue, in the Fleeting Notes (Летучие заметки) section, signed A. Chekhonte. In a revised version (with Pavel Vasilyevich's speeches considerably curtailed and another aunt added) Chekhov included it into Volume 2 of his Collected Works published by Adolf Marks in 1899 (pp. 177–182).

== Plot ==
It is the last day before Great Lent, and the family is busy eating, knowing they'll have to spend the next seven weeks on lean diet. Pavel Vasilyevich is summoned by his wife Pelageya Ivanovna to help out his son Styopa, a high-school boy in the second class, who sits in the nursery, crying over the textbook, having trouble understanding division of fractions, apparently as a result of having eaten too much pancakes. Rather dazed himself after heavy lunch, the father makes a poor job of it and, having totally lost the plot, starts relating his own stories about his school.

Pelageya Ivanovna calls them to the table for tea, where they join her in the company of two aunts (one of whom is mostly silent, another is deaf and dumb) and a midwife. The conversation centers around the superb quality of the jam. Pavel Vasilyevich makes an attempt to return to his school memoirs with the story about a big schoolboy called Mamakhin who terrorized his teachers.

The samovar, the cups, and the tablecloth are cleared away, but the family do not leave the table, waiting now for the supper. The midwife starts hiccupping, while Pavel Vasilyevich and Styopa sit side by side examining a volume of the Niva magazine. The cook, Anna, comes into the dining-room, and asks for forgiveness everybody except the midwife to whom she considers it superfluous to bow down, since she is not one of the gentry.

And then Styopa terrifies his mother with the declaration that he wants to sleep and is going to bed. The boy missing the final supper before Lent is unthinkable, so she rushes to the kitchen to hurry the cook up, and the table is getting laid again, for supper.
