= Oysters (short story) =

- Short story by Anton Chekhov
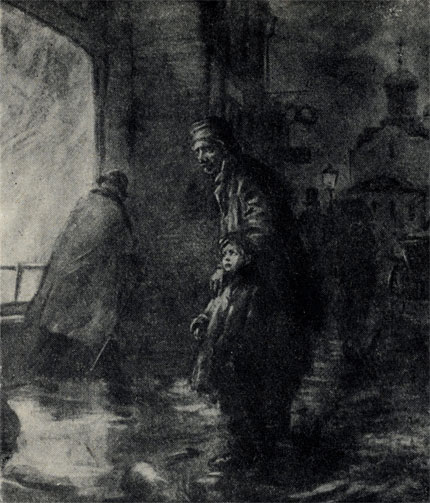
- 1903 illustration by Alexander Apsith
- Original title: Устрицы
- Translator: Robert Long (1908); Constance Garnett (1922)
- Country: Russia
- Language: Russian

Publication
- Published in: Budilnik
- Publication date: 16 December 1884

"Oysters" (Russian: Устрицы, romanized: Ústritsy) is a short story by Anton Chekhov published originally in the No. 486 (16 December), 1884 issue of Budilnik magazine, subtitled "A Sketch" (Набросок) and signed A. Chekhonte (А. Чехонте). It was included (without the subtitle) into Chekhov's 1886 collection Motley Stories (Пёстрые рассказы) published in Saint Petersburg, and in a slightly revised version appeared in this book's next 13 editions, in 1892–1899. It was also included into the Russian Writers' Short Stories 1895 collection and later into the Volume 3 of The Collected Works by A.P. Chekhov's first edition.

In an 18 January 1886 letter to Viktor Bilibin, discussing the stories he'd chosen for the Motley Stories collection, Chekhov wrote: "Hereby I attach one story that had missed the main bulk, you may add it to the others... In it for the first time I've taken upon myself the role of a 'medicus'."

== Synopsis ==
A beggar's child, delirious from hunger, falls victim to a cruel practical joke by the people from the tavern which his father stops nearby to beg for money.
