= Fat and Thin =

- Short story by Anton Chekhov
- Original title: Толстый и тонкий
- Translator: Constance Garnett
- Language: Russian
- Genre: Short story

Publication
- Published in: Oskolki (1883)
- Publisher: Adolf Marks (1899)
- Publication date: October 1883; 142 years ago
- Publication place: Russia

"Fat and Thin" (Russian: Толстый и тонкий, romanized: Tolstyj i tonkyj) is a satirical short story by Anton Chekhov, first published in the No. 40, 1 October 1883 issue of Oskolki magazine, signed A. Chekhonte (А. Чехонте). It was included into Chekhov's 1886 collection Motley Stories (Пёстрые рассказы) published in Saint Petersburg and later in the Volume 1 of the Adolf Marks's Chekhov's Collected Works (1899).

== History ==
The plot of the short story "Fat and Thin" in its original version was based on an anecdote, and the conflict between the characters arose accidentally, due to the involuntary oversight of the "Thin".

The 1886 edition, being in general textually close to the previous edition of 1883, changed the meaning of the story. The motif of official subordination was eliminated: the "Thin" now grovels before the "Fat" without any practical need, "reflexively". The story also received a much greater satirical sharpness and generality.

== Characters ==
Main characters:

- Misha ― the Fat
- Porphyry ― the Thin

Minor characters:

- Louise ― is the wife of Porphyry
- Nathanael ― is the son of Porphyry

== Plot ==
At a railway station the fat one, Mischa, accidentally meets the thin one, Porfiri. The thin man travels accompanied by his wife and son. The two old school friends greet each other in an exuberant and informal manner. A conversation follows, and it is about careers of both of them as government officials. The thin one appears to be an office chairman (Collegiate Assessor in rank) with a low salary, and his wife gives music lessons.

The Fat has become a Privy Councillor and has a greater authority than the Thin. The Thin shrinks, and at once addresses to his school friend as "Your Excellency." The Thick rejects "this respect". The thin man continues to talk in a formal way with his old friend. The Privy Councillor is repelled by such submissiveness: he says goodbye and leaves.

== In culture ==
- The story was adapted into a movie of the same name in 1955.
- A monument to the characters of the story was installed in Taganrog on May 13, 2011 in front of the Museum of Chekhovs' Works (sculptor David Begalov).
- A monument to the characters of the story is set in Yuzhno-Sakhalinsk in 2013, in the park near the Sakhalin International Theater Center.
