= Vanka (short story) =

- Short story by Anton Chekhov
- 1953 illustration by Tatyana Shishmaryova
- Original title: Ванька
- Country: Russia
- Language: Russian

Publication
- Published in: Peterburgskaya Gazeta
- Publication date: 25 December 1886 (old style)

"Vanka" (Russian: Ванька) (Note: Vanka, Van'ka: a diminutive for Ivan) is an 1886 short story by Anton Chekhov.

== Publication ==
The story was first published in Peterburgskaya Gazeta's No. 354 (25 December; new style: 7 January 1887), 1886 issue, in the Christmas Stories section, signed A. Chekhonte (А. Чехонте).

In a slightly revised version, it was included in the 1888 collection Stories (Рассказы, Saint Petersburg) and appeared unchanged in all of its reissues from 1888 to 1899. It made its way into the compilations Children (Детвора, 1889) to be reproduced unchanged in its second and third editions (1890, 1895). In 1900 it appeared with unauthorized cuts in a children's reader, Zolotyie Kolosya (Golden Spikes). Chekhov included the story in Volume 4 of his Collected Works published by Adolf Marks in 1899–1901.

== Synopsis ==
On Christmas Eve, nine-year-old Vanka, an apprentice in the Moscow workshop of the shoemaker Alyachin, secretly writes to his grandfather, Konstantin Makarych, begging to be taken back to the village. Orphaned and sent to Moscow three months earlier, he reports the hunger, beatings, and ridicule in the household. As he writes, he remembers country life. He remembers the farm his grandfather worked on, the dogs, and the kindness of the cook Olga Ignatievna, who taught him practical skills. He addresses the letter simply: "To the village, to my grandfather, Konstantin Makarych," and falls asleep imagining his grandfather reading it by the stove.

== Influence on language ==
The phrase “The village, to grandfather” (Russian: на деревню дедушке) from the story became an idiomatic expression, which refers to sending something to inaccurate, incomplete, unclear, questionable, or non-existent address, where it will not be delivered or answered.
