= Boys (short story) =

- Short story by Anton Chekhov
- 1950 illustration by A. Davydova
- Original title: Мальчики
- Translator: Constance Garnett
- Country: Russian Empire
- Language: Russian
- Genre(s): children literature

Publication
- Published in: Peterburgskaya Gazeta (1887)
- Publisher: Adolf Marks (1899)
- Publication date: 21 December 1887

"Boys" (Russian: Мальчики, romanized: Malchiki) is an 1887 short story by Anton Chekhov.

== Publication ==
The story was first published by Peterburgskaya Gazeta, in the 21 December 1887 (No. 350) issue, subtitled "The Scene" and signed A. Chekhonte (А. Чехонте). Later Chekhov re-worked the finale and included the story into Volume 1 of his Collected Works, published in 1899 by Adolf Marks. In the original newspaper version the mother learns about the boys' plans and they decide to "postpone their trip to America till better times."

== Plot summary ==
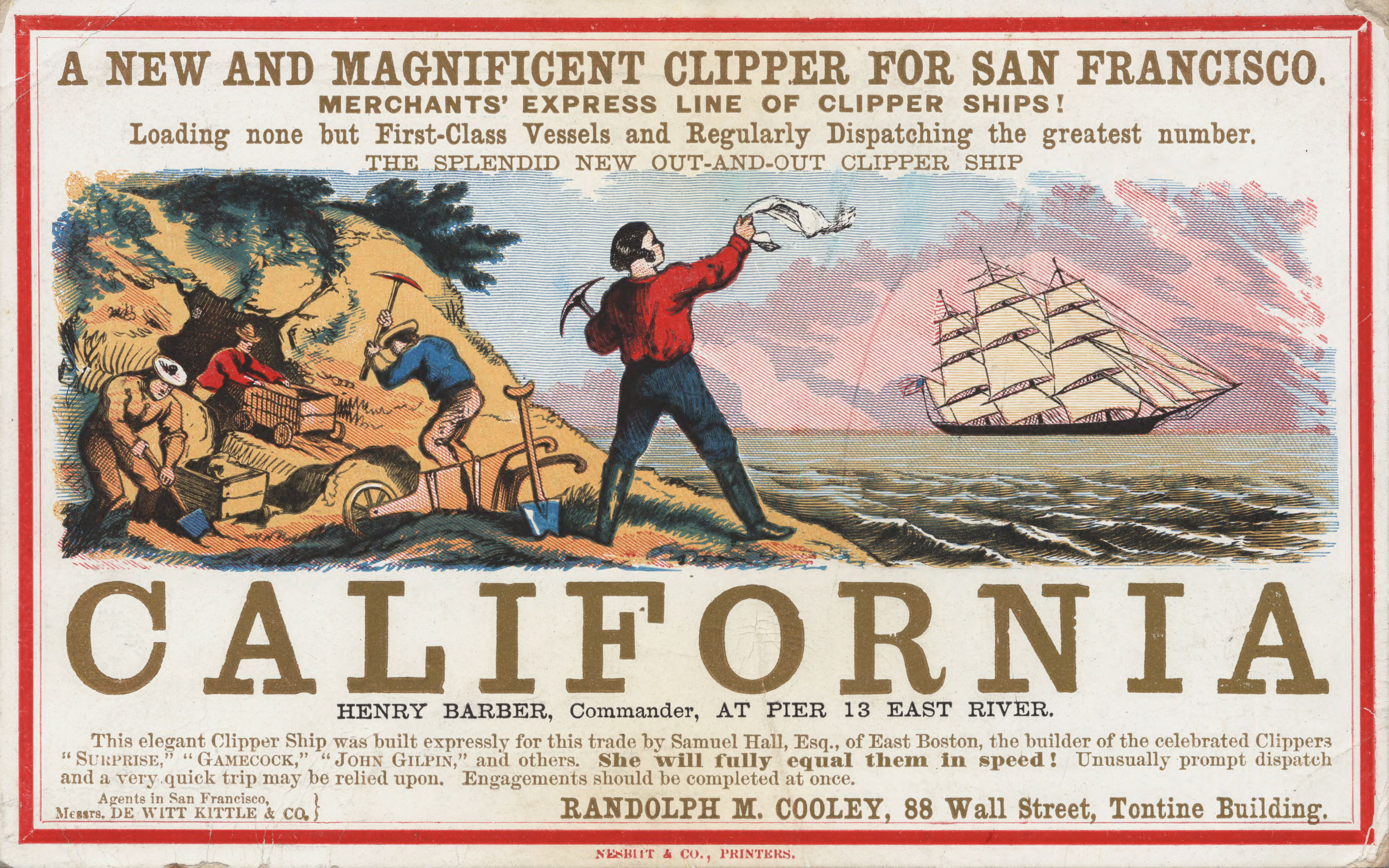
Have you read Mayne Reid?; No, I haven't. But tell me, can you skate?; Tchetchevitsin became lost in thought once more and did not answer her question. He only blew out his cheeks and heaved a sigh as if he were very hot.

Volodya Korolyov, a second-form gymnasium student, arrives home for Christmas holidays, causing uproar and joy in the house. He is accompanied by his school friend Chechevitsyn. Very soon Volodya's sisters Katya, Sonya and Masha start to notice peculiarities in the boys' behavior. Both are absent-minded, look mysterious, rarely answer questions properly and if speak at all, then with enigmatic one-liners, like "In California they drink gin instead of tea."

Later in the evening, after informing Katya that "[w]hen a herd of buffalo gallop across the pampas the whole earth trembles and the frightened mustangs kick and neigh," Tchetchevitsin shocks her even more by revealing that his real name is Montezuma Hawk Claw, the Chieftain of the Invincible. Before going to bed, Katya and Sonya overhear the boys' conversation, and thus learn that they are planning to run away to America in search of gold. Horrified, they decide against telling the mother. "Volodia will bring us gold and ivory from America, but if you tell mamma she won't let him go!" Sonya explains.

The boys' absence is discovered the next day, when it's time to lunch. A search, made throughout the village, brings no result, and the family is desperate. It's only the following morning that the policeman arrives with some papers to be signed, and after him a posting sleigh, transporting the fugitives back home, to everybody's delight. It turns out that the two had been stopped at the hotel in the town, where they were going about asking people where they could buy gunpowder for a pistol that they'd been able to procure beforehand. Chechevitsyn, as an established instigator, is being sent home, but only after he leaves an autograph in the awe-stricken Katya's journal: "Montezuma the Hawk Claw".

== Critical reception ==
Several critics, including A. Basargin (in Moskovskiye Vedomosti) and Viktor Goltsev considered "Boys" to be a fine work. Leo Tolstoy included it in his personal list of Chekhov's best short stories.
