= Three Years =

1895 novella by Anton Chekhov

Three Years (Russian: Три года, romanized: Tri goda) is an 1895 novella by Anton Chekhov originally published in the January and February 1895 issues of Russkaya Mysl. At 130 pages it is Chekhov's second-longest narrative.

Three Years is Anton Chekhov's heartfelt attempt to create a "novel of Moscow life." In it, he paints a poignant portrait of the struggles and frustrations that go hand in hand with human relationships. Away from his native Moscow to care for his ailing sister, Laptev falls instantly in love with Yulia Sergeyevna, the daughter of the local doctor. She in turn feels nothing for him, but convinces herself it would be doing him a gross disservice to refuse his proposal. So begins the unequal marriage between the two, a marriage that will bring a bitter and desperate sorrow to them both. Yet as the years go by, and as they face and overcome tragedy together, they learn to value each other in new ways, and so restore their faith in the redemptive power of time.

The story takes a negative position on the progress of society, featuring individuals of the merchant and factory owner class and their workers, without offering political solutions.

== Background ==
In a September 1894 letter Chekhov informed Maria Chekhova that he was writing "a novel from the Moscow life for Russkaya Mysl. In his December letter to the singer Elena Shavrova (Note: Elena Mikhaylovna Shavrova sent more than twenty of her stories to Chekhov who liked them, reviewed for her and edited. She failed to develop into a serious writer as he hoped she would, but their ten years' correspondence (which started in 1889, when she was 15) resulted in more than 200 letters.) he expressed his dissatisfaction with the way the work was going. "The original idea was one thing, but something different evolves out of it, something more languid... I am sick of writing of all these habitual things, I'd like to write of demons, of frightening, volcanic women, of wizards, but alas! – what they demand of me is right-minded novellas about Ivan Gavrilovichs and their wives."

== Publication ==
The novella came out with significant gaps caused by censorship. "The January issue of Russkaya Mysl has been arrested, then acquitted. From my story the censors threw out everything that had anything to do with religion. Russkaya Mysl is the journal that has to send its articled for the preliminary censorship procedure. Such things kill off all the urge to write, leaves with the feeling of a bone stuck in your throat," Chekhov complained in a January 1895 letter to his friend Alexey Suvorin.

== Critical response ==
Generally the response to the novella was warm, even if some reviewers found the plotline 'hazy' and its characters 'sketchy'. Alexander Skabichevsky reviewed the novella positively and expressed his delight with the Alexey Laptev character whom he described as 'the Hamlet of Zamoskvorechye'.

Along with three other stories and novellas, "The Ward No. 6", "The Story of an Unknown Man" and "A Woman's Kingdom", Three Years served as a turning point in Chekhov's career. The critics started to recognize him as a new major force in Russian literature and 'a worthy heir to the old masters', according to Sergey Andreevsky.
