= Ivan Matveyich =

- Short story by Anton Chekhov
- Original title: Иван Матвеич
- Country: Russia
- Language: Russian

Publication
- Published in: Peterburgskaya Gazeta
- Publication date: 16 (old style: 3) March 1886

"Ivan Matveyich" (Russian: Иван Матвеич) is an 1886 short story by Anton Chekhov.

== Publications ==
"Ivan Matveyich" was first published in Peterburgskaya Gazeta's No. 60 (3 March), 1886 issue, signed A. Chekhonte (А. Чехонте)

An edited version was included in the Motley Stories (Пёстрые рассказы). On 24 March 1899 Pyotr Pertsov, having learnt of the forthcoming Marks publication, suggested that Chekhov include in the Collected Works some stories from the Motley Stories' first edition. Among them was "Ivan Matveyich", which Pertsov called "very good". Chekhov apparently responded to the request and included it in Volume 1 of the Collected Works published by Adolf Marks in 1899–1901.

== Background ==
The story had an autobiographical element to it. Mikhail Chekhov remembered: "This story's hero, Ivan Matveyich, is a true portrait of our brother Ivan, in those days when he, still destitute and before starting to teach, used to cross the whole of Moscow on foot, to Sokolniki, where the writer P. D. Boborykin lived, to copy his texts, the author dictating."

== Summary ==
A 'renowned scientist' ['writer', in the original version] gets more and more exasperated by his young copyist being chronically late. Each day he promises himself to sack Ivan Matveyich, but becomes more and more endeared to this eccentric, destitute, and highly original person.
