= A Tragedian in Spite of Himself =

Play by Anton Chekhov

A Tragedian in Spite of Himself Russian: Трагик поневоле, romanized: Tragik ponyevole, also known as A Reluctant Tragic Hero) is an 1889 one-act play by Anton Chekhov.

== Synopsis ==
In the play, Ivan Ivanovitch Tolkachov asks to borrow a revolver from his friend, Alexey Alexeyevitch Murashkin. Murashkin inquires as to the reason, and Tolkachov complains bitterly about the bad events in his life. Murashkin expresses his sympathy, and then asks Tolkachov to take a sewing machine and a caged canary to Olga Pavlovna, a mutual acquaintance. On hearing Murashkin's request, Tolkachov snaps and begins chasing Murashkin around the room, screaming that he wants blood.
