= The Festivities =

Play by Anton Chekhov

The Festivities (Russian: Юбилей, romanized: Yubilei) is a one-act farce by Anton Chekhov. Written in December 1891, it was first published in May 1892, and is based on his short story "A Defenceless Creature" (Беззащитное существо, 1887).

== Synopsis ==
A bank manager named Andrey Andreyevitch Shipuchin prepares to celebrate the fifth anniversary of the branch office he manages. He arranges for a series of tributes to his supposed expertise, but chaos ensues when his wife returns from a visit to her mother's and a crazy woman comes looking for a job for her husband.
