= The Fish (short story) =

- Short story by Anton Chekhov
- 1941 illustration by Kukryniksy
- Original title: Налим
- Translator: Constance Garnett
- Country: Russia
- Language: Russian

Publication
- Published in: Peterburgskaya Gazeta
- Publisher: Adolf Marks (1899)
- Publication date: 1 July 1885

"The Fish" (translated also as "The Burbot", Russian: Налим, romanized: Nalim), is an 1885 short story by Anton Chekhov.

== Characters ==
- Gerasim, a carpenter, "a tall gaunt peasant, with a curly red head and a face overgrown with hair"
- Lubim, a carpenter, "a young hunchback with a triangular face and narrow Chinese-looking eyes"
- Yefim, a shepherd, "a decrepit old man, with one eye and a crooked mouth"
- Andrey Andreitch, the master
- Vasily, the coachman

== Plot summary ==
On a hot summer day two carpenters, Gerasim and Lyubim, sit in a pond, floundering about in the water under a willow tree, beside the unfinished bathing shed they were supposed to be working on. Blue from cold and wrangling, they struggle to drag a large eelpout by the gills, from under the root.

A herd of cattle appears on the bank, followed by the shepherd Yefim. He joins the company, with his own set of directives on how exactly the fish should be extracted from its hiding. The sounds of panic are heard from the landlord's house: it turns out that the cattle have invaded the garden. The landlord Andrey Andreitch appears, feeling very angry, but, intrigued by the news of an eelpout defying its catchers from under a tree, first orders his coachman Vasily to join the team, then, exasperated with the foursome's incompetence, undresses and goes into the pond himself.

It is Andrey Andreitch who, after all manages to pull the fish out from under a tree. He raises it triumphantly over his head, but then... "The fish makes a sudden upward movement with its tail and the fishermen hear a loud splash . . . they all put out their hands, but it is too late; they have seen the last of the eel-pout."

== Background and publication ==
According to Chekhov's brother Mikhail, the story was based upon a curious real life incident. "I remember clearly how the carpenters in Babkino, working on a bathing-shed, struck upon an eelpout in the pond," he wrote in his book of memoirs.

The story was published for the first time by Peterburgskaya Gazeta, in its 1 July 1885, No.177 issue, subtitled "A Scene" (Сценка) and signed A. Chekhonte (А. Чехонте). It was included in the Motley Stories (Пестрые рассказы) collection, published in 1886 in St Petersburg, and was included by Chekhov into Volume 2 of his Collected Works, published by Adolf Marks in 1899. During Chekhov's lifetime, the story was translated into Polish and Serbo-Croatian languages.
