= At Christmas Time =

- Short story by Anton Chekhov
- Original title: На святках
- Country: Russia
- Language: Russian

Publication
- Published in: Peterburgskaya Gazeta (1900)
- Publisher: Adolf Marks (1903, 1906)
- Publication date: August 1898

"At Christmas Time" (Russian: На святках, romanized: Na svyatkakh) is a 1900 short story by Anton Chekhov.

== Publication ==
On 1 December Sergey Khudekov, the editor and publisher of Peterburgskaya Gazeta sent Chekhov a letter asking for a Christmas story. By late December the story had been finished. It appeared in the No.1, January 1899 edition of this newspaper. With some minor changes Chekhov included it into Volume 12 of the 1903, second edition the Collected Works by A.P. Chekhov, published by Adolf Marks. It then appeared in Volume 11 of the posthumous, 1906 third edition.
