= Papa (short story) =

1880 short story by Anton Chekhov

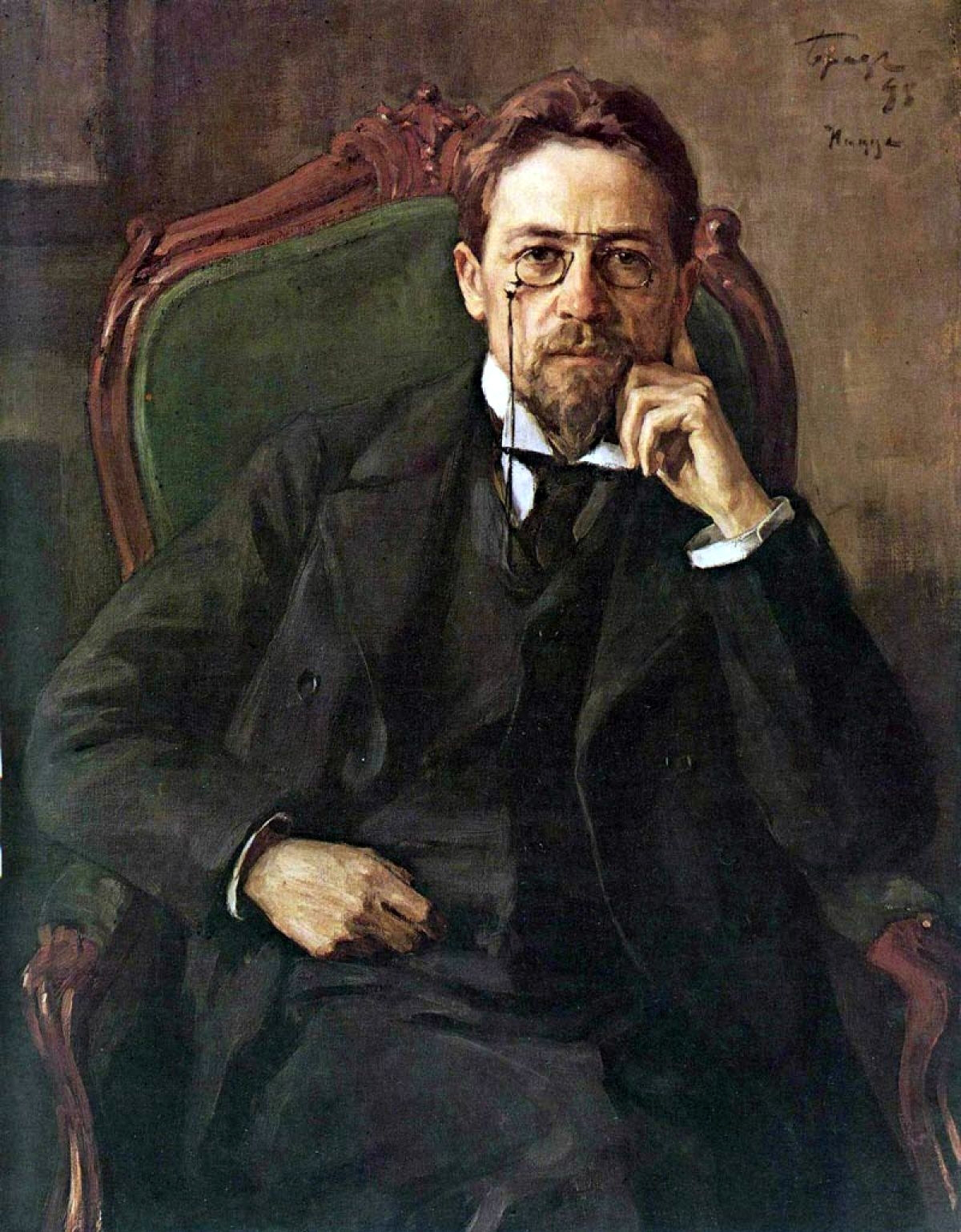
- Portrait of Anton Chekhov in 1898
- Author: Anton Chekhov
- Language: Russian
- Publication date: June 29, 1880

"Papa" (Russian: Папаша) is a short story by the Russian writer Anton Chekhov. Written in 1880, it was first published on June 29, 1880, under the pseudonym "An. Ch." in the twenty-sixth issue of the literary and humorous magazine Strekoza. Censorship approval was obtained on June 26.

In 1882, Chekhov planned to include the story in his collection Shalost (Mischief). For this purpose, minor stylistic revisions were made to the work, along with an important addition—the description of a bribe. The collection was printed but ultimately barred by censors.

The prototype for the mathematics teacher may have been Vladimir Dmitrievich Starov, a teacher at the Taganrog Gymnasium.

== Bibliography ==
- Громов М. П. (1983). "Примечания". In под ред. Н. Ф. Бельчикова (ed.). А. П. Чехов. Полное собрание сочинений и писем в тридцати томах. Vol. 1 (400000 ed.). Москва: Наука. p. 607.
