= The Death of a Government Clerk =

1883 short story by Anton Chekhov

- Short story by Anton Chekhov
- 1955 illustration by Anatoly Bazilevich
- Original title: Смерть чиновника
- Country: Russia
- Language: Russian

Publication
- Published in: Oskolki
- Publication date: 2 July 1883

"The Death of a Government Clerk" (Russian: Смерть чиновника, romanized: Smert chinovnika) is a short story by Anton Chekhov published originally the Oskolki magazine's 2 July, No. 27 issue, subtitled "The Incident" (Случай) and signed A. Chekhonte (А. Чехонте). "Received the "Fragments of Moscow Life" and "The Death of the Government Clerk. Both are delicious", Nikolai Leykin, the Oskolki's editor, informed the author by a 29 June letter. It was included (without the subtitle) into Chekhov's 1886 collection Motley Stories (Пёстрые рассказы) published in Saint Petersburg and featured unchanged in its 2–14 editions (1891–1899).

== Plot ==
Ivan Chervyakov, a petty government official, while in the theatre, sneezes right upon the head of a man sitting in front of him, who happens to be General Brizzhalov, a high-ranking government official. He spends the evening and the next day fawning before his sneeze victim trying to extract forgiveness, but what he succeeds instead is only bringing out a fit of rage in him. Shocked, Chervyakov returns home to lie there and die, due to the sheer stress of having endured such horror.
