= The Chameleon (short story) =

1884 short story by Anton Chekhov

- Short story by Anton Chekhov
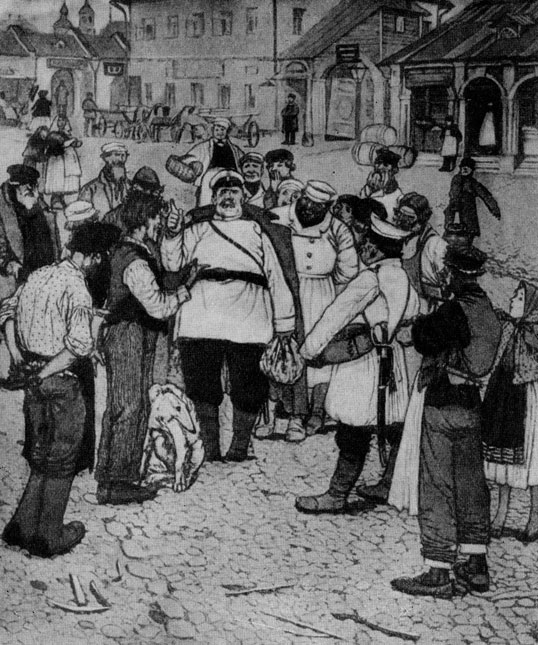
- 1910 illustration by Dmitry Kardovsky
- Original title: Хамелеон
- Country: Russia
- Language: Russian

Publication
- Published in: Oskolki
- Publication date: 8 September 1884

"The Chameleon" (Russian: Хамелеон, romanized: Chamelyeon) is a short story by Anton Chekhov published originally in the No. 36, 8 September 1884 issue of Oskolki magazine, subtitled "A Little Scene" (Сценка), signed A. Chekhonte (А. Чехонте). It was included (without the subtitle) into Chekhov's 1886 collection Motley Stories (Пёстрые рассказы) published in Saint Petersburg and reproduced unchanged in this book's 2–14 editions, in 1891–1899. It was included by Chekhov into Volume 2 of his Collected Works.

== Synopsis ==
Khryukin, a drunkard, has had his finger snapped by a small dog (according to one witness, after thrusting a cigarette stub into the latter). The policeman Ochyumelov's attitude to the affair and the dog's future destiny fluctuates depending upon the coming information as to who the owner of the culprit might be.
