= Chase Two Rabbits, Catch None =

1880 short story by Anton Chekhov

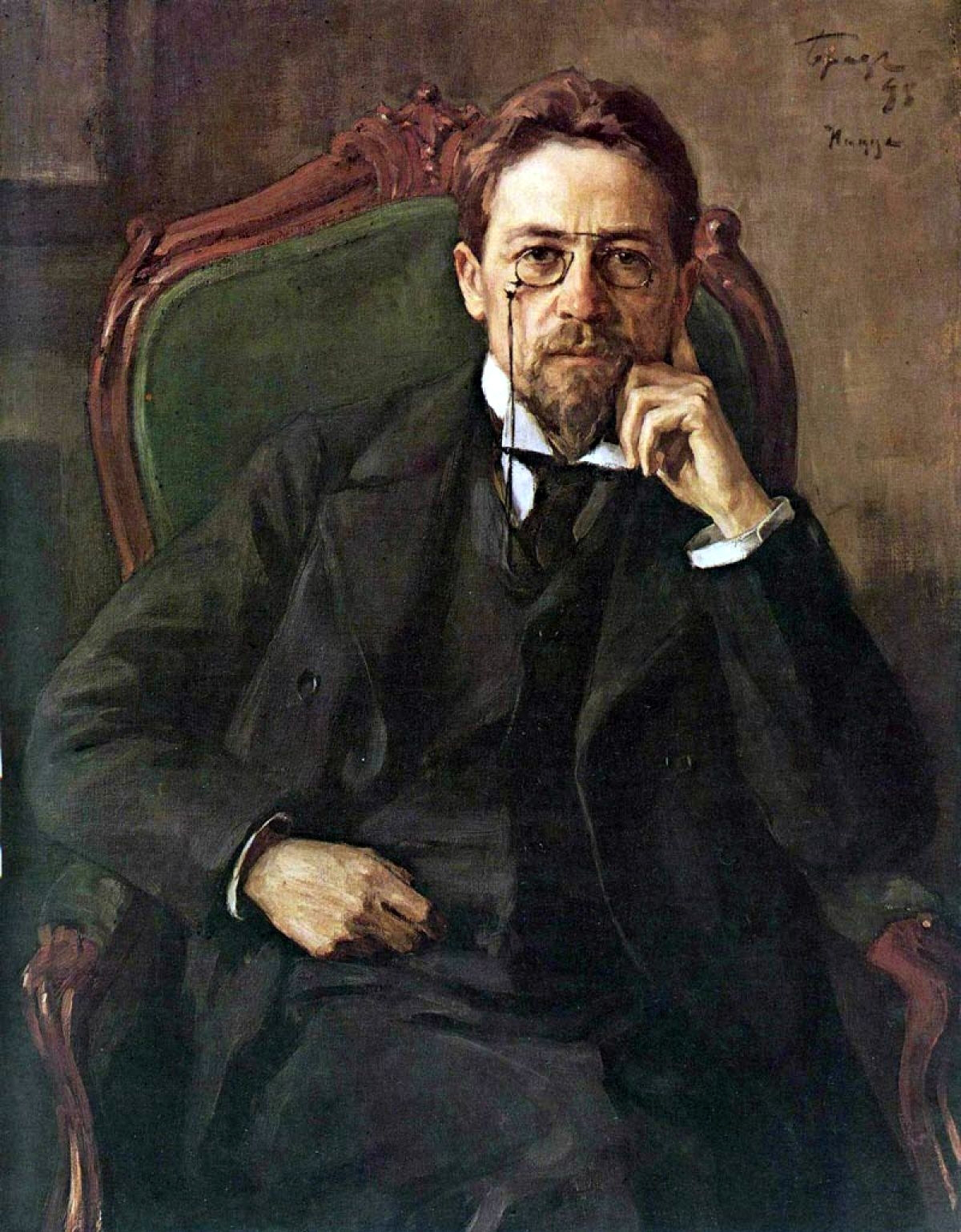
- Portrait of Anton Chekhov in 1898
- Author: Anton Chekhov
- Language: Russian
- Publication date: May 11, 1880

"Chase Two Rabbits, Catch None" (Russian: За двумя зайцами погонишься, ни одного не поймаешь) is a short story by Anton Pavlovich Chekhov, written in 1880 and first published with the subtitle "A Novel in One Part without a Prologue and an Epilogue" under the pseudonym "Chekhonte" on 11 (23) May 1880 in the nineteenth issue of the artistic and humorous magazine "Strekoza". Permission from the censorship committee was obtained on 7 May.

In 1882, Chekhov planned to publish the story as part of his author's collection Mischief. For this purpose, minor changes were made to the work. The collection was printed, but ultimately was not approved by the censors.

The anecdotal plot underlying the story was widespread in the minor press of the late nineteenth century. Such a "family theme" was treated by various authors as a domestic anecdote. Chekhov used this plot in order to depict in detail the everyday life, psychology, and types of the "provincial gentry".

== Bibliography ==
- Gromov, M. P. (1983). "Notes". In N. F. Belchikov (ed.). А. П. Чехов. Полное собрание сочинений и писем в тридцати томах [A. P. Chekhov: Complete Works and Letters in Thirty Volumes] (in Russian). Vol. 1. Moscow: Nauka.
