= Home (short story) =

- Short story by Anton Chekhov
- Original title: Дома
- Country: Russia
- Language: Russian

Publication
- Published in: Novoye Vremya
- Publisher: Adolf Marks (1899–1901)
- Publication date: 7 March 1887 (old style)

"Home" (Russian: Дома, romanized: Doma) is an 1887 short story by Anton Chekhov.

== Publication ==
The story was first published by Novoye Vremya, in this newspaper's No. 3958, 20 (old style: 7) March 1887 issue, Subbotniki (Saturdays) section. It then appeared in an 1887 collection called In the Twilight (В сумерках, Saint Petersburg, in all of its thirteen, 1888–1899 editions) and later Children (Детвора, 1889 anthology). Chekhov included it into Volume 3 of his Collected Works published by Adolf Marks in 1899–1901.

== Synopsis ==
Seryozha, (Note: A diminutive for Sergey) a seven-year old, had been caught smoking, and his father Evgeny Petrovich, a court prosecutor, tries to put it to him how detrimental to one's health this habit is, and how wrong it is to steal somebody else's tobacco. All his efforts to impress his son prove to be futile, until finally, responding to a request, before sending Seryozha to bed, he tells him one of his improvisational fairytales, this one involving a young prince who dies young due to being a smoker and thus fails to fulfill his obligations towards his king father and his kingdom. Profoundly shaken by the tragedy, the boy solemnly decides not to have anything to do with tobacco again.

== Reception ==
The story received no reviews in the contemporary press, but several authors and friends expressed their enthusiasm. "Today read your Subbotnik. Portraying children is what you are a master of", Viktor Bilibin wrote in a 20 (7) March letter.

Dmitry Grigorovich in a January 1888 letter mentioned the story among those which show "how perfectly [their author's] horizon... embraces the motif of love in all its most subtle or hidden manifestations".

The writer and an avid Tolstoyan Ivan Gorbunov-Posadov, who was also the head of the Posrednik publishing company, while discussing one of his future anthologies, gave "At Home" a special mention. "This story had been included [into the list] on my recommendation. For me, this is one of your most profound things. The clash of these two worlds, the pure, humane child's world, and our confused, crippled, deceitful one, in this little, simple piece is shown brilliantly," he wrote in a 29 (old style: 16) May 1893 letter to Chekhov.

Lev Tolstoy included it in his personal list of Chekhov's best stories.
