= The Requiem (short story) =

- Short story by Anton Chekhov
- Original title: Панихида
- Country: Russia
- Language: Russian

Publication
- Published in: Novoye Vremya
- Publication date: 28 (old style: 15) February 1886

"The Requiem" (Russian: Панихида, romanized: Panikhida) is an 1886 short story by Anton Chekhov.

== Publication ==
The story was first published in Novoye Vremya's (o.s.) 15 February, No. 3581, 1886 issue, in the Subbotniks section. With minor changes it made its way into the In the Twilight (В сумерках, V sumerkakh) 1887 collection (to be reproduced in its 2–13, 1888–1899 editions). With several more minor changes it was included by the author into Volume 3 of his Collected Works which were published by Adolph Marks in 1899–1901.

== Background ==
Chekhov, for whom this would be the first publication in Novoye Vremya, originally signed it with his usual pen name A. Chekhonte (А. Чехонте). On 27 (o.s. 14) February he received a telegram from the newspaper asking for the permission to publish it under his real name. "Chekhov gave such a permission, but regretted it, for he was planning to publish something in medical journals and was keeping his real name for serious articles," A.S. Lazarev-Gruzinsky opined in his memoirs.

Answering Suvorin's letter, Chekhov wrote on 6 March (o.s. 21 February): "Thank you for your kind words on my stories and for publishing this one so promptly... I share your opinion considering the finale which you dropped and am grateful for your criticism which I found very constructive. I've been writing for six years now but you are the first editor who'd taken the trouble of proving a perfectly reasonable explanation for the cut you've made."

The dropped finale issue was also mentioned in Viktor Bilibin's early March letter: "I've read your story in Novoye Vremya with great pleasure but failed to notice in it any old spinster that you'd [previously] mentioned." Chekhov's original manuscript has been lost and there is only the Novoye Vremya version of the story that is extant.

== Synopsis ==
Andrey Andreyitch, a shopkeeper, comes to the local village church to ask for prayers for his recently deceased daughter Maria, and is chided by the priest for the wrong kind of language that he'd used in his written request. The shopkeeper's daughter was an actress, and quite a well known one, and he simply fails to understand why the clergymen are so offended by the word ‘harlot’ with which he described her occupation. The rendition of the prayers awaken in Andrey Andreyitch some tender memories of his beautiful, sensitive and intelligent girl, yet even mentally he keeps referring to her as ‘harlot’ for he can't see how an actress could be described otherwise.
