= The Siren (short story) =

- Short story by Anton Chekhov
- Original title: Сирена
- Country: Russia
- Language: Russian

Publication
- Published in: Peterburgskaya Gazeta
- Publisher: Adolf Marks, 1899-1901
- Publication date: 24 August 1887 (old style)

"The Siren" (Russian: Сирена, romanized: Sirena) is an 1887 short story by Anton Chekhov.

== Publication ==
The story was first published in Peterburgskaya Gazeta's No. 231, 24 August (old style) 1887 issue, in the Fleeting Notes (Летучие заметки) section. After drastic stylistic revision (which resulted in the omission of the large bulk of the secretary Zhilin's speech with the description of dishes) Chekhov included it into Volume 1 of his Collected Works published by Adolf Marks in 1899–1901.

== Background ==
According to Alexander Lazarev-Gruzinsky, the story was written in Babkino in the course of one day. Mikhail Chekhov was sure it was the author's experience in Zvenigorod that inspired this story. "While in this town Chekhov regularly attended local government's assemblys and learned a lot about the life of the local clerks," he wrote in his 1923 memoirs.

== Plot ==
External videos
- The Siren. A short Soviet TV film, featuring Viktor Sergachyov as Secretary Zhilin

A group of court officials are stuck in a court room long after the hearings had been closed, waiting for the Chairman to finish writing the account of his 'dissenting opinion'. It is long past dinner time, and they are all extremely hungry. The Court secretary Zhilin starts talking about food, then remembers how once a dream of 'piglet under horse-radish' had sent him into a fit of hysterics. The occasion, apparently repeats himself, for he embarks upon a heated monologue concerning the delights of eating (including some drinking, too), getting more and more passionate, unable to stop, driving everybody in the room mad. One after another, the men rush out, unable to resist the passions his speech had arisen in them. The hapless Chairman is the last to succumb to the temptation, his 'dissenting opinion' gone out of the window.
