= Agafya (short story) =

- Short story by Anton Chekhov
- Original title: Агафья
- Country: Russia
- Language: Russian

Publication
- Published in: Novoye Vremya
- Publication date: March 1886

"Agafya" (Russian: Агафья) is an 1886 short story by Anton Chekhov.

== Publication ==
"Agafya" was first published on 28 (o.s. 15) March 1886 in Novoye Vremya (Issue No. 3607, Saturdays section). In a slightly abridged version, it made its way into the In the Twilight (В сумерках) collection to be reproduced, unchanged, in all its 13 editions (1888–1899). Then it was included by Chekhov into Volume 3 of his Collected Works published by Adolf Marks in 1899–1901.

== Summary ==
Savka, a lazy and strangely introspective man of great physical force and sexual charm, as well as some bizarre habits, is seen as a despicable outcast by the village's male community. Women, though, 'pity' Savka and visit him regularly by night, bringing food and receiving romantic 'hand-outs' which he delivers condescendingly, with contempt mixed with perplexing pity. Agafya, a young railway signalman's wife, is the latest convert to the local sex cult, risking her husband's potentially murderous wrath for several minutes of bliss with a man whom she is apparently in almost religious awe of.

== Critical reception ==
Acclaimed Tamil writer Appadurai Muttulingam has highlighted, in his novel 'Kadavul Thodangiya Idam', how Chekav has used the Indian mythological character Ahalya, that deals with similar themes and issues, in this story.

Nikolai Mikhaylovsky reviewed the In Twilight collection negatively, expressing his dissatisfaction with what he saw as 'uncertain' finales in some of Chekhov's stories, "Agafya", in particular, construing this as a sign of the author's "indifference towards his characters".
