= The Privy Councillor =

- Short story by Anton Chekhov
- 1954 illustration by Kukryniksy
- Original title: Тайный советник
- Translator: Constance Garnett
- Country: Russia
- Language: Russian

Publication
- Published in: Novoye Vremya
- Publisher: Adolf Marks (1899)
- Publication date: 6 May 1886

"The Privy Councillor" (Russian: Тайный советник, romanized: Tainyi sovetnik) is an 1886 short story by Anton Chekhov.

== Publication history ==
The story was first published on 6 May 1886 by Novoye Vremya (Issue No. 3657, pp.2-3). It was included into the 1888 collection Rasskazy (Stories, Рассказы), published in Saint Petersburg. Chekhov included it into the Volume 4 of his Collected Works, published by Adolf Marks in 1899–1901.

During the author's lifetime, "The Privy Councillor" was translated into the German, Slovak and Czech languages. It was Published in Prague in 1892 and proven to be Chekhov's first story to come out there as a separate edition. It was translated into German by Elsa Goeller. Judging by her 9 October 1898 letter (from Prague), at least one episode of the story was considered to be autobiographical. She wrote: "The Privy Councillor is also brilliant, and how I laughed at this episode of your youth!.. The phrase "I won't let her!" from both Fyodor and Pobedimsky, (Note: When Ivan Arkhipovich rather ill-advisedly suggests that Tatyana should accompany him to St Petersburg, her husband's Fyodor cries out: "I won't let her!" This protest is seconded by Pobedimsky, who thus betrays his own secret feelings for the girl and promptly has to pay for it by being also thrown out of the outbuilding and going to hospital with a broken arm.) is just charming."

== Main characters ==
- Andryusha, a little boy and the narrator.
- Klavdiya Arkhipovna, Andryusha's mother and the house owner. Pious and prudent, very proud of her family history and in awe of her brother, she also regards the latter's visit as helpful in terms of the 'protection' her little son might need in the future.
- Egor Pobedimsky, a man of 20, with a "pimply face... a low forehead and an unusually long nose". He was expelled from a veterinary college after half a year for reasons never revealed, and he is considered by the household to be the most intelligent man in the region. The only phrase that he remembers from his time as a student, "The epizootics do the great damage to the stock of this country," serves him as an introduction to any an intelligent discussion.
- Ivan Arkhipovich, a privy councilor. A lively and highly impressionable man, he is also forgetful, absent-minded, and calls Tatyana, a woman he fancies, Pelageya. The fact that she is married to Fyodor, a man whom everybody here is scared of, also chronically slips from his memory.
- Tatyana Ivanovna, the wife of Fyodor Petrovich, the estate's manager. "A plump little woman of twenty" who is always silent and never laughs, she makes a striking impression upon the high-ranking guest.
- Fyodor Petrovich, the farm's bailiff, unruly, rude and haughty. Loves his wife passionately but is never tender to her, and very jealous. Klavdiya Arkhipovna is a bit wary of Fyodor, but still likes him, for, "in spite of his gypsy nature" (and Fyodor is indeed of the Roma origins), he is "ideally honest and industrious."

== Plot summary ==
Klavdiya Arkhipovna is greatly excited: her brother Ivan Arkhipovich Gundasov, who is a privy councillor, with the rank of a general, has informed her in a letter that due to financial difficulties, instead of his usual trip to Marienbad he was going to spend the summer with her and her family in their Kochuyevka village. Much effort goes into the preparations, most of the culinary order. The house is cleaned, washed and turned inside out, and the boy, Andrey, and his tutor Pobedimsky receive new costumes, made by the local tailor.

Upon his uncle's arrival the boy is disappointed. The general does not look at all like a fierce war fighter with a sabre as he'd imagined him to be. He is a youngish middle-aged infatuated with Tatyana Ivanovna, the wife of the estate's manager Fyodor.

So as to accommodate the guest and his lackey properly, the boy and his teacher are moved to the couple's lodge. Here the foursome amuse themselves by singing, much to the delight of the general, who makes it a habit to visit them regularly. The idyll goes pear-shaped one evening when the latter, having forgotten that she has a husband, asks Tatyana (whom he insists on calling Pelageya Ivanovna) to go with him to Saint Petersburg. The outraged Fyodor Petrovich, who is present, first throws the general out of the outbuilding. Then Pobedimsky, who rather stupidly betrays his own feelings towards Tatyana Ivanovna, is thrown out as well. Klavdiya Ivanovna offers his brother three thousand rubles for him to travel to Marienbad, after all.
