= An Enigmatic Nature =

- Short story by Anton Chekhov
- Original title: Загадочная натура
- Translator: Constance Garnett
- Country: Russia
- Language: Russian
- Genre(s): humour, satire

Publication
- Published in: Oskolki (1883)
- Publisher: Adolf Marks (1899)
- Publication date: 19 March 1883

"An Enigmatic Nature" (Russian: Загадочная натура, romanized: Zagadochnaya natura) is an 1883 short story by Anton Chekhov.

== Publication ==
The story was first published in the humorous magazine Oskolki on 19 March 1883, signed A. Chekhonte. It made its way into the collection called Motley Stories (1886) and, with some stylistic revision, was later included into Volume 1 of Chekhov's Collected Works, published by Adolf Marks in 1899. During its author's lifetime, "An Enigmatic Nature" was translated into Bulgarian, German, Polish, Serbo-Croatian, Czech, Finnish and Swedish languages.

== Plot summary ==
In a train compartment, Voldemar, a provincial secretary of Special Commissions, who is also a budding young author, talks to an agitated young lady, reclining on a seat opposite to him. He is fascinated with the great enigma of her apparently wonderful inner world, eager to unravel its mysteries, and she, a self-proclaimed 'sufferer in Dostoyevsky's taste' implores him to reveal her soul to the world in one of his novellas.

So she tells him how she, a young girl, looking for brighter horizons, married an old army general, so as to become an heiress one day and, with all the wealth thus gained, go back to the man whom she really adored. Now, according to the plan, the general dies, but no happiness comes her way, for there is now a serious hurdle that stands between her and the man she loves. And that is… another army general, who is both rich and old.

As the train leaves the station, Voldemar the writer sits pondering on how indeed enigmatic this wonderful creature's soul must be.
