= A Living Chronology =

- Short story by Anton Chekhov
- Original title: Живая хронология
- Country: Russia
- Language: Russian

Publication
- Published in: Oskolki
- Publication date: 7 February 1885

"A Living Chronology" (Russian: Живая хронология, romanized: Zhivaya khronologiya) is a short story by Anton Chekhov published originally in the No. 8, 23 February 1885, issue of Oskolki magazine, signed A. Chekhonte (А. Чехонте). It appeared in the 1886 collection Motley Stories (Пёстрые рассказы), and was later included by Chekhov into Volume 2 of his Collected Works, published by Adolf Marks in 1899–1901.

== Synopsis ==
Having a quiet evening by the fire with his wife and a friend, the State Councilor Sharamykin complains about the recent quietness of their town's cultural life and remembers how stormy things had been here in the past, and how much his wife Anna Pavlovna enjoyed it. Each time, going back in his memories to another star's visit to this place, in order to recall the exact year, he has to consult her as to the age of one of their four children.
