= A Gentleman Friend =

Short story by Anton Chekhov

- Short story by Anton Chekhov
- Original title: Знакомый мужчина
- Country: Russia
- Language: Russian

Publication
- Published in: Oskolki
- Publisher: Adolf Marks (1899)
- Publication date: 3 May 1886

"A Gentleman Friend" (Russian: Знакомый мужчина, romanized: Znakomyi muzhchina) is a short story by Anton Chekhov originally published on 20 April (o.s. 3 May) 1886 in Oskolki (Issue No. 18), titled "A Little Bit of Pain" (Немножко боли) and signed A. Chekhonte (А. Чехонте). On 6 July (o.s. 23 June) it was reprinted, unchanged, by Novosti Dnya (Daily News). Under the new title it was included by Chekhov into Volume 1 of his Collected Works, published by Adolf Marks in 1899–1901.

== Background ==
The story at least to some extent came about as a response to the letter Chekhov received from Viktor Bilibin who suggested: "[What about a story about] a decent guy who finds himself broke, visits a friend to borrow money but finds it impossible to make such a request and leaves the place without asking?"

== Synopsis ==
A lovely young woman named Wanda (Note: "Nastasya Kanavkina by her passport...", which means 'Wanda' is an assumed name. 'Kanavkina' is a derivative from 'Kanava', 'a ditch'; a 'speaking' surname, apparently allowing the author to make an assumption as to his heroine's future.) finds herself penniless after leaving a hospital. She decides to visit a man she recently met in a café (who, she mistakenly hopes, would instantly recognize her) to ask for money. The man, who proves to be a dentist, asks her to take her place in a chair and starts examining the state of her teeth. Disheartened by the lack of recognition on his behalf, as well as her own unprepossessing appearance in the mirror, she, rather than asking for money, agrees to have her bad tooth pulled out and pays her last ruble for this. Happily, next day she meets another fine gentleman in the same café, a rich merchant from Kazan, and gets her financial position reasonably improved.
