= Misery (short story) =

1886 short story by Anton Chekhov

- Short story by Anton Chekhov
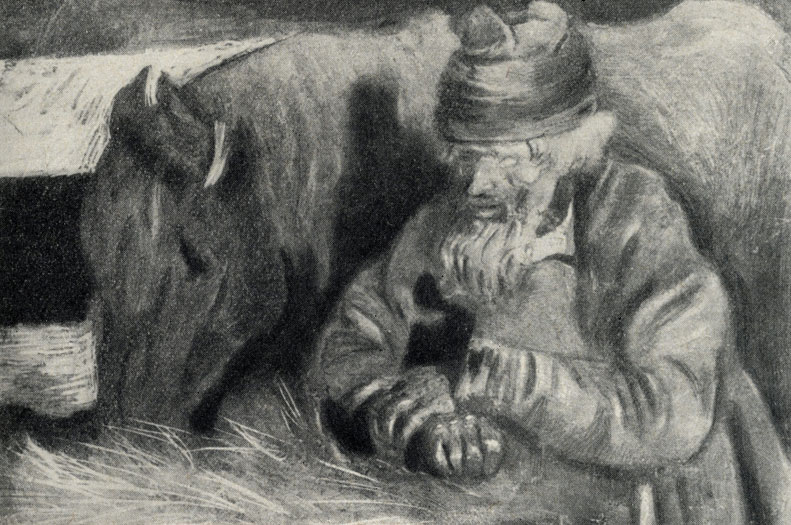
- 1903 illustration by M. Efimov
- Original title: Тоска
- Country: Russia
- Language: Russian

Publication
- Published in: Peterburgskaya Gazeta
- Publication date: 26 April 1886

"Misery" (Russian: Тоска, romanized: Toska) is an 1886 short story by Anton Chekhov.

== Publication ==
The story was first published in Peterburgskaya Gazeta's No. 26, 16 January (old style) 1886 issue, signed A. Chekhonte (А. Чехонте). With minor changes it appeared in the collection Motley Stories (Пёстрые рассказы). In 1895 it made its way into an anthology called Probleski (Проблески, meaning "Glimpses"). Chekhov included a slightly revised version of the story in Volume 3 of his Collected Works published by Adolf Marks in 1899–1901.

== Synopsis ==
The cabman Iona's son recently died. He desperately and unsuccessfully tries to have a talk with the people he meets and tell them of how shattered he is. He ends up talking to his horse.

== Reception ==
The story was positively reviewed by Peterburgskiye Vedomosti (No. 167, 1886) and N. Ladozhsky. Leonid Obolensky, writing for Russkoye Bogatstvo, praised Chekhov for his extraordinary ability to see the hidden drama behind deceptively simple things, and cited "Misery" as a perfect example of that. Konstantin Arsenyev, in an essay called "The Writers of Our Times" (Vestnik Evropy, No.12, 1887) included "Misery" in his list of the best contemporary short stories. Leo Tolstoy included "Misery" in his personal list of Chekhov's best stories.
