= A Horsey Name =

- Short story by Anton Chekhov
- Illustration by Kukryniksy, 1954
- Original title: Лошадиная фамилия
- Translator: Marian Fell (1915)
- Country: Russian Empire
- Language: Russian
- Genre: humour

Publication
- Published in: Peterburgskaya Gazeta
- Publisher: Adolf Marks (1899)
- Publication date: 7 July 1885

"A Horsey Name" (Russian: Лошадиная фамилия, romanized: Loshadinaya familiya) is an 1885 short story by Anton Chekhov.

== Background and publication ==
According to the writer and memoirist Vladimir Bogoraz, the plotline might have had to with a popular Taganrog anecdote, based on a real life incident when "...the two men, Zherebtsov and Kobylin, (Note: The first one comes from zherebets (жеребец, stallion) and the second from kobyla (кобыла, mare).) well-off, and known in the city, checked into a hotel simultaneously, and their names appeared on the desk, side by side. I remember well how the whole of Taganrog laughed."

The story was published for the first time by Peterburgskaya Gazeta, in its No. 183, 7 July 1885, issue, subtitled "A Scene" (Сценка) and signed A. Chekhonte (А. Чехонте). It was later included by Chekhov into Volume 2 of his Collected Works, published by Adolf Marks in 1899. During Chekhov's lifetime, it was translated into Polish, Czech and Serbo-Croatian languages. Its first English translation, by Marian Fell, appeared in the 1915 collection called Russian Silhouettes: More Stories of Russian Life.

== Plot summary ==
The retired general Buldeyev, suffering from a toothache, has tried all possible means of treating it, to no avail. He is not willing, though, to remove the tooth, so some cure is to be found. The steward, Ivan Evseyevich, remembers he knew once an extremely gifted 'tooth conjurer', who used to just 'turn toward the window and spit, and the pain would go in a minute". Now living in Saratov, the wonder doctor makes his living by spit-related way of tooth-healing, which he does even by telegraph.

The general's initial reaction is skeptical, but his wife manages to persuade him that sending a telegram to Saratov at least won't kill him. The steward reckons that "every dog knows this man in Saratov", so the address won't be necessary, mentioning his name would do. And that is where the problem arises. He remembers his first name is Yakov, but cannot recall the surname. One thing he is sure of, it has something to do with... horses.

The two start to look through all possible variants. Soon the family and the whole of the household join in. The agonized general promises to pay five rubles to anyone who would help Ivan Evseyevich to recall the surname, but nothing comes out of it. He loses his patience, sends for the dentist, the tooth gets pulled out, and this brings relief.

On his way back to the city, the doctor meets the steward by the roadside. His eyes are fixed on the ground and he is muttering something to himself. The dentist asks if he could buy from him a load of hay. Ivan Evseyevich glares at the doctor, then without uttering a word rushes to the house. "I've remembered the name, your Excellency! Thanks to the doctor. Hayes! (Note: According to Marian Fell's translation. In Russian its Ovsov (Овсов) coming from "овёс", which is "oat". Some later translations give the English variant as Oates, which perfectly suits the original. "Hay" is "seno" (сено) in Russian.) Hayes is the exciseman's name!" he cries, only to be contemptuously sent away.
