= A Malefactor =

- Short story by Anton Chekhov
- The 1941 illustration by Kukryniksy
- Original title: Злоумышленник
- Translator: Constance Garnett
- Country: Russia
- Language: Russian

Publication
- Published in: Peterburgskaya Gazeta
- Publication date: 7 August 1885
- Published in English: 1919

"A Malefactor" (Russian: Злоумышленник, romanized: Zloumyshlennik) is an 1885 short story by Anton Chekhov.

== Publication ==
"A Malefactor" was first published in the 7 August (o.s. 24 July) 1885 (No. 200) issue of Peterburgskaya Gazeta, in its Fleeting Notes section, subtitled "A Little Scene" (Сценка) and signed A. Chekhonte (А. Чехонте). The story was included into the 1886 collection Motley Stories (Пёстрые рассказы), to be reproduced unchanged in all of its 14 editions, and later into Volume 3 of the original edition of the Collected Works by A.P. Chekhov, published by Adolf Marks in 1899–1901.

== Background ==
Vladimir Gilyarovsky maintained that the prototype for the character of Denis Grigoryev was a peasant named Nikita Pantyukhin, from the village Kraskovo in Moscow Governorate. "Anton Pavlovich was trying to put it to him that one was not supposed to unscrew nuts off railroad tracks, which could cause train crash, but Nikita seemed to be unable to understand him... 'Sure I know what's allowed, what's not. Sure, it's not everywhere that I unscrew them: one here, another there,' he was repeating," Gilyarovsky wrote. According to him, Chekhov had written down some words and expressions used by the real life 'malefactor' and then reproduced them in his story.

Lev Tolstoy included "A Malefactor" in his list of Chekhov's best stories. In Chekhov's lifetime the story was translated into Bulgarian, Hungarian, German, Serbo-Croatian, Slovak and Czech languages.

== Synopsis ==
A local investigating magistrate unsuccessfully tries to explain that it is wrong to take iron nuts off the railroad track to a peasant, Grigoryev, who simply cannot see why he's to be deprived of his right to use an iron nut as a weight for his fishing line.
