= Sleepy (short story) =

- Short story by Anton Chekhov
- 1953 illustration by Tatyana Shishmaryova
- Original title: Спать хочется
- Country: Russia
- Language: Russian

Publication
- Published in: Peterburgskaya Gazeta
- Publisher: Adolf Marks (1900)
- Publication date: 25 January 1888 (old style)

"Sleepy" (Russian: Спать хочется, romanized: Spat khochetsya) is an 1888 short story by Anton Chekhov.

== Publication ==
Chekhov wrote the story in the course of one day, while working upon The Steppe, so as to 'get some money to deal with the beginning-of-the-month payments', as he explained to Alexey Pleshcheyev in a 23 January letter. It was first published in Peterburgskaya Gazeta's No. 24, 25 January 1888 issue, signed A. Chekhonte (А. Чехонте). In a shortened version and with re-written finale it then appeared in a collection called Gloomy People (Хмурые люди, Khmurye lyudi, 1890). Chekhov included it into Volume 5 of his Collected Works, published by Adolf Marks in 1899–1901.

== Plot ==
Varka, a 13-year-old babysitter, sits all night long by the cradle trying desperately not to fall asleep, knowing she will be severely beaten by her masters for neglecting her work. Once she nods off and is punished. The sleepless night by a screaming baby draws on and on, as the girl, eyes half-open, recalls the horrors of her past: her father dying of a hernia and her mother begging for food by the road. The sleepless night having ended, there comes the day full of dirty little jobs and ceaseless errands. After that, another night by the screaming baby. Now almost delirious, the girl starts to believe that the true root of evil in her wretched life is the screaming infant. Greatly relieved by having found an easy solution, she strangles the baby, then "...quickly lies down on the floor, laughs with delight that she can sleep, and in a minute is sleeping as sound as the dead".
