= Grisha (short story) =

- Short story by Anton Chekhov
- Original title: Гриша
- Country: Russia
- Language: Russian

Publication
- Published in: Oskolki
- Publication date: 18 April 1886

"Grisha" (Russian: Гриша) is an 1886 short story by Anton Chekhov.

== Publication ==
The idea for the story was suggested to Chekhov by Viktor Bilibin, who in a 14 March 1886 letter wrote: "[What about] the psychology sketch of a small boy, 2, 3 or 4 year old? In a short story?" It was first published on 18 (o.s.: 5) April in the No. 14, 1886 issue of Oskolki magazine. In a slightly revised version it was included by Chekhov into Volume 1 of his Collected Works published in 1899–1901 by Adolf Marks.

== Synopsis ==
A boy of two years and eight months makes his first foray into the outside world in the company of his somewhat wayward nanny and is quite overwhelmed by various stimuli. This includes cats, soldiers, and the conversation between his nanny and her friends, one of whom gives him his first taste of alcohol. After returning home Grisha's mother observes that he has a fever, which she treats with a dose of castor oil.
