= First Aid (short story) =

- Short story by Anton Chekhov
- 1954 illustration by Kukryniksy
- Original title: Скорая помощь
- Country: Russia
- Language: Russian
- Genre(s): dark humour

Publication
- Published in: Peterburgskaya Gazeta
- Publisher: Adolf Marks, 1899-1901
- Publication date: 22 June 1887 (old style)

"First Aid" (Russian: Скорая помощь, romanized: Skoraya pomoshch) is an 1887 short story by Anton Chekhov.

== Background and publication history ==
According to Mikhail Chekhov, the story was based upon the author's experience during his stay in the village of Babkino. In the 27 June 1884 letter from Voskresensk to Nikolai Leykin, Chekhov related one occasion from his practice as a doctor, several details of which proved to be close to those described in the story.

"First Aid" was first published on 22 June 1887 by Peterburgskaya Gazeta (issue No. 168), signed A. Chekhonte (А. Чехонте). Chekhov revised the text before including the story into the collection Nevinnye rechi (Невинные речи, Innocent Speeches), making the scribe a pathetically pompous figure, and adding more comic elements to an otherwise tragic story. Later he included it into volume one of his Collected Works published by Adolf Marks in 1899-1901.

== Main characters ==
In the order of appearance:

- Gerasim Alpatych, a local starshina. Heavily drunk, he is unable to say a word no matter how hard he tries.
- Egor Makarych, a scribe. Decides to take the 'investigation' into his own hands. Comes up with the idea that the water should be 'pumped out' of the old man by way of throwing him up repeatedly into the air.
- Fyodor, 'the drowned man'. Sits on the bank, legs apart and repeats the same thing over again and again, about a guy who'd hired him as mason-plasterer, and demanded that he should respect him as if he were his own father for a wage of mere seven rubles. Alive before the 'resuscitation', dead after it.
- Anisim, the man who'd rescued the old man first time round. It is his remark, though ("...Only in the name is he alive, look closer, and he's already turned blue") that prompts the scribe to start the 'pumping out' procedure.
- Landowner, arrives at the scene late, with her manager Etienne (real name Stepan Ivanych). Orders the villagers to stop immediately 'this pumping out business' because "this is regarded as superstition nowadays" and demands that the old man should be given proper artificial respiration treatment (by way of "rolling him about and pressing his stomach and chest") as well as intensive rubbing. Her suggestion that the old man should "be given burnt feathers to sniff and be tickled" proves to be the final one.

== Plot summary ==
The (unspecified) religious holiday has started, the villagers are drunk, and there's already been an accident. An old man from the neighbouring area had decided to cut his way short, staggered into the river, got himself into the vortex, started to yell and was rescued by the local man, Anisim. The old man (whom everybody refers to as 'the drowned one') seems to be more or less all right: he sits on the bank, muttering gibberish, being apparently severely intoxicated. The men around him, though, take this for the sign that "the soul half-left his body" and are very keen to bring 'the drowned one' to life, by throwing him up into the air on a burlap, as well as performing the 'artificial respiration' routine (which nobody knows apparently how to do properly). After a prolonged procedure which looks more like torture, the 'drowned one' is pronounced dead.

== Reception ==
According to S.T. Semyonov, who wrote a book of memoirs on Leo Tolstoy, the latter, while praising Chekhov the humourist, considered some of his humour difficult to understand, citing "First Aid" as an example.

A. Basargin, reviewing the first volume of Chekhov's Complete Works, mentioned "First Aid" as the story "that depicts the helplessness of our peasants when it comes to all things medical."
