= Ariadne (short story) =

- Short story by Anton Chekhov
- Original title: Ариадна
- Country: Russia
- Language: Russian

Publication
- Published in: Russkaya Mysl (1895)
- Publisher: Adolf Marks (1901)
- Publication date: December 1895

"Ariadne" (Russian: Ариадна) is an 1895 short story by Anton Chekhov.

== Publication ==
The story was first published in the December 1895 issue of Russkaya Mysl.

It was originally intended for The Artist magazine, but in a 13 March 1895 letter Vukol Lavrov informed Chekhov that the magazine had gone bankrupt and asked for the permission to publish the story. The author's first reaction was half-negative. "I do not believe this story would suit Russkaya Mysl at all. I send you this story, please read it and give Viktor Alexandrovich to read. Should you agree with me, please send it back, otherwise you may publish it but no sooner than another story ["Murder"] that I will soon send you," Chekhov wrote in a 17 March letter. Lavrov and Goltsev disagreed. "We've read your story. Of course we'll have it with great pleasure. Thank you very much for it," Lavrov informed Chekhov on 12 April.

With minor changes it was included by Chekhov into Volume 9 of his Collected Works published by Adolf Marks in 1899–1901.

== Background and prototypes ==
At least three women might be said to have served as prototypes for the story's main heroine. The first one, chronologically (and according to Yuri Sobolev who was the first to maintain this connection), was Ariadna Charets (who also shared the patronym Grigoryevna with the character), a daughter of the Taganrog City Gymnasium inspector Grigory Cherets. A beauty and a heartbreaker, who loved partying and quite enjoyed herself in the company of men, she caused great suffering to her husband, V.D. Starov, a teacher of Latin at the same school, who, in his own turn, served as a prototype for Nikitin in "The Teacher of Literature". According to A. Drossi Chekhov knew Ariadna Charets personally and was fond of her, but sympathized also with Starov, whom he met on several occasions in 1887, during his visit to Taganrog. Sobolev considered Ariadna Charets to have been also the prototype of Masha Shelestova ("The Teacher of Literature"). Later scholars came to agree that while "Ariadna" provided the true portrait of a Taganrog beauty, "The Teacher of Literature" had to do more with the factual side of the early years of her marital life.

Literary historians disagree about who "the real Prince Maktuyev" might have been. Some name Count Kochubey, who was said to be Ariadna Cherets' patron, others point at Prince Pavel Maksutov, a Governor of Taganrog in 1876–1882.

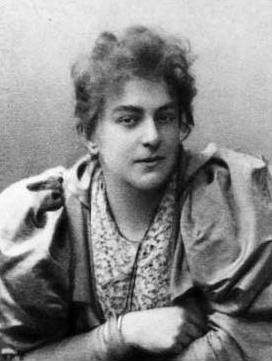
Lika Mizinova, Chekhov's close friend in early 1890s, is considered to be one of the prototypes for the story's heroine

To a certain extent the story might be seen as a reflection of Chekhov's relationship with Lika Mizinova and the events of her life in 1893–1895. In the story, the heroine, scornful of her timid suitor's indecisiveness, gets involved with an "experienced" lover and with him goes abroad while Shamokhin is away. In a similar manner, with Chekhov absent, in Yalta, Mizinova (his then beau) fell for Ignaty Potapenko, a married man with a reputation of womanizer, who was admired by ladies and "knew well how to love them, too", according to Nemirovich-Danchenko. and with him went to Europe. In several months' time, she started to shower Chekhov with letters complaining about how Ignatenko, a "treacherously unfaithful man" had left her behind and "fled to Russia". From her 21 September letter Chekhov surmised that she was pregnant. Some phrases from Mizinova's letters ("...Do not forget the one whom you've forsaken") are reproduced in those by Ariadna almost word by word. This apparently was the reason why Chekhov (still fresh from the scandal caused by "The Grasshopper") had doubts about publishing the story in Russkaya Mysl and suggested that Viktor Goltsev (a close friend of both Mizinova and Potapenko) should decide himself whether it was suitable for the magazine.

Meanwhile, after the publication of the story in Russkaya Mysl, in the circle of Chekhov's Moscow friends the rumours started to circulate that the real woman behind the Ariadna character was not Mizinova, but the actress Lydia Yavorskaya. The journalist Nikolai Yezhov in his 28 December 1895 letter told Chekhov that he'd "found ridiculous such insinuations spread by the most insightful part of our readership", but in his 1909, Istorichesky Vestnik-published memoirs he would make a lot of them, calling the author a man prone to "petty vindictiveness". In 1915 Ezhov repeated his accusations in the article on Alexey Suvorin. The Chekhov memoirist Alexander Lazarev-Gruzinsky vehemently protested against such assertions but later other critics had to concede that Yavorskaya (whose relationships with Chekhov in early 1890s have been described as "complicated" by the memoirist Tatyana Shchepkina-Kupernik) was exactly the Ariadna type of a flashy, insincere woman, whose only motivation in life seemed to be achieving personal success.

The chronology of the European events in the story has to do with Chekhov's own travels. In the spring of 1891 he visited (like his characters did) Venice, Bologna, Florence, Rome, Naples and Paris. Also in 1894 he was in Yalta and made part of his journey abroad on board of steamboat Sevastopol-Odessa.

== Plot ==
Travelling from Odessa and Sevastopol, the narrator on board the steamboat meets a man called Ivan Shamokhin, who tells him a story of his love for a woman named Ariadna Kotlovich. Initially he is just dazzled by her beauty, gracefulness, originality, wit and intelligence; to him she is an epitome of perfection. Gradually he comes to realize that there is vanity and coldness behind her shiny charisma. She loves seeing Shamokhin around, but only because the fact that a young man so attractive and virtuous is so obviously infatuated with her, gives her great pleasure. His attempts at escaping are all in vain: he is now totally under the spell of Ariadna... As seems to be prince Maktuev, "a wealthy man but an utterly insignificant person" whom she had once refused and (as it later turns out) has never been able to forgive herself for that.

Sick of her Russian rural environment and (what she perceives as) poverty, Ariadne runs off to Europe with Lubkov, a married man whose only claim to virtue seems to be his vivaciousness. Torn apart by his hopeless passion and the realization of how perious it could be, Shamohin nevertheless responds to her call and sheepishly joins the couple in Abbazia. Travelling with Ariadna and Lubkov through Southern Europe, he is appalled: the woman he loves is engaged in the life full of lies, where her one and only motivation is to be admired. Shocked by the realization that the woman he loves and the man he despises have been lovers all the way, Shamokhin rushes off and returns to his father's home. After the "unfaithful" Lubkov's departure, though, he is being summoned up by his "forsaken Ariadne". They become physically close and he continues the journey, squandering the money he receives from Russia, where his father by now had mortgaged his estate twice.

Later the narrator meets the couple in Yalta. It transpires that the only reason for Ariadna's decision to return to Russia was that prince Maktuyev was there. Shamokhin (who is now virtually broke) is rapturous: "Oh, Lord... If she hits it off with the prince, it means freedom, then I can go back to the country with my father!"

== Quotes ==
- "We are so intellectual, so solemn, that we utter nothing but truths and can discuss only questions of a lofty order. The Russian actor does not know how to be funny; he acts with profundity even in a farce. We're just the same: when we have got to talk of trifles we treat them only from an exalted point of view. It comes from a lack of boldness, sincerity, and simplicity." (Shamokhin of the Russians)
- "Often looking at her asleep, or eating, or trying to assume a naïve expression, I wondered why that extraordinary beauty, grace, and intelligence had been given her by God. Could it simply be for lolling in bed, eating and lying, lying endlessly?" (Shamokhin of Ariadne)
- "We men make a great stir about their emancipation, but they don't care about their emancipation at all, they only pretend to care about it; they are horribly cunning things, horribly cunning!" (Shamokhin of women)

== Reception ==
Elena Shavrova (Note: Elena Mikhaylovna Shavrova (Елена Михайловна Шаврова, 1874–1937) was a short story writer and Chekhov's regular correspondent since 1889, when they met in Yalta for the first time. He considered Shavrova a promising writer and edited some of her stories, but "being a woman of means, she never took her own talent seriously," according to Mikhail Chekhov. // Чехов М. П. Вокруг Чехова. С. 198–199) in her December 1895 letter suggested that "Ariadne" may well become a common name, "for it truly and realistically summarizes a true woman character" (la vraie femme aux hommes). Tatyana L. Tolstaya, Leo Tolstoy's daughter, wrote on 30 March 1899: "I am always amazed when I see a male writer who understand so deeply the woman's nature... I recognize myself in "Dushechka" so as to feel ashamed. But even more ashamed I felt when I recognized myself in Ariadna." The young Vsevolod Meyerkhold (writing to O.M. Munt in early 1896) called the story "ideologically to the point and wonderfully written". Ivan Bunin included Ariadna into his personal list of Chekhovs's best stories.

The contemporary conservative critics, while disagreeing about details, almost unanimously saw "Ariadna" as a step back in Chekhov's development as a writer. Y. Govorukha-Otrok in Moskovskiye Vedomosti compared Ariadna negatively to Turgenev's Torrents of Spring, saw it as superficial and panned as belonging to the Pyotr Boborykin territory of anecdotal prose. P.A. Achkasov in Russky Vestnik criticized Chekhov for his "diatribe against intelligent women" (mixing the author with his hero, Shamokhin), considering the story weak and unworthy of critical attention. Viktor Burenin disagreed, but (in his two reviews for Novoye Vreamya) accused Chekhov of having slipped into decadent mode and dismissed it as an ineffectual comment on "fashionable ideas of today", "all those graphomaniac Ariadnes and Chaykas who lie to themselves in their own writings". It was only after the 1903 edition of the Collected Works by Anton Chekhov came out that "Ariadna" started to gain positive reviews.
