= Peasants (novella) =

- Short story by Anton Chekhov
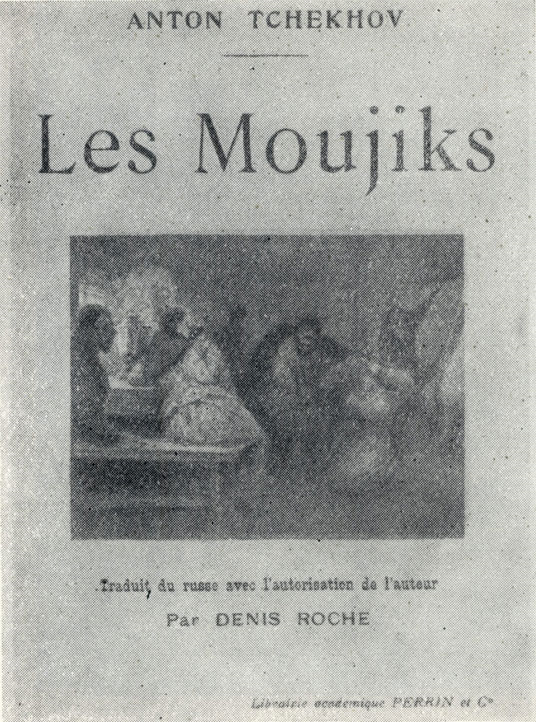
- Chekhov's 1899 French edition of Peasants
- Original title: Мужики
- Translator: Denis Rouche (French, 1899); Constance Garnett
- Language: Russian

Publication
- Published in: Russkaya Mysl (1897)
- Publisher: Adolf Marks (1901)
- Publication date: April 1897
- Publication place: Russia

"Peasants" (Russian: Мужики, romanized: Muzhiki) is an 1897 novella by Anton Chekhov. Upon its publication it became a literary sensation of the year, caused controversy (even the Chekhov admirer Leo Tolstoy labeled it "the crime against the people") but in retrospect is regarded as one of Chekhov's masterpieces.

== Publication ==
The novella was first published in the April 1897 issue of Russkaya Mysl. With minor changes and some additions to Chapter IX, it came out as a separate edition, first via Alexey Suvorin Publishing House, then (also the same year) as part of the book called Peasants and My Life. With further minor edits, Chekhov included it into volume 9 of his Collected Works published by Adolf Marks in 1899–1901.

== Background ==
The story's plotline was based upon Chekhov's five-year stay in Melikhovo. In a 2 April letter he informed his brother Alexander: "In the April 1897 issue of Russkaya Mysl the novella will appear where I describe the fire that broke out in Melikhovo when you visited the place in 1895." Chekhov was finishing the story at the time of the all-Russia census which he took an active part in the organization of in Melikhovo. It was in those days he steeped himself totally into the lives of the local peasantry.

The first mention of "Peasants" dates back to 1 January 1897 when Chekhov wrote to Elena Shavrova from Melikhovo: "I am busy, up to my throat: write and cross out, write and cross out again..." When he started working on the novella is uncertain, but it was completed by the end of February 1897. On 1 March he wrote to Alexey Suvorin: "How about this for a misfortune? Have written a story on the life of peasants, but they told me it won't pass censorship and has to be cut by half." The story was sent to Russkaya Mysl in mid-March; between 15th and 18th, according to Chekhov's two letters to Viktor Goltsev.

== Problems with censorship ==
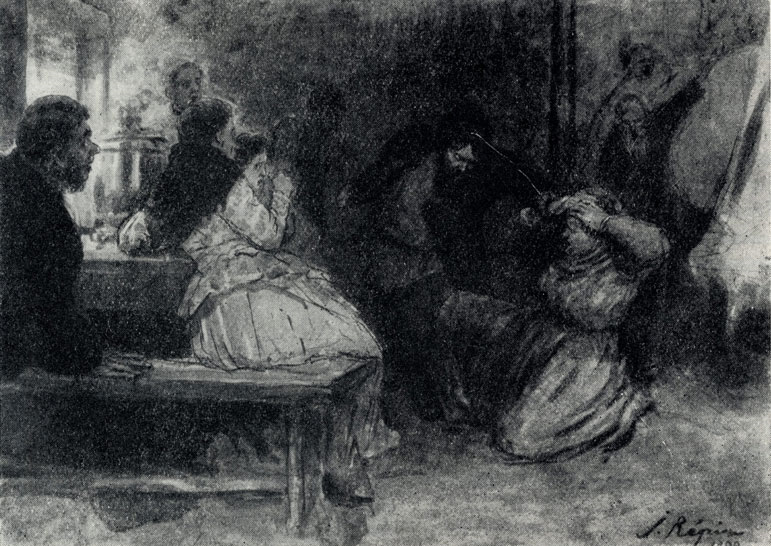
They heard a drunken cough, and a tall, black-bearded peasant wearing a winter cap came into the hut, and was the more terrible because his face could not be seen in the dim light of the little lamp. It was Kiryak. Going up to his wife, he swung his arm and punched her in the face with his fist. Stunned by the blow, she did not utter a sound, but sat down, and her nose instantly began bleeding. Ilya Repin's illustration for the 1899 French edition

On 2 April an issue of Russkaya Mysl, which had been already sent to press, was submitted to the censor V. Sokolov for a review. In his report he wrote: "In the first part of the April volume of Russkaya Mysl there is a story by A.P. Chekhov called "Peasants" which demands special attention. In it the life of peasants in villages is depicted in exceedingly grim tones. Throughout summer they toil in fields from morning till late at night along with members of their families, and yet are unable to store bread even for half a year. Nearly dying of hunger because of that, almost all of them, nevertheless, are engaged in excessive drinking. For this they are ready to part with everything, even their last piece of clothes... Their helplessness is aggravated by the immense burden of taxes which for peasants' families are unbearable. The real curse for these peasants, or rather their families, is indeed their total ignorance. The majority of the muzhiks, if the author is to be believed, do not believe in God and are deaf to religion. Peasants long for light and knowledge but are unable to find the way to them on their own because very few of them can read or write at all. Most of them are seemingly unaware of the concept of literacy as such."

The censor came to the conclusion that, according to the author, peasants were now much worse off than they had been as serfs, for in those times "...at least they had been fed, while now what the authorities only do is rob them and punish". The second report that Sokolov sent to the Moscow Censorship Committee drew the same conclusions, and as a result the whole page 123 (containing part of Chapter IX) was withdrawn from the April issue of Russkaya Mysl. The same year, though, Suvorin managed to publish the story as a separate edition with Chapter IX restored, even if in a slightly revised version.

Later, Chekhov's French translator Denis Rouche asked the author for the complete, uncensored version of the story. Chekov wrote in a 24 January letter to Fyodor Batyushkov: "Rouche asks me to send him those fragments that have been cut by censorship. But there have been no such cuts. There was one chapter which never made its way either into the magazine or into the book. But there is no need to send this chapter to Paris." The 'chapter' in question has never been identified. The story was published in French in September 1897 in the fortnightly Quinzaine. In 1901 it came out as a separate edition in Paris with illustrations by Ilya Repin. The latter presented the original drawings to Chekhov who on 10 April 1901 passed donated them to the Taganrog City Library.

== Synopsis ==
Nikolai Chikildiyev, once a Moscow restaurant waiter, now a very ill man, decides to leave the city and with his pious, meek wife Olga and daughter Sasha goes to Zhukovo, his native village. They are shocked by the horrible state of the place, but have to settle into this murky and dangerous world of poverty, filth, ignorance, spitefulness and drunk violence. Things go from bad to worse, as at one point the fire destroys a house in the village (with locals watching helplessly and a guesting student taking upon himself the role of a lone firefighter), at another the police inspector comes to collect the arrears from the villagers and confiscate a samovar from the Chikildiyev's house. Finally, Nikolai dies (or rather gets killed by medical incompetence), and mother and daughter, almost happy now to leave all those horrors behind, set off to Moscow, begging for money on their way.

== Reception ==
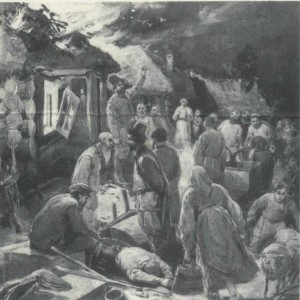
The peasants stood round in a crowd, doing nothing but staring at the fire. No one knew what to do, no one had the sense to do anything, though there were stacks of wheat, hay, barns, and piles of faggots standing all round. Kiryak and old Osip, his father, both tipsy, were standing there, too. And as though to justify his doing nothing, old Osip said, addressing the woman who lay on the ground: "What is there to trouble about, old girl! The hut is insured—why are you taking on?" 1903 Illustration by Alexander Apsit

Russian literary historians regard Peasants, with its vast and brutally realistic panorama of the life of low-class Russian rural community, as a revelatory event in the Russian literature of the 1890s. "Just finished your peasants. What a delight! Read it late in the evening in one gulp and couldn't fall asleep after it for a long time," Nikolai Leykin wrote in a 29 April 1897 letter. Actor and dramatist Alexander Yuzhin wrote in May 1897: "Your Peasants is the greatest piece of literature in the whole world in many years, at least as us Russians are concerned... Not a single false, maudlin note; everything is tragic truth, [drawn] with the overpowering strength of natural, Shakespearian palette, as if you were not a writer, but the Nature itself." In a May 1897 letter Vladimir Nemirovich-Danchenko wrote: "I've read Peasants with enormous mental tension... Judging by the reaction from here and there you haven't had such a success for a very long time."

The praise, though, was far from unanimous. Leo Tolstoy, who felt great affection for Chekhov the writer, felt deeply offended. Viktor Mirolyubov in his 1900 diaries quoted Tolstoy as saying: "His Peasants is a sin against the people, he doesn't know the Russian man." In 1898 Chekhov became a member of the Union of Support for the Russian Writers, but all but failed to pass the voting stage because of the hostile reaction to Peasants, according to Alexey Suvorin who left a note on this accident in his April 1898 diary. Sharply negative reviews came from Novosti i Birzhevaya Gazeta (1897, No. 118, 1 May, by Skriba), Sankt-Peterburgskiye Vedomosti (1897, No.114, 29 April, N. Ladozhsky) and Moskovskiye Vedomsti (1897, No.114, 29 April, K. Medvedsky).

Still, the story became the major literary event of the late 1890s. "It's hard to remember a work of fiction that would enjoy such astounding and well-deserved success as Chekhov's Peasants. Looking for comparisons, we would have to go back to the times when a new novel by Tolstoy or Dostoyevsky would come out," wrote (the anonymous) Severny Vestnik reviewer in the No.6, 1897 issue.

The major magazines and newspapers published reviews on it, although, according to biographer Rodionova, most of them were superficial and focused mainly on retelling the plot. One notable example was an insightful essay by the Nedelya critic Mikhail Menshikov in the May, No.5, 1897 issue of Knizhki Nedeli (Books of the Week). "Chekhov's story is the immense step ahead in the science of the people, arguably, the most important of all sciences. In it lies the social significance of this artful piece," the author argued. Positive reviews came also from Ignaty Potapenko (as Fingal) in Novoye Vremya, Angel Bogdanovich in Mir Bozhy, and Ieronim Yasinsky in Birzhevyie Vedomosti.

The novella inspired a heated discussion between Pyotr Struve, writing for Novoye Vremya, and Nikolai Mikhaylovsky (Russkoye Bogatstvo). Struve praised it for what he saw as "the condemnation of the pathetic moralizing of narodniks". Mikhaylovsky criticized Chekhov for giving too much attention to details and caring little for "clear ideological standpoints".
