= The House with the Mezzanine =

1896 short story by Anton Chekhov

- Short story by Anton Chekhov
- 1954 illustration by Kukryniksy
- Original title: Дом с мезонином
- Country: Russia
- Language: Russian

Publication
- Published in: Russkaya Mysl (1896)
- Publisher: Adolf Marks (1901)
- Publication date: April 1896

"The House with the Mezzanine" (Russian: Дом с мезонином, romanized: Dom s mezoninom) is an 1896 short story by Anton Chekhov, subtitled (and also translated as) "An Artist's Story" (Рассказ художника, Rasskaz khudozhnika).

== Publication ==
The story was first published in the April 1896 issue of Russkaya Mysl, with the subtitle 'An Artist's Story' (Рассказ художника). With minor changes it was included by Chekhov into Volume 9 of his Collected Works published by Adolf Marks in 1899–1901. During Chekhov's lifetime the story was translated into Bulgarian, Hungarian, German, Serbo-Croatian and Czech languages.

== Background ==
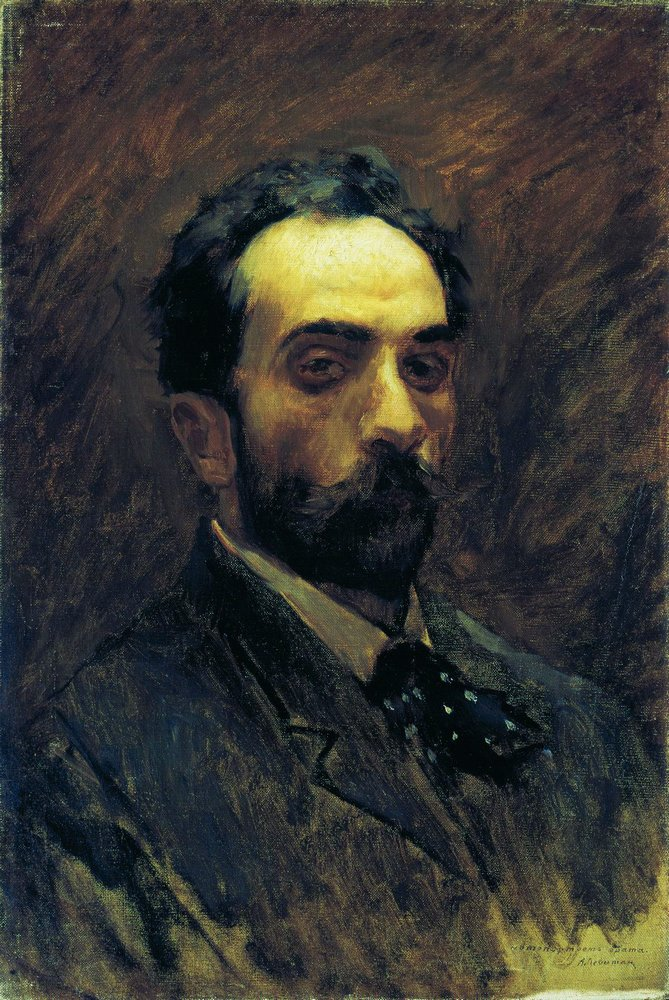
Isaak Levitan was the possible prototype for the Artist, although the views the latter expressed in the story belonged to the author himself, according to Vukol Lavrov

The first mention of the story dates back to 26 November 1895 when Chekhov, writing from Melikhovo, informed his correspondent Elena Shavrova: "I am writing now a small story called 'My Bride'." [Моя невеста, Moya nevesta]." He went on: "Once I had a bride... That is what they'd called her: Missyuss. (Note: Missyuss was a nickname given to Zhenya, because "as a child she used to call her English governess that.") My love for her was strong. That is what I am writing about." Whom did he mean exactly, remained unclear.

The domestic circumstances were apparently not suitable for writing and the work proceeded in fits and starts. "Still cannot finish a small novella I am now engaged with: guests interfere. Starting with 23 December crowds of people are there in my house, I crave for solitude, but as soon as I find myself on my own, I feel nothing but resentment and disgust, remembering how the day had been thrown away. Eating and chatting, eating and chatting all day long," he complained in a 29 December letter to Alexey Suvorin. According to Chekhov's 17 March letter to Viktor Goltsev, the story had been completed in early March.

Half a year prior to that, in the summer of 1895, Chekhov guested at Vukol Lavrov's in Maleyevka. His major points of interest in the discussions that he had with the host, as the latter remembered, was the life of peasantry in Russia. "Chekhov expressed his views upon this matter in the monologues of the landscape painter in this story," Lavrov later maintained.

According to Anton Chekhov's brother Mikhail, the story's location was the village Bogimovo in Kaluga Governorate where Chekhov had spent the summer of 1891. Mikhail Chekhov also names the prototypes for the landlord Belokurov and his partner Lyubov Ivanovna as E.D. Bylim-Kolosovsky and his wife Anemaisa.

Sofia Prorokova, the author of Isaak Levitan's biography, suggested that the house with a terrace and a mezzanine in question might have been the one belonging to Anna N. Turchaninova, whose Gorka estate in the Tver Governorate Chekhov visited in the summer of 1895. According to Prorokova, the story might have been based upon the difficult relationship Levitan had with the Turchaninova sisters (hence the similarity in surnames), of whom the younger one, Varvara, the possible prototype for Zhenya (Missyuss), had a bizarre diminutive nickname, Lyulyu. This view was shared by the literary historian Leonid Grossman.

== Plot ==
Lydia Volchaninova, a good-looking, but very stern and opinionated young teacher with somewhat dictatorial inclinations is deeply engaged in the affairs of the local zemstvo. Devoted to the cause of helping peasants, she is interested in doing and speaking of nothing but practical work, mostly in the fields of medicine and education. Lydia dislikes the protagonist, a landscape painter, who frequently visits their house. From time to time the two clash over problems of both the rural community and Russia as a whole.

The painter discovers a kindred spirit in Lydia's younger sister Zhenya, a dreamy and sensitive girl who spends her time reading, admiring him painting and having long walks. The two fall in love, and an evening comes when, after a walk, the painter lets his feelings out in a passionate outburst. Zhenya responds in kind, but feels she has to tell her mother and sister about their love immediately.

The following day he learns that Zhenya and her mother had departed. A boy hands him a note from Znenya, which reads: "I have told my sister everything and she insists on my parting from you. I could not hurt her by disobeying. God will give you happiness. If you knew how bitterly mamma and I have cried." The painter leaves the place too. The last glimpse of hope to fill his lonely life with any kind of meaning is now gone, and the person who robbed him of it was Lydia, the one who cared for nothing but bettering other people's lives. Time passes, but he cannot forget Zhenya and deep in his heart knows she still thinks of him, too.

=== Quotes ===
- "In my opinion medical stations, schools, libraries, pharmacies, under existing conditions, only lead to slavery. The masses are caught in a vast chain : you do not cut it but only add new links to it ... You come to their assistance with hospitals and schools, but you do not free them from their fetters; on the contrary, you enslave them even more, since by introducing new prejudices into their lives, you increase the number of their demands." (Painter)
- " People generally talk like that... when they want to excuse their indifference. It is easier to deny hospitals and schools than to come and teach... We shall never agree, since I value the most imperfect library or pharmacy, of which you spoke so scornfully just now, more than all the landscapes in the world." (Lydia)

== Reception ==
The story which in retrospect is seen as a Chekhov classic, in its time divided critical opinion. The writer Alexandra Andreyeva was one of the few who admired it. In her 24 April 1896 letter to Chekhov she wrote: "I read your new story the other day. There's such a wealth of poetic charm in it... that I felt compelled to write and thank you for the delight that you'd given me. I know that many female readers feel cross with you because of 'Lydia', [the character which makes them infer] you feel indifferent to all the good work they do to the people. Still I think the majority should dig deeper and develop a clearer understanding of both the fruitful idleness of an artist and the socially important work of a teacher."

In general, the contemporary critical response was negative, reviewers preferred to totally ignore the story's social undercurrents. The critic Scriba, writing for Novosti i Birzhevaya Gazeta, suggested that the story should be taken for a sign that "the time has come to stop worshipping Chekhov's name". Some reviewers, notably M. Poltavsky (in Birzhevye Vedomosti, 25 April 1896) and Alexander Skabichevsky (Novoye Slovo, January 1897), seemed to have resented the author's assumed sympathy with the 'thinking' artist's social apathy as opposed to the eagerness of Lydia, a proponent of the 'theory of small deeds' which was then popular with Russian intelligentsia.

Quite similar were the reviews by Russkiye Vedomosti (by Ilya Ignatov) and Vostochnoye Obozreniye (F. Kohn), both concentrating on picking on flaws in the central character's mindset.
