= In the Cart =

- Short story by Anton Chekhov
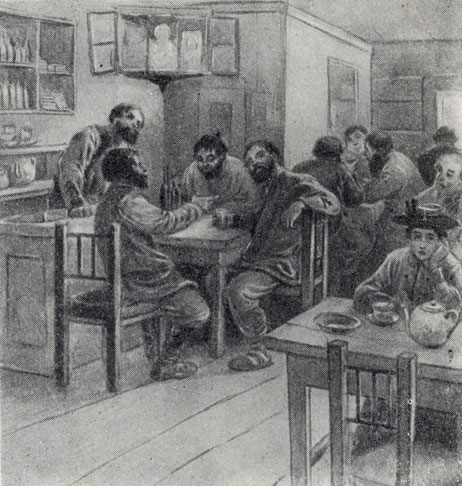
- 1903 illustration by Alexander Apsit
- Original title: На подводе
- Translator: Constance Garnett
- Country: Russia
- Language: Russian

Publication
- Published in: Russkiye Vedomosti (1897)
- Publisher: Adolf Marks (1901)
- Publication date: December 1897

"In the Cart" (Russian: На подводе, romanized: Na podvode) is an 1897 short story by Anton Chekhov, also translated as "The Schoolmistress".

== Publication ==
The story, written in Nice, France, in November 1897, was first published in the No. 352, 21 December 1897 issue of the Russkiye Vedomosti. Vasily Sobolevsky, the newspaper's editor-in-chief, asked the author to remove the bit in which Nikolay Alekseyev, the mayor of Moscow, assassinated in 1893 was mentioned. (Note: The 16 March 1893 Interior Ministry order prescribed the Russian press to abstain from publishing anything concerning the murder; the assassin, Adrianov was later declared to be 'insane'.) Chekhov complied, but later restored it.

In a slightly revised version "In the Cart" was published in the 1898 (second) edition of a charitable compilation called Brotherly Help for the Armenians Who Suffered in Turkey (Братская помощь пострадавшим в Турции армянам). With still more minor cuts, Chekhov included it into Volume 9 of his Collected Works published by Adolf Marks in 1899–1901.

== Background ==
V.N. Ladyzhensky (Note: Vladimir Nikolayevich Ladyzhensky (Владимир Николаевич Ладыженский, 1859-1932) was a minor Russian poet, writer and journalist, an authority on zemstvo. After 1917 he lived in France and worked mostly as a teacher. He first met Chekhov in 1890 and occasionally corresponded with him. There are 9 Ladyzhensky letters to Chekhov in the Russian Chekhov Archives, and 3 replies by Chekhov.) in his memoirs remembered how in Melikhovo he had a conversation with Chekhov on the dire conditions which teachers had to live in, in rural Russia. "...Later I recognized some of [what's been said] in the harsh realism of this short story, In the Cart," he wrote in Mir Bozhiy (April 1905).

== Plot ==
Maria Vasilyevna, a schoolmistress, returns to her village from the town where she'd been collecting her meager salary (21 rubles, although local folks consider her grossly overpaid: "5 rubles would be more than enough"). The road is as muddy, difficult and seemingly endless as her 13 years in this horrible place have been. At one point, while crossing the river, the cart all but overturns, and she gets knee-deep in icy water. At another she stops for tea in a local tavern full of drunken louts, some of them outright abusive.

She meets the local landlord Khanov, once good-looking, but now a miserable, dreary man and, apparently, already an alcoholic. She imagines him to be a kindred spirit, but could they ever become partners? No, she has to admit: this horrible life has killed in her all attractiveness, almost stripped her of femininity. In a haze, she tries to remember details of her earlier life, but almost all of it has been erased by the years of hard, thankless and, in the end, meaningless labour. At a railway barrier, watching the train passing by, she sees in it a woman who looks very much like her late mother.

She bursts into tears, then Khanov again drives up, and suddenly, seeing him she imagines "...happiness such as she had never had". She smiles to him as an equal and a friend, and it seems to her that "...her happiness, her triumph, [is] glowing in the sky and on all sides, in the windows and on the trees. Her father and mother had never died, she had never been a schoolmistress, it was a long, tedious, strange dream, and now she had awakened..." He invites her up into his cart in a nonchalant, almost dismissive way, and... the vision disappears. Again she is alone in the world of hopelessness.

== Reception ==
Among the people who thanked Chekhov for the story in their letters was his sister Maria. Ignaty Potapenko in his December 1897 letter expressed his 'delight' too. S. Ashevsky in his essay "Our Teachers in Chekhov's Stories" (Obrazovaniye, April 1904) used the character of Maria Vasilyevna in his description of the dire state of the Imperial Russian's 'people's pedagogy'. "It's hard to find in the whole Russian literature the truer testament for the joyless existence of Russian teachers in the rural province, than this short story, complementing perfectly 'A Dreary Story' and 'The Man in the Case'," he argued.

Leo Tolstoy on 21 December 1897 (the day of its publication) left a short note on the story in his diary: "In terms of artfulness, superb, but he becomes didactic when trying to give meaning to it".
