= Anna on the Neck =

- Short story by Anton Chekhov
- 1954 illustration by Kukryniksy
- Original title: Анна на шее
- Country: Russia
- Language: Russian

Publication
- Published in: Russkiye Vedomosti (1895)
- Publisher: Adolf Marks (1901)
- Publication date: 22 October 1895

"Anna on the Neck" (Russian: Анна на шее, romanized: Anna na sheye) is an 1895 short story by Anton Chekhov.

== Publication ==
Chekhov sent the story to Vasily Sobolevsky, the Russkiye Vedomosti's editor, on 15 October 1895. It was published in the No. 292, 22 October 1895 issue of the newspaper.

In a re-worked version (now divided into two chapters and with numerous details added, with the view of making the heroine's character more distinct) it was included into Volume 9 of the Collected Works by A.P. Chekhov published by Adolf Marks in 1899–1901. In its final version, the story's last section was told entirely from the point of view of its heroine, who became more sanguine, self-satisfied and distanced from her family. Numerous satirical details were added to the Modest Alexeyevich's character.

== Summary ==
In his Notebook I (page 47) Chekhov summarised the plot for "Anna on the Neck", then yet to be written: "A poor girl, gymnasium student, with five brothers, marries a rich state official who counts every single piece of bread, demands from her subserviance and gratitude, is scornful of her relatives... She endures all this, trying not to argue with him, so as not to fall back into destitude again. Then the invitation to the ball comes. Here she causes furore. An important person gets infatuated with her, makes her his lover... Now, seeing how her husband's chiefs fawn before her, at home she's full of disdain: 'Go away you fool!' " The actual story's plot is similar.

The story's title is a double-entendre, having to do with the Order of Saint Anna and the methods of its wear. Anna's husband Modest Alexeyich has just received the 2nd class OSA, a cross which was supposed to be worn on the neck.

== Reception ==
In his October 1895 review, the writer and critic Yuri Govorukha-Otrok juxtaposed Chekhov's story with some similar plots by Alexander Ostrovsky, concluding that where the latter seeks for drama and tragedy, the former is quite content with the comical approach, which he'd developed in his early works.

In 1904 the critic Yuri Dyagilev (writing under the pseudonym Yu. Chereda), analyzed "Anna on the Neck" and "The House with the Mezzanine" along the lines of his own conception according to which Chekhov and Dostoyevsky were the masters of paeans to the 'philistine's happiness'.

== Adaptations ==
- A 1954 film, The Anna Cross, was directed by Isidor Annensky.
