= Protopopov =

Protopopov is the surname of several Russian individuals.

- Alexander Protopopov (1866–1918), Russian Minister of Interior 1916–17
- Mikhail Protopopov (1848–1915), Russian journalist and literary critic
- Mikhail Aleeksevich Protopopov (born 1944), Archpriest and Chancellor of the ROCOR Diocese of Sydney, Australia and New Zealand
- Oleg Protopopov (1932–2023), Russian figure skater
  - The skating duo of Oleg and his wife Ludmila Belousova (1935–2017) are known as The Protopopovs
- Sergei Protopopov (1893–1954), Russian composer and music theorist
- Vasiliy Yakovlevich Protopopov (1846–1914), mayor of Odessa
- Victor Protopopov (1880–1957), Russian psychiatrist
- Yakiv Protopopov, member of the Combined Bandurist Capella
