= Vladimir Lesevich =

Ukrainian-Russian philosopher (1837–1905)

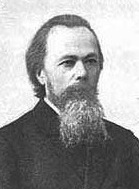
- Born: 27 January 1837; Poltava Governorate, Russian Empire
- Died: 26 November 1905 (aged 68); Kyiv, Russian Empire

Philosophical work
- Era: 19th-century philosophy
- Region: Russian philosophy
- School: Positivism; Empirio-criticism
- Institutions: Shevchenko Scientific Society
- Main interests: philosophy of science, philosophy of religion

Vladimir Viktorovich Lesevich (Ukrainian: Володимир Вікторович Лесевич, Russian: Владимир Викторович Лесевич; 27 January [O.S. 15 January] 1837 – 26 November 1905) was a Ukrainian-Russian philosopher and sociologist of the positivist and later Empirio-Criticist school as well as an ethnographer, folklorist, literary historian and public figure.

== Biography ==
Vladimir Viktorovich came from the Ukrainian Cossack noble family of Lesevich. Being orphaned from a young age, he was raised by his grandparents. After graduating from Kyiv Gymnasium he studied engineering at the Engineering Academy in Saint Petersburg until 1856. Between 1856 and 1859 he served as an officer in the Russian Army in an engineer battalion in the Caucasus, where he took part in combat operations in the Caucasusian War. He graduated from the General Staff Academy of the Russian Army in Saint Petersburg in 1861, but retired the following year and founded a school for Ukrainian farmers in his home village in 1864, with Ukrainian as the language of instruction. Because of this, the school administration closed the school again, which was widely publicized by the media at the time, both within the Russian Empire and internationally.

Throughout the 1860s he collaborated in the journals Otechestvennye zapiski and Vestnik Evropy. In the 1870s he belonged to the circles of the St. Petersburg intelligentsia “Society of Sober Philosophers” and “Olkhinsky Club”. In 1875 he established the “Literary Fund named after T. Shevchenko" and the "Ukrainian Publishing Society", in which he intended to publish books in the Ukrainian language, which was prohibited according to the Ems Ukaz. At the end of the decade he traveled to Germany and Great Britain, where he met the Russian philosopher Alexander Herzen in London.

On suspicion of having connections with the Narodniks, he was arrested in 1879 and exiled first to Siberia, then to Kazan and, in 1881, to the Caucasus. In 1882 he lived under police supervision in Poltava and in 1885 and 1888 in Tver. In the same year he returned to Saint Petersburg, where he joined the circle of Nikolai Mikhailovsky. He actively collaborated in the magazine Russkoye Bogatstvo and later the magazine Russian Mind. He lectured at the Higher Russian School of Public Sciences and organized the Society for the Study of Ethnography and History of Ukraine in St. Petersburg.

Being an active supporter of national self-determination of Ukraine, Lesevich financially supported Mykhailo Drahomanov and the publishing houses of the Galician radicals of the Ukrainian Radical Party, and was friends with figures such as Ivan Franko and Mykhailo Hrushevsky. In 1901 he was expelled from St. Petersburg and went abroad; in 1902 he was in Italy and in 1903, in France, where he participated in the International Sociological Congress in Paris.

Vladimir Lesevich died in Kyiv on November 26, 1905. He was buried in Kyiv at the Askold's Grave cemetery. According to his will, his library was transferred to the Shevchenko Scientific Society.

== Philosophical views ==
In his early works, Lesevich was an orthodox follower of positivists, primarily Auguste Comte and Pyotr Lavrov, as well as the materialist humanism of Ludwig Feuerbach. He wrote against the “remnants” of theology and metaphysics and believed that the victory of “positive” and “scientific” stage of the development of thought was an inevitability.

Beginning to take interest in epistemological issues, the second stage is characterized by the desire to supplement Comte’s positivism with a critical principle. The latter meant the actualization of the ideas of neo-Kantian criticism of Alois Riehl, the subjective idealism of George Berkeley and David Hume, and the development of a theory of knowledge based on empirio-criticism of Richard Avenarius.
