= Nikolai Wagner =

Russian zoologist (1829–1907)

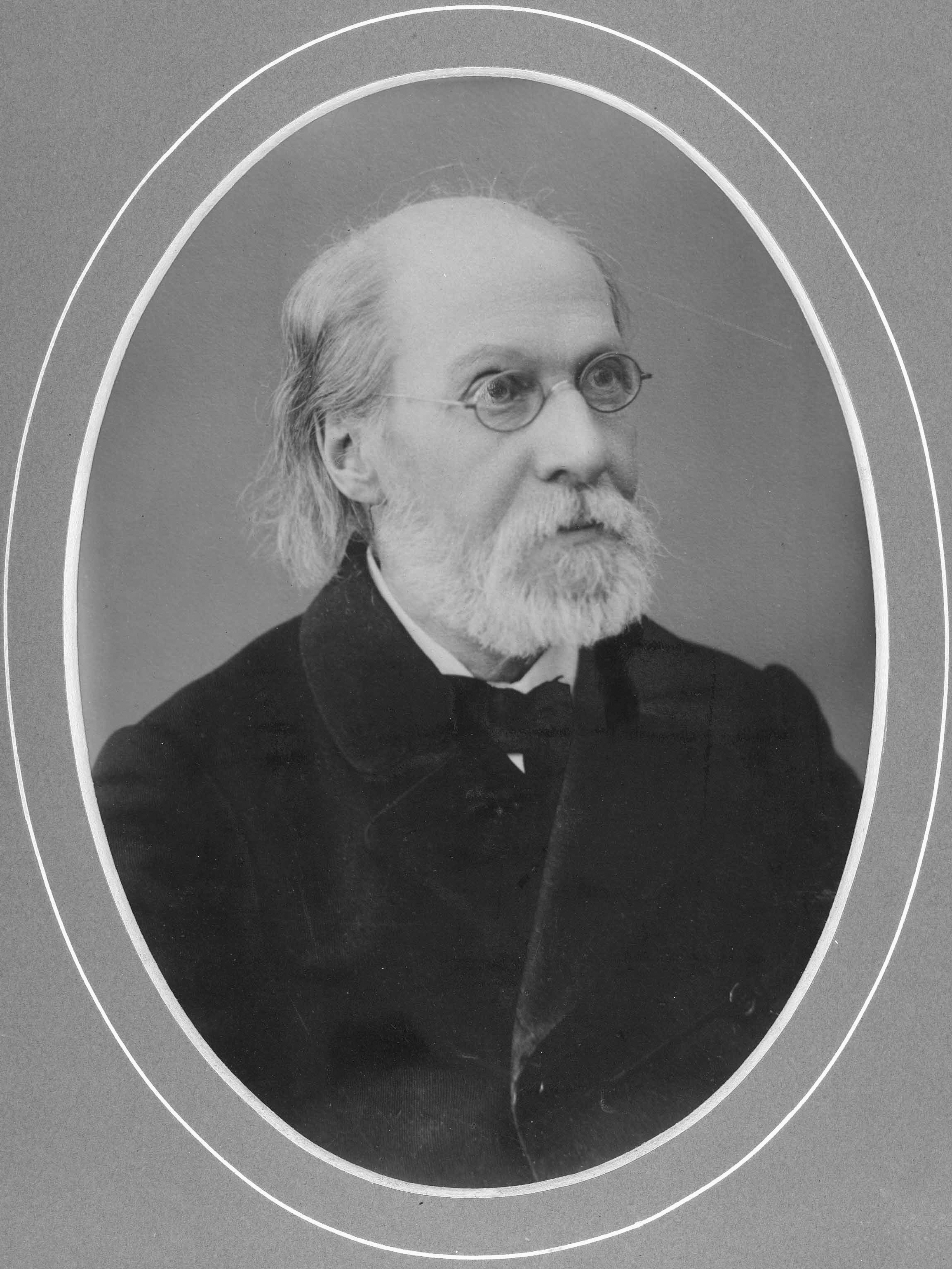
- Born: Николай Петрович Вагнер; 30 July 1829; Bogoslovsky Zavod, Verkhotursky Uyezd, Perm Governorate, Russian Empire
- Died: 3 April 1907 (aged 77); Saint Petersburg, Russian Empire
- Occupations: zoologist, writer

Nikolai Petrovich Wagner (Russian: Николай Петрович Вагнер; 30 July 1829, – 3 April 1907) was a Russian zoologist, editor, essayist and writer.

== Biography ==
Nikolai Wagner was born at the Bogoslovsky Zavod in Perm Governorate (now Karpinsk, Sverdlovsk Oblast) to a noble family. His father Pyotr Petrovich Wagner (1899–1876), originally a doctor in the Urals, later lectured as a professor of geology, mineralogy and anatomy at the Kazan University.

Nikolai Wagner attended the private M.N. Lvov boarding school, then the 2nd Kazan Gymnasium which he graduated from in 1845 to enroll in Kazan University's faculty of natural sciences. While still a student, in 1848, he debuted as a published author with two articles on beetles in Russkaya Illyustratsia. In 1852 he started lecturing at the Kazan University, which he became the professor of zoology of in 1860 and later edited the university's magazine.

In 1863 Wagner was awarded that year's Demidov Prize for his treatise "Spontaneous Reproduction among the Larvae of Insects" (Самопроизвольное размножение у гусениц насекомых). His discovery of paedogenesis with gall gnats initially was met with disbelief at home and abroad, but soon won him universal acclaim in the scientific world. In 1869 he won the Bordin Prize from the French Academy of Sciences and was elected the Honourable member of the Siberian University. Up until 1894 Wagner lectured at Saint Petersburg University, in 1870–1885 as a professor. He founded the biological station at the Solovetsky Islands on the White Sea and remained its director up until his death.

In 1877—1879 Wagner edited the popular science magazine Svet (The Light). In 1891 he was elected the president of the Russian Society of Experimental Psychology, in 1899 – the Honourable member of Kazan University. His book of essays on popular zoology Pictures from the Lives of Animals (Картины из жизни животных) came out in 1901.

=== Spiritualism ===
Wagner, a Slavophile (through the influence of Sergey and Konstantin Aksakovs), remained an atheist and a Darwinist up until 1874 when he started to attend the spiritualist séances. Along with professor Alexander Butlerov and Aksakov he organised a series of scientifically based examinations of the phenomenon. In the course of his psychic research while having come across numerous frauds, he still came to the conclusion that the phenomenon was genuine. He became a staunch Spiritualist and got himself involved in heated correspondence defending his views, polemicizing with Dmitry Mendeleyev and criticising Leo Tolstoy for having ridiculed what he had little information about in The Fruits of Enlightenment, a broad swipe at Spiritualism. His spiritualistic beliefs have put an end to his friendship with Fyodor Dostoyevsky.

=== Literary career ===
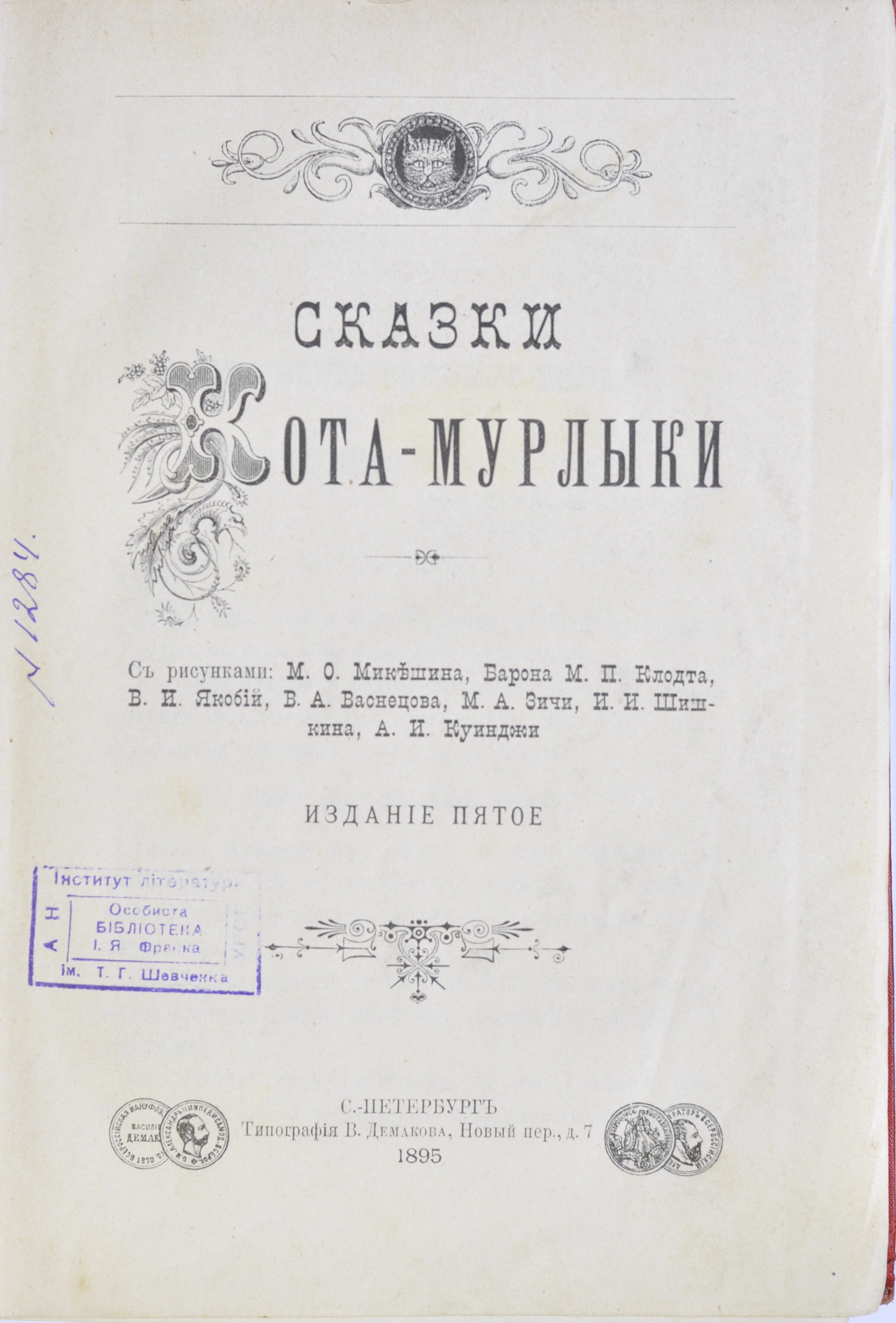
Cat Murlyka's title page. 1895

As a fiction writer Wagner made his mark as an author of popular books for children, the most successful of which, Skazki kota Murlyki (Cat Purr's Fairytales), a collection of twenty five finely written mystical and philosophical fables and stories, came out in 1872. Wagner's fairytales, a peculiar mix of hazy mysticism and harsh realism centered around the theme of good against evil, elicited lively debate in the pedagogical spheres in Russia, the majority of critics agreeing that they had nothing to do with children's literature whatsoever. The fact that Skazki have been re-issued a dozen of times in the pre-1917 Russia (since 1918 Wagner's work stopped being published altogether) attests for their popularity, although apparently mostly with the adult readership.

K svetu (To the Light), his early 'serious' novel (written originally in 1869) was published by Russkaya Mysl in 1883 to little response. It was followed in 1890 by his highly controversial and much discussed epic Tyomny put (Тёмный путь, Dark Path). Driven by the notion of there being widespread Jewish conspiracy for the world domination and, more worryingly, the destruction of Russia, it led to Wagner's being accused of obscurantism and antisemitism. Even the right-wing reviewers, though, who might have hailed it for the subject matter itself, responded mutely, having found it, apparently, of little artistic merit. In retrospect more sympathetic literary historians found in the novel as well in some other later works by Wagner elements of prescience; the latter had to do, though, not with conspiracy theories, but rather with science, psychology and parapsychology, some precipitating Freudian ideas.

Up until now the critics are divided about Wagner's literary legacy. The biographer Viktor Shirokov hails him as "Our Russian Andersen", Savely Dudakov called his essay on Wagner Evil Fairy-teller, while A. Goryashko combined both attitudes in a biography called The Bad Good Man Some of the critics (Dudakov among them) tended to explain the uneasy fact that the author, who became quite famous for his humanistic fables, preaching universal love and kindness, later in his life all of a sudden shifted dramatically to the right, owning up to the ideas that several years later would lead to pogroms, in terms of Wagner's progressing mental illness.

Nikolai Wagner died in 1907 of paralytic dementia. He is interred in the Smolensky Cemetery in Saint Petersburg.
