= Irina Ilovaiskaya =

Yugoslavian journalist and activist

Irina Alekseevna Ilovaiskaya-Alberti (Russian: Ирина Алексеевна Иловайская-Альберти) (born 5 December 1924, Belgrade, Kingdom of Serbia – died 4 April 2000, Königstein im Taunus, Germany) was a journalist of Russian descent and campaigner against communism who edited La Pensée Russe, a Russian-language weekly newspaper published in Paris. She was born into a family who had left Russia for Serbia during the revolution. As a student at a Russian religious school under Metropolitan Anastasius, she spent years studying religion and maintaining the altar. Ilovaiskaya-Alberti's spiritual father in those years was the prominent Orthodox theologian priest Georgy Florovsky. With his blessing, she married the Italian diplomat Edgardo Georgie Alberti. She moved back to Russia in 1991.

== Biography ==
For several years, she and her husband participated in broadcasts on "Radio Freedom" and she also became a close associate of Alexandr Solzhenitsyn. She developed close friendships with a number of leading intellectuals and religious figures, including Academician Andrei Sakharov, Alain Besançon, Pope John Paul II, Malcolm Pearson, Baroness Caroline (Caroline) Cox, Vladimir Pribylovsky, Georgy Chistyakov and Natalia Solzhenitsyn. During the last twenty years of her life, Ilovaiskaya-Alberti was Chief Editor of the newspaper "Russian Thought". Prior to the fall of the Soviet Union, Russian Thought garnered a broad readership throughout the world and especially in Russia. It dealt with world events and Russian life, particularly focusing on political, social, religious and cultural aspects. The newspaper gained a following among a number of the world's leading politicians, sociologists, religious leaders, and social scientists.

It was in articles in Russian Thought that Ilovaiskaya-Alberti coined the phrase "new Russian", ascribing to it the phrase's current meaning. The phrase was created as a play on nouveau riche - nuvoryus (fr. Nouveau riche - "new rich", Nouveau Russe - "new Russian").

One of Ilovaiskaya-Alberti's goals in the latter years of her life was to increase the readership of the Russian Thought newspaper in Russia itself. In June 1999, at the first International Congress of the Russian Press, Russian Thought was given by the President of Russia an award for principled reporting.

Ilovaiskaya-Alberti founded the "Radio Blagovest" and "Christian Church and Social Channel"-"Radio Sofia" radio programs, which she used to conduct daily broadcasts. She viewed her primary goal as the assessment of world events in the light of the Christian faith. She was Orthodox by baptism and upbringing, but more later converted herself to Catholicism and receive a Catholic funeral.

Ilovaiskaya-Alberti was also Vice President of the World Association of Russian Press (1999). She was buried in Bevagna (200 km from Rome), in the town cemetery, next to her husband and her son.
