= The Teacher of Literature =

- Short story by Anton Chekhov
- 1954 illustration by T. Shishmaryova
- Original title: Учитель словесности
- Country: Russia
- Language: Russian

Publication
- Published in: Novoye Vremya (1889, I); Russkiye Vedomosti (1894, II)
- Publisher: Adolf Marks (1901)

"The Teacher of Literature" or "The Russian Master" (Russian: Учитель словесности, romanized: Uchitel slovesnosti) is an 1894 short story by Anton Chekhov.

== Publication ==
The first chapter of the story, titled "The Philistines" (Обыватели) was published in the 28 November (old style) 1889, No. 4940 issue of Novoye Vremya, with the dedication to doctor N.N. Obolensky who at the time was providing treatment to Chekhov's brother Nikolai. The second chapter, "The Teacher of Literature", appeared five years later, in the 10 July 1894, No. 188 issue of the newspaper Russkiye Vedomosti. With some minor edits, both chapters, under the title "The Teacher of Literature" (and without a dedication) were included into the 1894 collection Novellas and Stories (Повести и рассказы). Chekhov made several more minor edits before including it into Volume 8 of his Collected Works published by Adolf Marks in 1899-1901.

== Background ==
According to the critic Yuri Sobolev, who cites the Taganrog history scholar Pavel Filevsky as a source, the prototype for Nikitin might have been the teacher of Latin in the Taganrog City Gymnasium V.D. Starov, although Chekhov has, apparently 'softened' some aspects of the latter's tragic story.

Chapter I was written in early November 1889. "Your staff member An. Chekhov has just started to bring to life another of your 'subbotniks'. The start is promising," the author informed Alexey Suvorin on 1 November. In a 12 November letter he wrote: "I send you a story for your feuilleton [section]. A not very serious piece, examining the lives of little provincial creatures... Initially I planned to destroy the main characters, but then was careless enough to read it to some of my [friends] and they all cried out: please have mercy on them! I did, and that is why the story turned out so sour."

== Synopsis ==
Nikitin, a 27-year-old teacher of Russian literature in a provincial gymnasium, is infatuated with Masha Shelestova, an 18-year daughter of a local landlord. A happy man, he admires everything about the Shelestov house and is even prepared to endure the huge number of cats and dogs. He marries Masha and the idyll continues, now partly in their country house.

One evening, Nikitin returns home from the club where he had been playing cards. He'd lost 12 rubles, but what seems to have upset him much more were the words of one man who noted that now that he's married a rich man's daughter, he'd have "pots of money". A strange feeling creeps upon Nikitin. He starts to realise that he's gotten himself into a trap and is stuck now forever in a mire where everything and everyone is untrue and shallow. It dawns upon Nikitin that he rather dislikes both the school and all the people around him. Recognizing now that his wife is a silly, vulgar creature, he sees that "...the illusion had evaporated, and that a new life of unrest and clear sight" is beginning which is "incompatible with peace and personal happiness". "I must escape from here, I must escape today, or I shall go out of my mind!" he writes in his diary, and with these words the story ends.

== Reception ==
External videos
- Учитель словесности. (45 min); The 1965 Soviet TV adaptation with Nikolai Penkov as Nikitin, Ksenya Minina as Masha Shelestova, Alexey Gribov as her father and Raisa Maksimova as her sister Varya.

The first chapter of the story (called "The Philistines" and published in 1889) received warm reviews. Among Chekhov's correspondents who expressed their delight with the 'freshness' of the picture of trivial, but in a way very endearing family happiness, were Ivan Leontyev and Alexey Pleshcheyev, who in a 29 November 1889 letter to Chekhov wrote: "What a lovely snapshot of the common people's life! Its beauty is in the details, in small sketches, 'glimpses', as painters say. All of them are the true faces of the people I've met, saw or knew." Sergey Andreyevsky in his Novoye Vremya January 1895 review praised the story "filled to the brim with the naive poeticism of the provincial romantic delights" but preferred not to concentrate on its dark, foreboding final section.

The story was lauded by, among others, by Leo Tolstoy and Pyotr Tchaikovsky who (according to the 17 August 1903 letter by the latter's brother Modest) declared "The Teacher of Literature" to be one of Chekhov's gems.

The majority of the contemporary reviewers (quite unlike Andreyevsky) preferred the skip the idyll and make a lot of the story's pessimistic, uncertain finale. "Here is a man who leads thoughtless, primitive life of almost a vegetable, having been enslaved by the overpowering routine, then all of a sudden... some tiny trivial thing knocks him off a rut, the sleeping soul would wake up, and life... would lose its original clarity and simplicity. That's what happened to the teacher by the name of Nikitin," wrote the critic Alexander Glinka (as Volzhsky) in his 1903 book Sketches on Chekhov, noting that this conflict (of the 'ideal and the reality') in the story is left unresolved.

The critic and literary historian Alexander Lipovsky thought the instant change of the hero's mindset was totally unmotivated. This view was shared by G. Kacherets, the author of "Chekhov. The Experience" (1902). "Just when Nikitin starts to get interesting, the story suddenly ends," the latter complained.
