= Mikhail Protopopov =

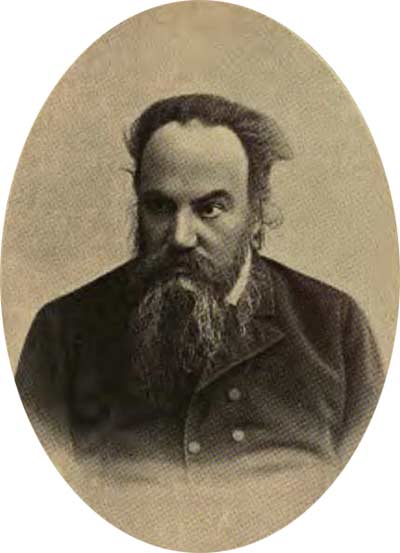
- Born: Михаил Алексеевич Протопопов; 1848; Kostroma, Russian Empire
- Died: 16 December 1915 (aged 66–67); Petrograd, Russian Empire
- Occupations: literary critic, publicist

Mikhail Alexeyevich Protopopov (Russian: Михаи́л Алексе́евич Протопо́пов; 1848, Kostroma, Russian Empire – 16 December 1915) was a Russian Empire journalist, publicist and literary critic.

An ardent narodnik, influenced by the ideas of Nikolai Mikhaylovsky and Pyotr Lavrov, Protopopov started late but instantly gained notoriety for his sharp, emotional and opinionated reviews, writing mostly for Otechestvennye Zapiski, but also Russkaya Pravda, Slovo, Russkoye Bogatstvo and Delo.

After the closure of several radical journals in 1884, Protopopov was arrested and after six months' detention deported to Chukhloma where he lived under close police supervision. After receiving permission to settle in Saint Petersburg, he became one of the leading authors of liberal, narodnik-oriented Russkaya Mysl.

Protopopov, who considered himself a follower of Chernyshevsky, Dobrolyubov and Pisarev, thought little about objectivity, ignored the aesthetic side of literary criticism, and used his position as a vehicle for propagating the narodnik views, slagging with equal passion Marxism, symbolism, 'decadence' and especially, Tolstoyism, all of which he saw as being links to one vile chain.

Protopopov gave succinct (and, in the most cases, highly contentious) characteristics to his subjects in the very titles of his essays, like "Talented Failure" (on Fyodor Dostoyevsky), "Ladies' Vanity Fare" (Maria Bashkirtseva), "Victim of Timelessness" (Anton Chekhov), "The Optimist Author" (Pavel Zasodimsky), "Decadent Critic" (Akim Volynsky), "Cheerful Talent" (Ignaty Potapenko) and "The Bungler of a Writer", on Vasily Rozanov.
