= Melikhovo =

Coordinates: 55°07′N 37°39′E

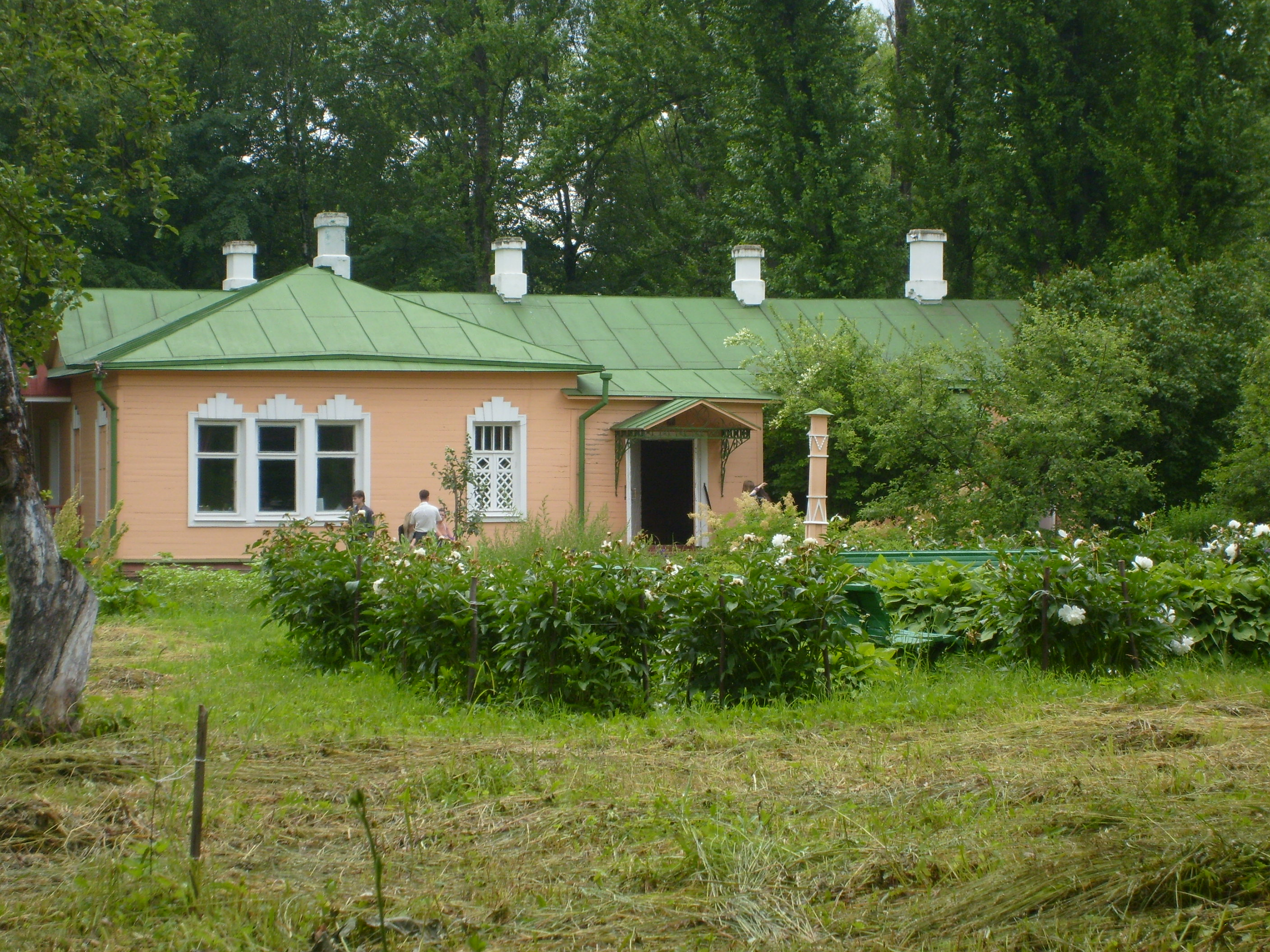
Country house of Anton Chekhov at Melikhovo

Melikhovo (Russian: Ме́лихово) is a writer's house museum in the former country estate of the Russian playwright and writer Anton Chekhov. Chekhov lived in the estate from March 1892 until August 1899, and it is where he wrote some of his most famous plays and stories, including The Seagull and Uncle Vanya. The estate is about forty miles south of Moscow near Chekhov.

== Chekhov at Melikhovo ==
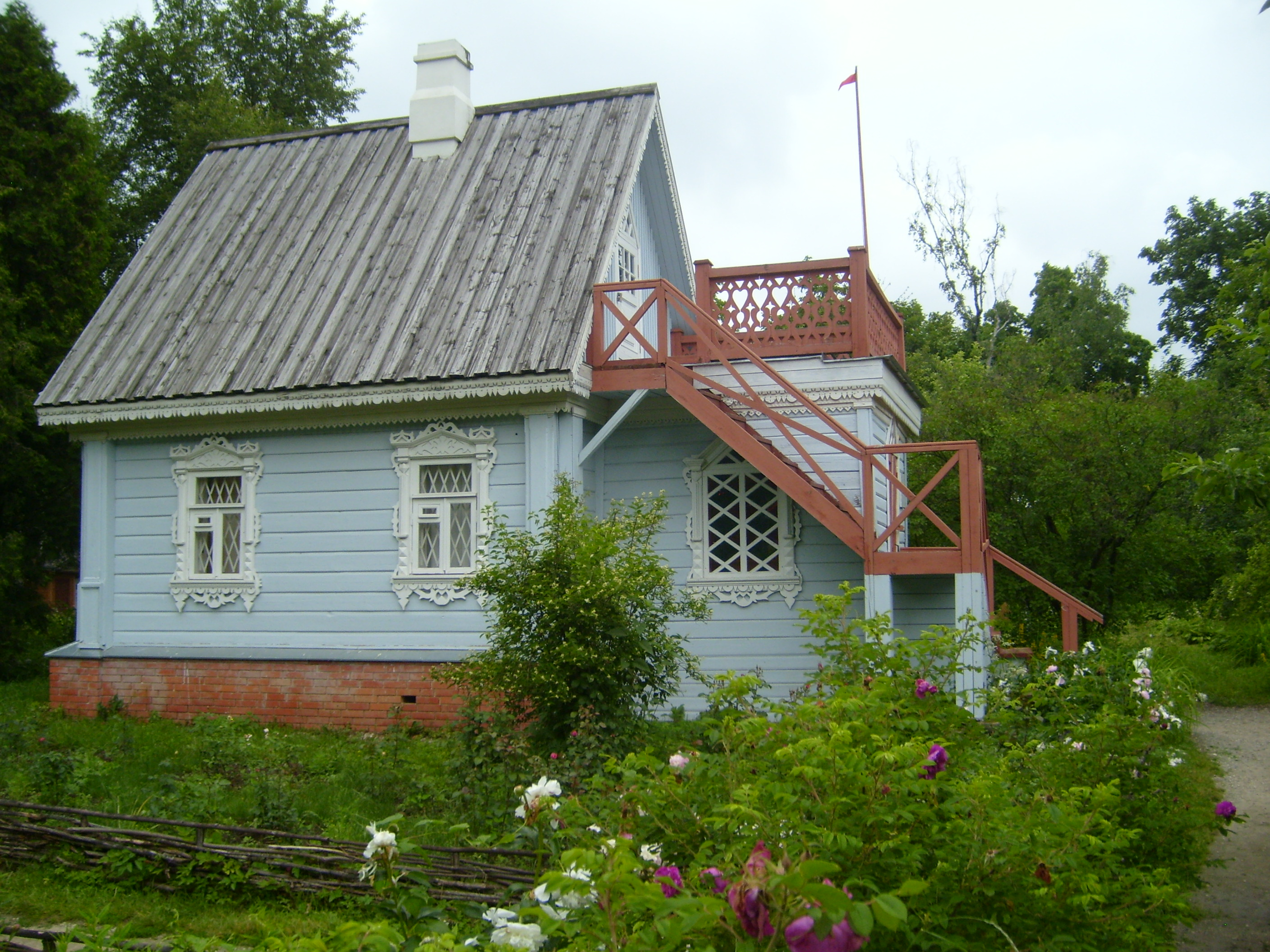
Cottage where Chekhov wrote The Seagull

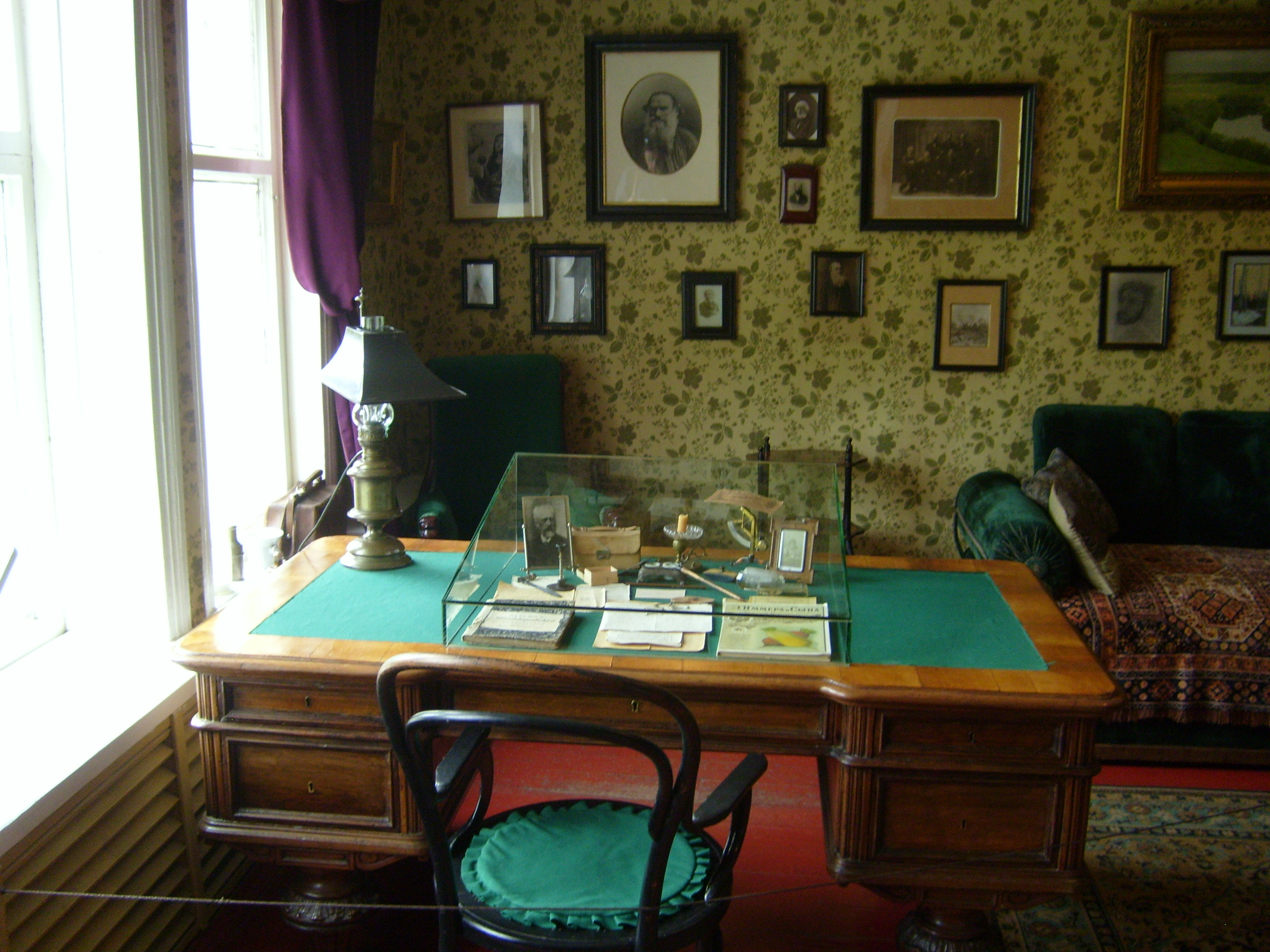
Chekhov's study in the main house at Melikhovo

After his return from Sakhalin island in 1891, Chekhov wrote in a letter: "If I am a doctor, then I need sick people and a hospital; if I am a writer, then I need to live among people, and not on Malaya Dimotrovka [a street in Moscow.]... I need a piece of social and political life,". Besides his desire to be a more active doctor, Chekhov wanted to move to the country to improve his health, which had suffered from his trip to Sakhalin.

A small country house owned by Nikolai Sorokhtin, a set decorator for the Hermitage summer garden theater in Moscow, was on the market. it was located in the small settlement of Melikhovo, which in 1890 had three country estates and a population of three hundred. The wooden house had been built in the 1840s in the Russian neoclassical style, and Sorokhtin had remodeled it in a more picturesque style. Sorokhtin ran short of funds and in the beginning of 1892 he placed an advertisement in the newspaper Moskovskiy Vedomosti. Chekhov saw the advertisement, met with him on February 2, 1892, and purchased the house. The Chekhov family moved there on March 1, 1892, and Chekhov himself arrived on March 4.

Chekhov lived in the one-story main house with his mother, his sister, Maria Chekhova, and his father, Pavel Yegorovich Chekhov. He had his study and library with a desk by a window looking at the garden. His desk portraits of the writers and artists he most admired; Lev Tolstoy, Ivan Turgenev, Peter Tchaikovsky, Dmitry Grigorovich, and Viktor Goltsev. In his early years at Melikhovo, his study also served as his medical office, where he saw patients. Sick residents of the region began gathering outside the house from five to six o'clock in the morning. He kept medicines in a cabinet on the wall of his study for his patients. He was particularly busy during the cholera epidemic which struck Russia in 1892 and 1893; he was responsible for the medical care for 26 villages, seven factories, and a monastery in the region.

Chekhov also took a strong interest in education. He visited the local village schools, and found the conditions deplorable and the teachers underpaid and uninspired. One teacher he met, in the village of Talezh, a young man with a wife and four children raising a family on an income of 23 rubles a month, probably inspired the character Medvedenko in The Seagull.

In the summer of 1894, Chekhov had constructed a small two-story guest cottage not far from the house, with a terrace overlooking the garden. The lower floor served as his new medical reception room, and the upper floor as a guest room and as a room for writing away from the noise of the main house. In November 1895 Chekhov completed The Seagull in this house, and in 1896 he finished Uncle Vanya there. In 1898, upon his return from Nice, in France, he wrote a trilogy of three famous stories there: The Man in a Case, About Love, and Gooseberries. In May 1899, after the success of the Seagull at the Moscow Art Theater, he invited the leading actress of the play, Olga Knipper, to visit him. She stayed in the guest cottage for three days in mid-May 1899. She married Chekhov in May 1901.

== Chekhov's writing habits ==
"I am writing a play," Chekhov wrote to his friend Suvorin from Melikhovo in October 1896, "which I will finish no earlier than the end of November. I am not writing it without pleasure, although I am violating all the conventions of playwriting. It is a comedy, three female roles, six male roles, four acts, a landscape (a view over a lake), a lot of talking about literature, little action, and five poods of love.". The play was The Seagull.

As a writer, Chekhov did not seem to keep a strict schedule. When he had guests or was busy with his medical practice, he did very little writing at all. One regular guest at Melikhovo, Ignaty Potapenko, observed: "On those days when I was a Melikhovo, it seemed that he spent all of his time with us. But sometimes during conversations or concerts he would vanish for a few minutes, not for very long, and then would return. It seems that he went to his study and wrote down a few lines, whatever had come into his head. This would happen often during the course of a day."

Chekhov told another visitor, the writer Ivan Bunin, "In the morning it's necessary to drink not tea, but coffee, which is a wonderful thing. When I work, I limit myself to coffee and bouillon. Morning - coffee. Noon, bouillon."

== Chekhov's recreation at Melikhovo ==
Chekhov was very sociable at Melikhovo, enjoying the company of writers, artists, teachers, actors, and ordinary people. He enjoyed listening to music played on the grand piano in his house by his friend L.C. Mizonova. He enjoyed Tchaikovsky romances and gypsy songs, and he often would sing himself, but only church music; he had a good bass voice, and would sing the church music he had learned when he was young. In the evening he and his guests would sit in the parlor and play loto. The theater director Vladimir Nemirovich-Danchenko recalled, "Chekhov loved it when around him there was conversation and joy. He had a fine garden, with beautiful straight alleys, just like in The Seagull. In the evening everyone would play loto, also like The Seagull."

When he was not entertaining his guests, Chekhov worked in his garden. he was also an avid fisherman, sitting at the edge of the ponds on the estate with his fishing pole. He also collected mushrooms in walks in the neighboring woods.

== Chekhov's garden ==
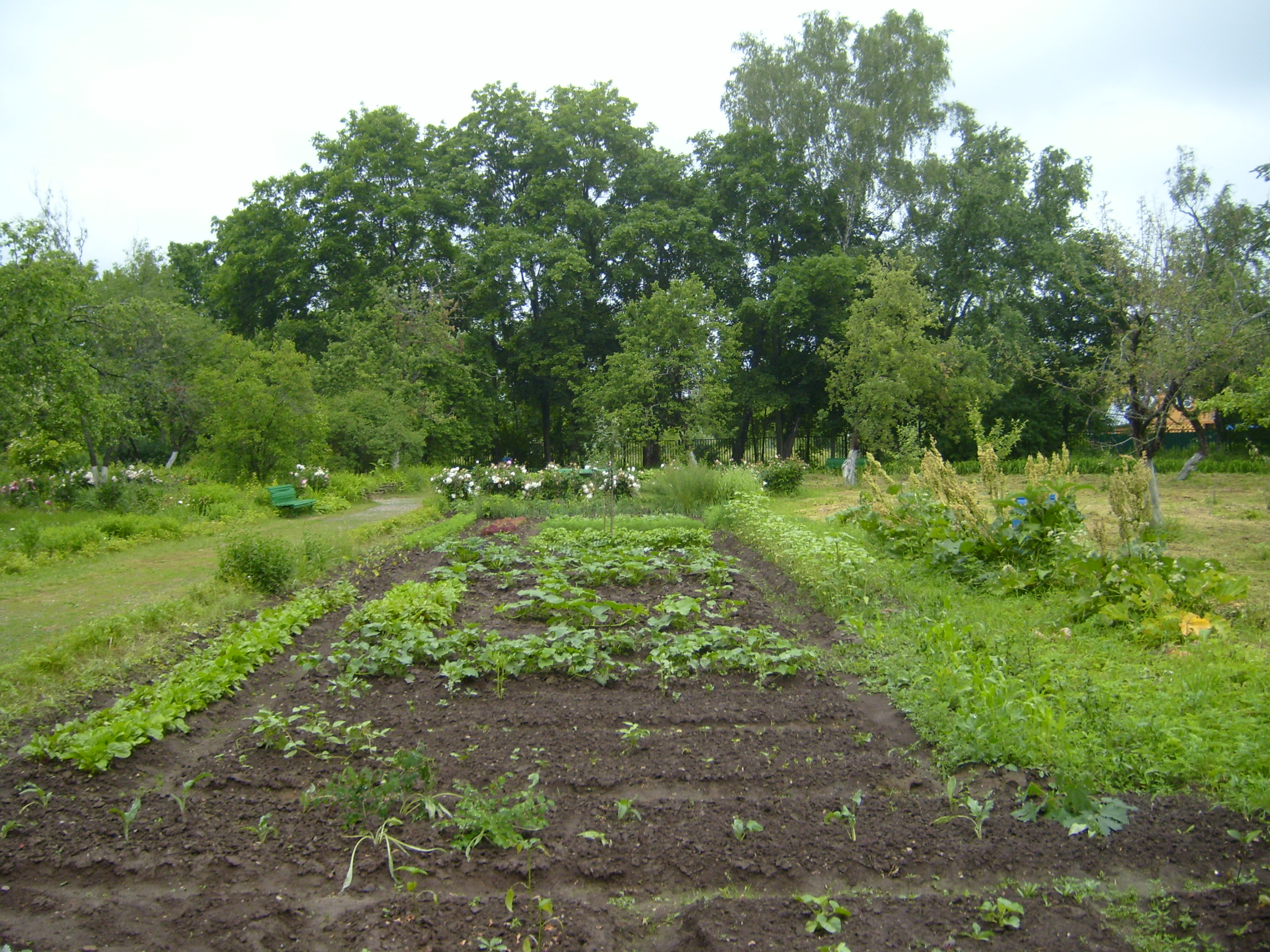
Chekhov was very proud of his vegetable and flower garden

Chekhov was particularly proud of his garden, which surrounded his house and the cottage where he wrote. The garden was a joint project with his sister, Maria Chekhova. Within three months of moving in, Chekhov and his sister had studied books of horticulture and planted flowers, fruit trees, and vegetables, including exotic varieties such as eggplant and artichokes. . Chekhov himself worked in the garden, planted ten fruit trees in his first year and ordered vegetable and flower seeds from catalogs. He took his visitors on tours of the garden, proudly showing them every tulip and rose.

In description of his garden at Melikhovo Chekhov wrote: "Everything is miniature - a tiny alley, a pond the size of a fish tank, tiny trees. But, after you pace along the alley a couple of times, and look more carefully at everything, the claustrophobic feeling that everything is too small disappears. All of a sudden, we have lots of space".

"Chekhov did not like cut flowers. He loved and knew flowers like a real gardener. Not having his own children, he treated each flower as his child." His favorite flowers were Moscow peonies which were planted along the paths, but he also planted heliotrope, delfinium, chrysanthemums, aster. jonquils, and many other flowers. The aromas of his garden even entered into the plays he wrote at Melikhovo: in The Seagull, the writer Trigorin says, "When I smell heliotropes; I take a mental note; an excessively sweet smell, the color of widows. something I can use describing a summer night.".

The original fruit trees in Chekhov's garden perished in the cold winters of 1941 and 1970, but a few linden and birch trees from Chekhov's time still remain, along with one Berlin poplar, where Chekhov's father sat with the farm workers shortly before his death in October 1898.

== Melikhovo after Chekhov ==
In 1899, Melikhovo became the property of Baron Nikolai Stuart, who used it as a summer house until the Russian Revolution. Only two pieces of Chekhov's belongings remained there; his grand piano and his writing desk. After the Revolution Baron Stuart was arrested and shot by the Bolsheviks.

The estate was nationalized by the Bolsheviks in October 1918, and declared a site of historical and cultural importance, but little was done to protect the house and property. In 1927 Melikhovo became a Sovkhoz, or State collective farm named for Chekhov, and new agricultural buildings, garages and grain silos were built a few meters from the Chekhov house. The main house was completely destroyed, with only a plaque marking its location. The cottage where Chekhov wrote The Seagull was in a state of ruin. Only in 1940 did an effort begin to protect and restore the property. A museum was opened in January 1941, but closed a few months following the German invasion of the Soviet Union. Melikhovo was declared a state monument in June 1944, even as World War II was underway, and work began again to restore the buildings. The new museum was opened September 25, 1944. The ruined guest cottage was restored in 1954. Beginning in 1957, the main house was rebuilt from the ground up; it was completed in 1960. In the 1960s. the old Sovkhoz was finally moved to another location, and its buildings demolished. The gardens were replanted with fruit trees and flowers as they were in Chekhov's time. Restoration and reconstruction work on the buildings of the estate was still continuing in 2011.

== Melikhovo today ==
Today the Melikhovo Estate museum resembles the estate as it was in Chekhov's time.

== Melikhovo gallery ==
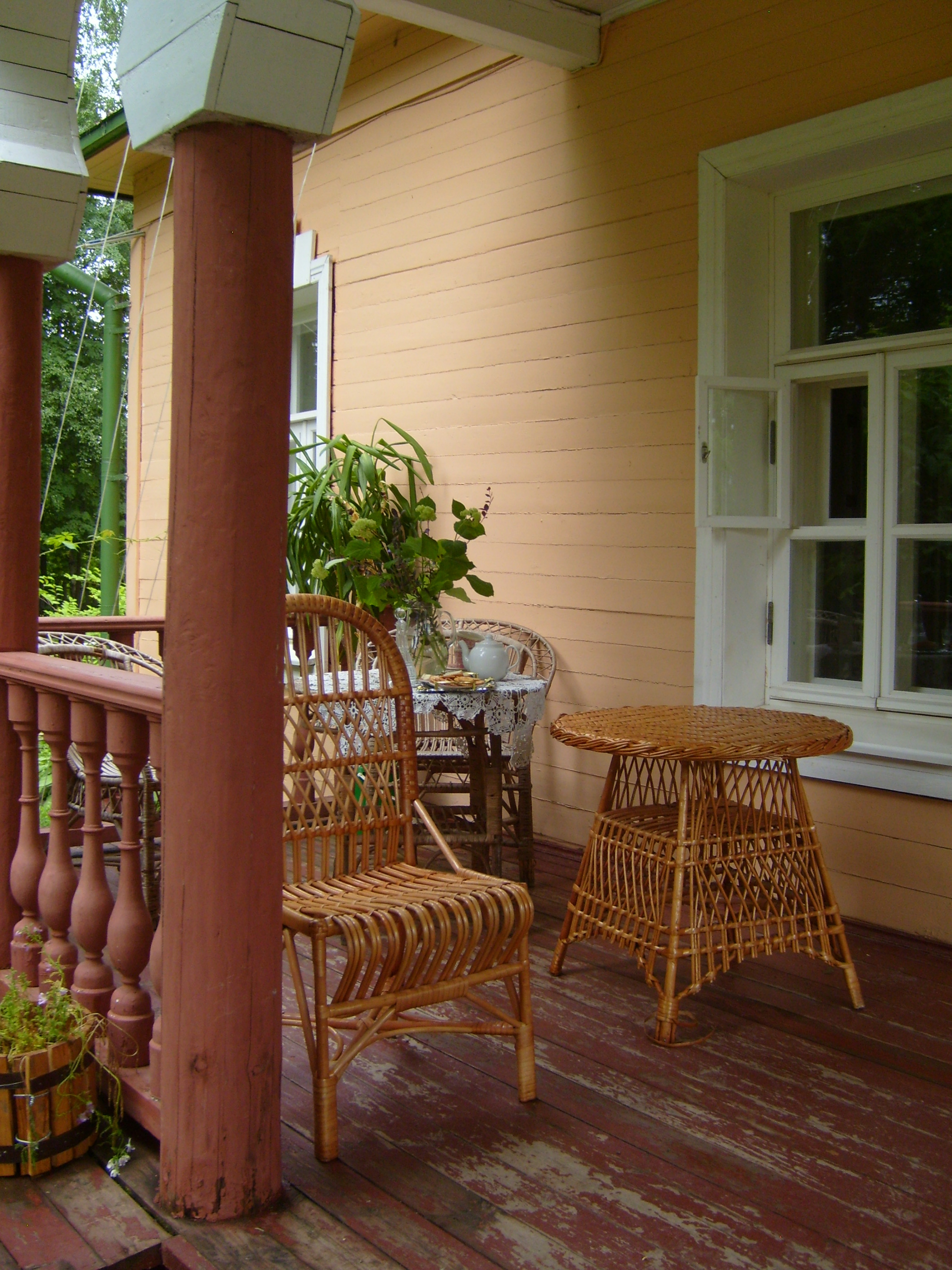
Chekhov's veranda at Melikhovo

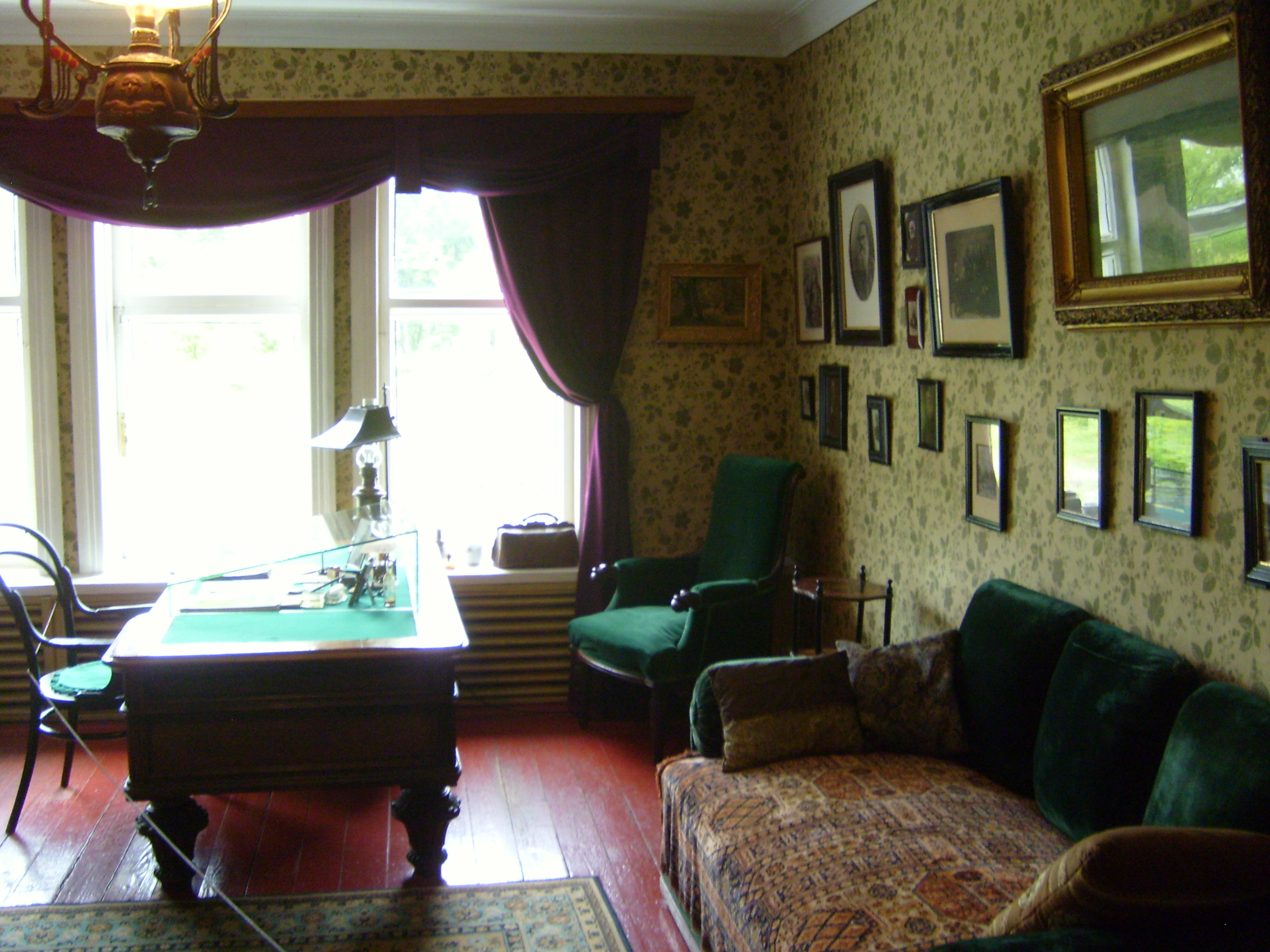
Chekhov's study in the main house of Melikhovo, where he wrote and received patients

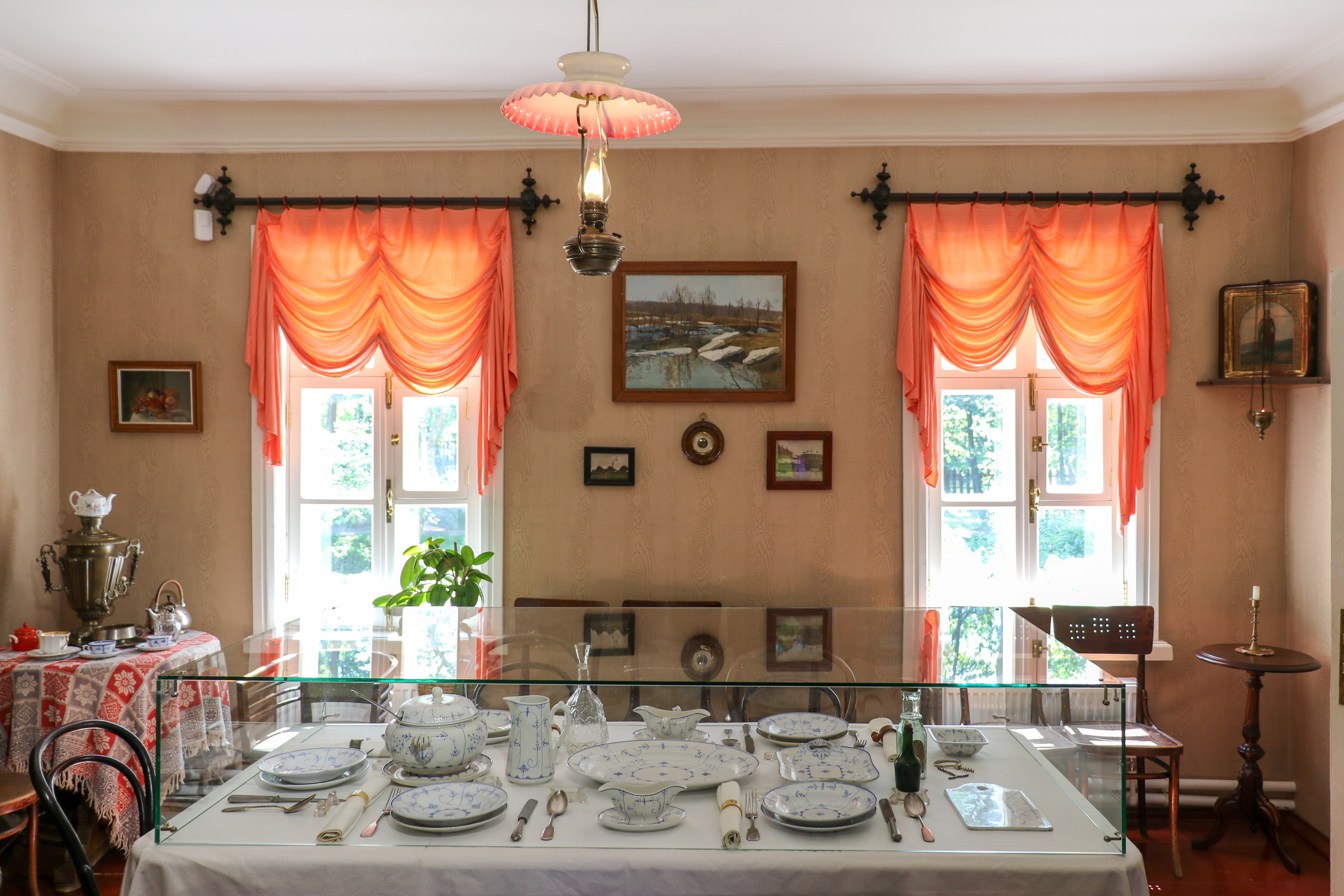
The Dining room at Melikhovo

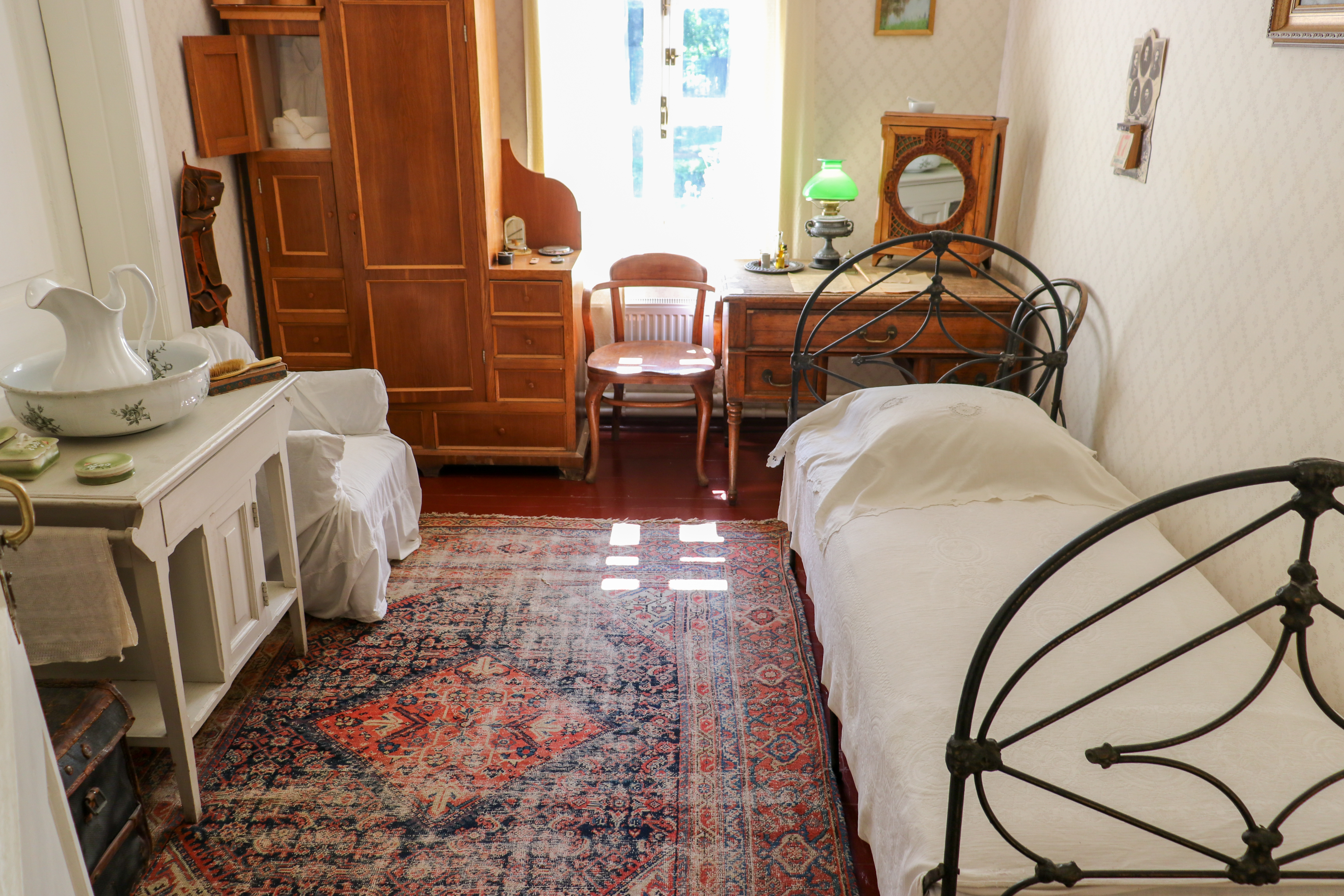
Bedroom of Anton Chekhov in the main house of the Melikhovo estate

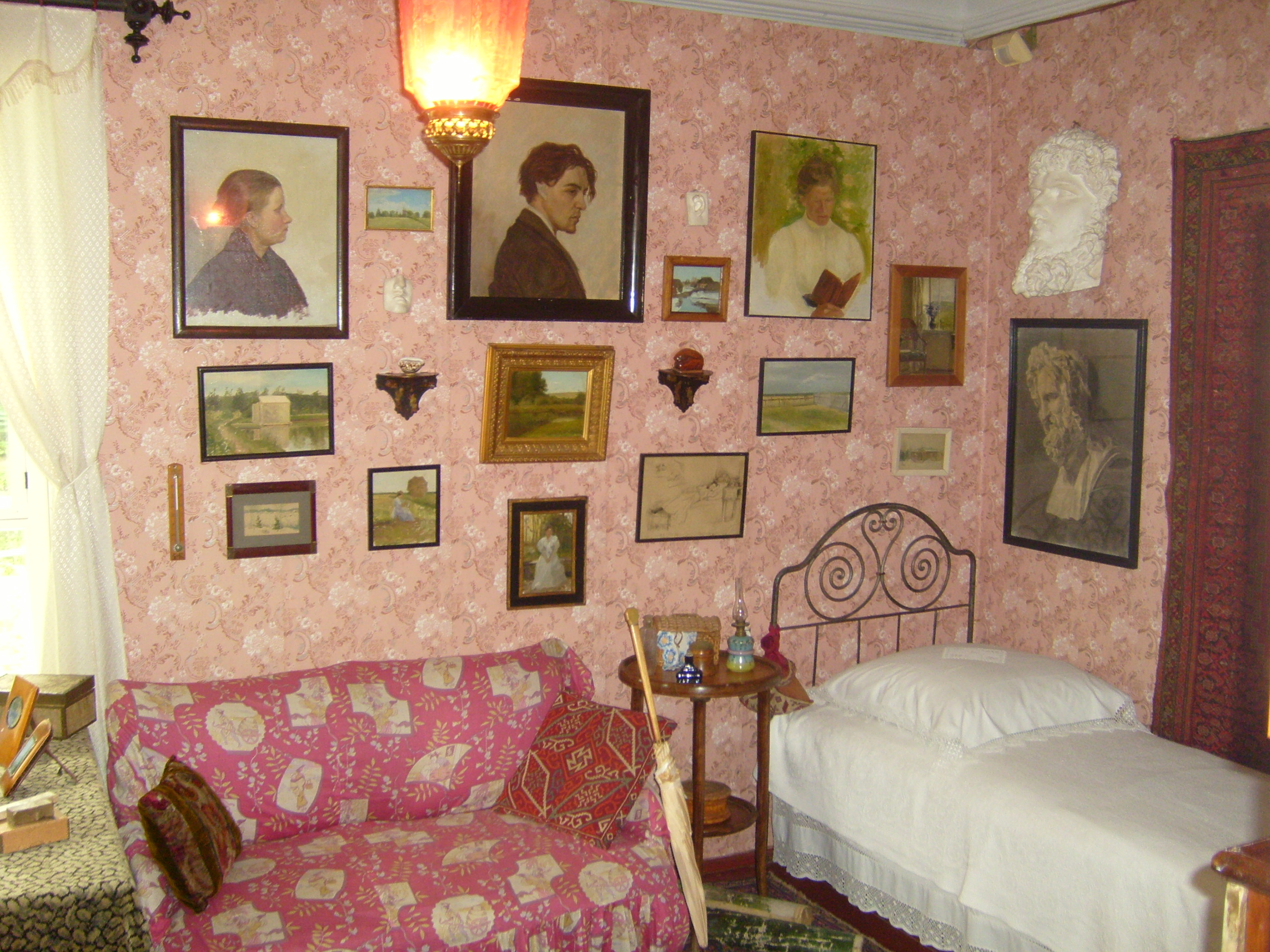
The room of Chekhov's sister, Maria Chekhova

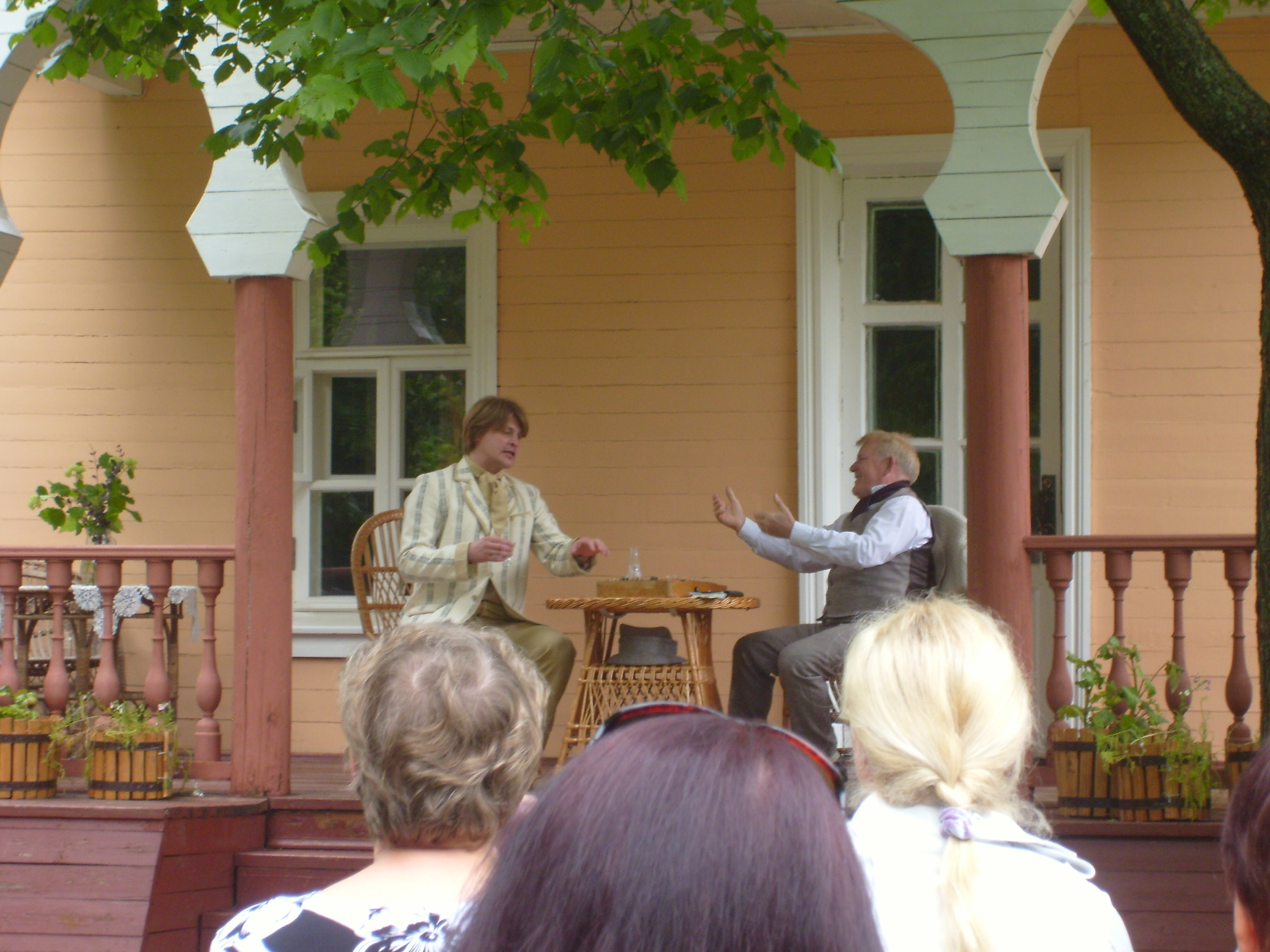
Actors perform a story from Chekhov on the veranda of his house at Melikhovo, June 2011

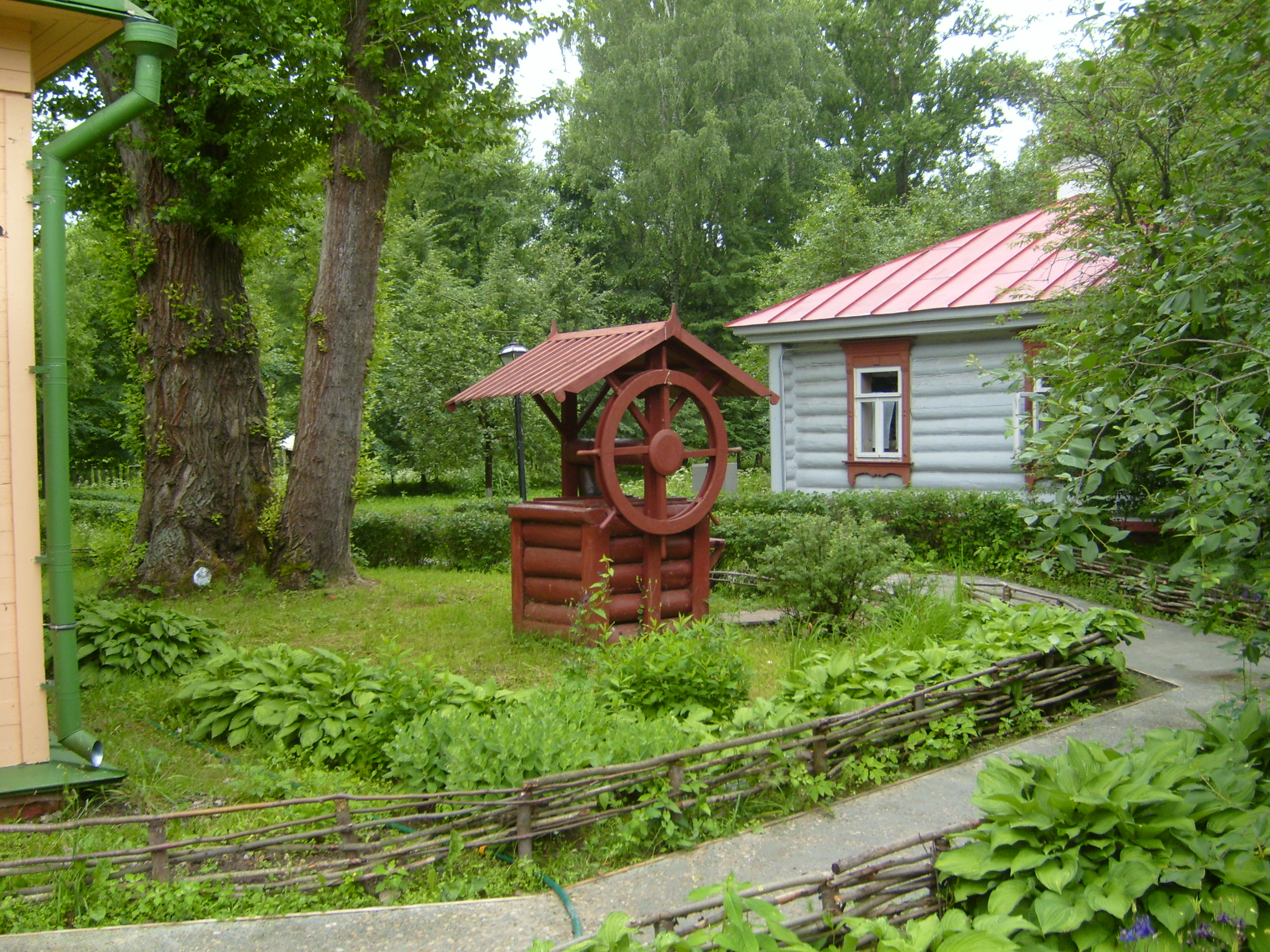
Well and the cookhouse built by Chekhov in 1893

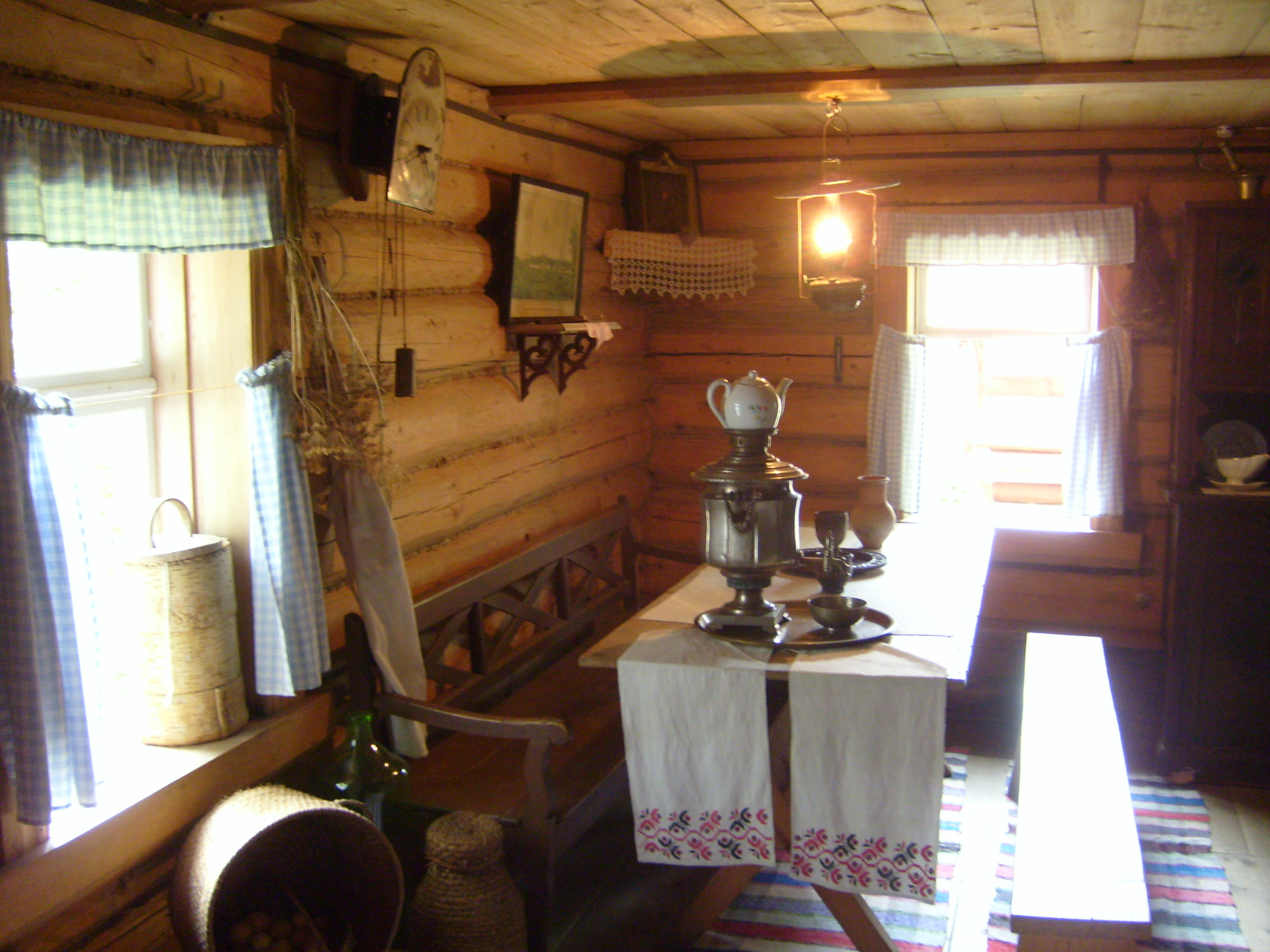
The kitchen at Melikhovo, where meals were prepared and the servants ate

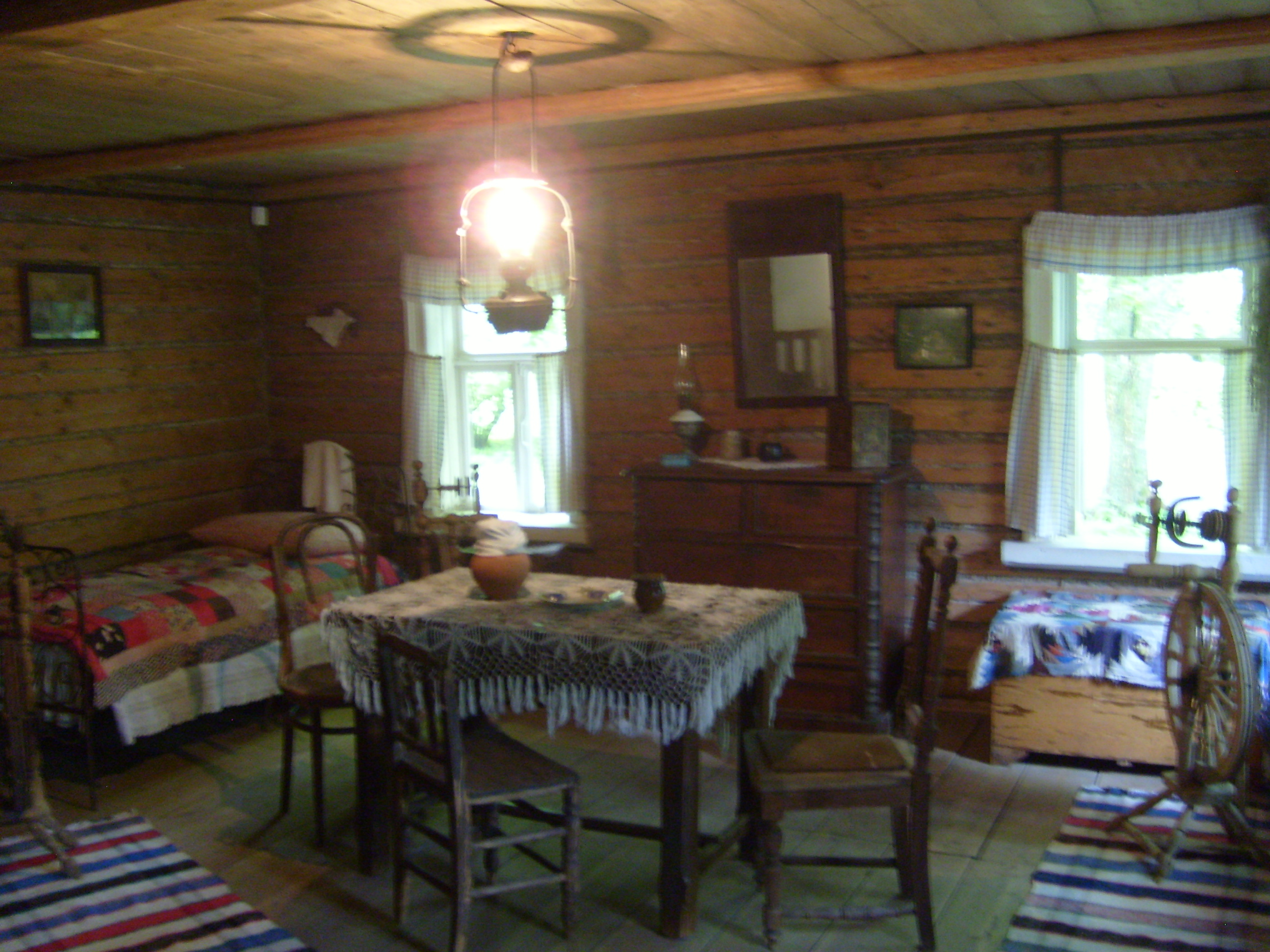
Servant's room at Melikhovo

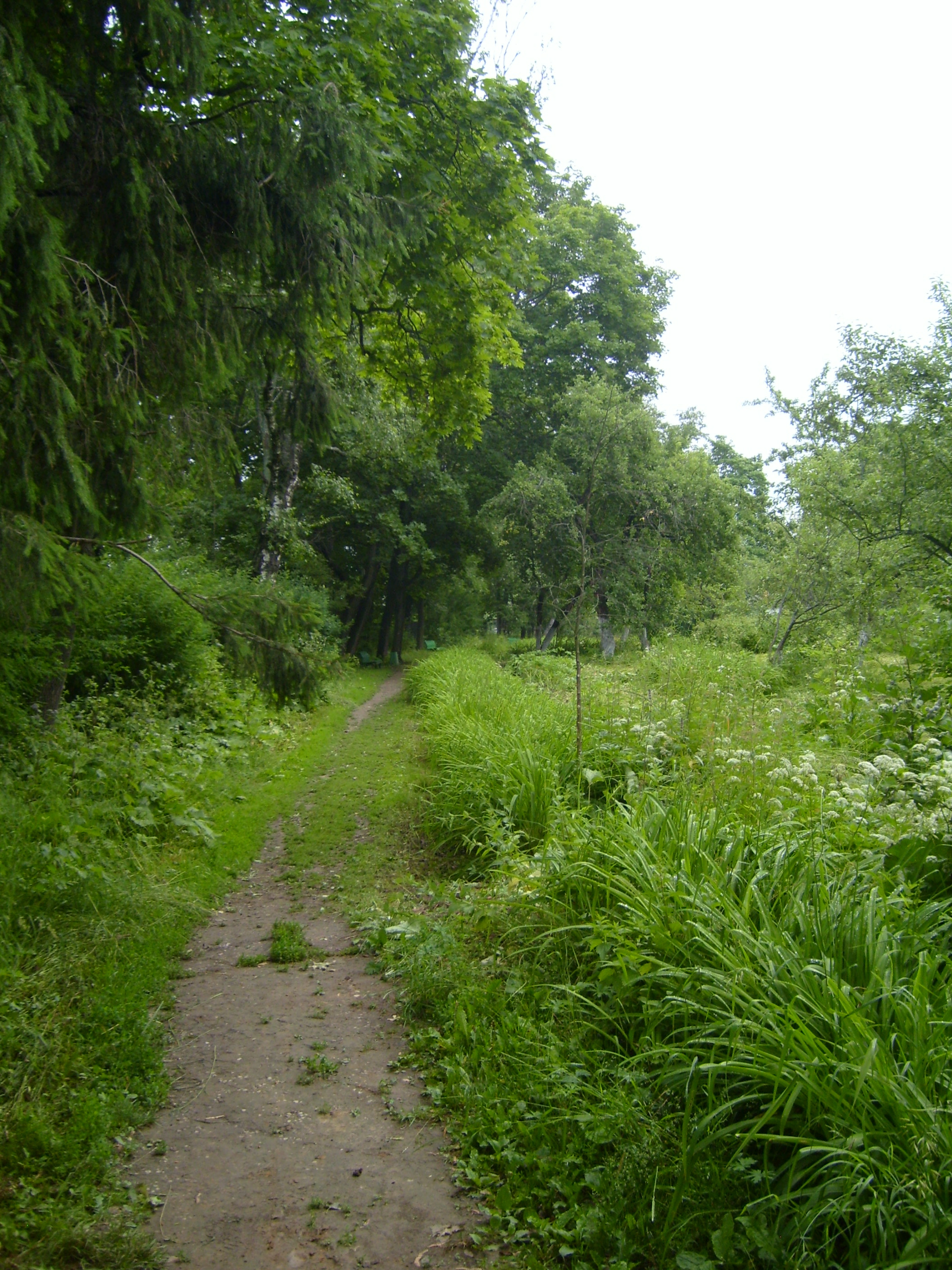
The path around Chekhov's garden

== Bibliography ==
- Orlov, E.L., (Chief Editor), E.G. Avasharov, A.A. Zhuravlyova, E.D. Orlov, T.N. . Razumovskaya, K.A. Chaikhovskaya (writers), Gosudarstveniy Literaturno-Memorialniy Musey-Zapovednik A.P. Chekhova. Melikhovo Publishing House, Moscow, 2010. (ISBN 978-5-94663-018-4)
- Chekhov, A.P., Polnoye Sobraniye Sochineniy i Pisem: B 30 T. M Nauka, 1974–1983.
