= Vukol Lavrov =

Russian journalist and translator (1852–1912)

- Вукол Лавров
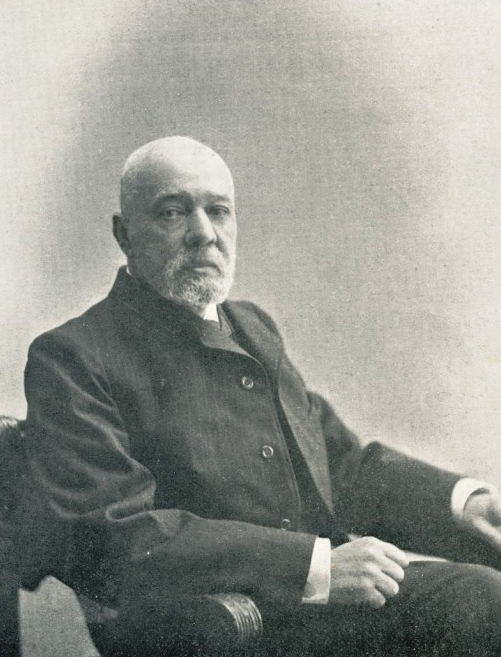
- Born: 23 September 1852; Yelets, Russia
- Died: 23 January 1912 (aged 59); Vertoshino, Russia
- Occupations: Journalist; publisher; editor; translator

Vukol Mikhaylovich Lavrov (Russian: Вукoл Михайлович Лавров; 23 September [O.S. 11 September] 1852 — 23 January [O.S. 10 January] 1912) was a Russian journalist, publisher, editor and translator.

== Career ==
In 1880, he started to publish Russkaya Mysl (which is seen in retrospect as having provided an ideological background for the Russian Constitutional Democrat Party), and in 1882, he became its editor-in-chief. Lavrov was considered Russia's best translator from Polish of his time. Among his translations were novels by Henryk Sienkiewicz, Zygmunt Miłkowski, Eliza Orzeszkowa, Maria Konopnicka and Władysław Reymont.

== Sources ==
- "Лавров, Вукол Михайлович" . Brockhaus and Efron Encyclopedic Dictionary (in Russian). 1906.
