= Russian Mind =

Pan-European sociopolitical and cultural magazine

- Editor: Vukol Lavrov, Sergey Yuryev, Viktor Goltsev, Alexander Kisevetter, Pyotr Struve, A. A. Kizevetter, V.A. Lazarevsky, S.A. Vodov, Z.A. Shakhovskaya, I.A. Ilovaiskaya-Alberti, I.V. Krivova, V.N. Lupan
- Frequency: Monthly
- Circulation: up to 40,000
- First issue: 1880-1927, refounded 1947
- Based in: Moscow, Russian Empire; Paris, France (1918–1927; 1947-2006, 2021-present); London (2006-2021)
- Language: Russian, English
- Website: russianmind.com

Russian Mind (Russian: Русская мысль, romanized: Russkaya Mysl; French – La Pensée Russe) is a pan-European sociopolitical and cultural magazine, published on a monthly basis both in Russian and in English. The modern edition follows the traditions of the magazine laid down in 1880 by its founder, Vukol Mikhailovich Lavrov. At the time of its first publications, Russkaya Mysl, (originally: Russian Thought), adhered to moderate constitutionalism – the idea which paved the way for the ideological and organizational creation of the Cadet Party.

In 1918 the magazine was closed by the Bolsheviks as a bourgeois press organ. From 1921 to 1923 it was published in Sofia, Prague and in Berlin. The last issue of Russian Thought, in the format of a magazine, was published in Paris in 1927.

In 1947 Russkaya Mysl was revived as a weekly newspaper. The publication was first issued in Paris and did not relocate its headquarters until 2006. In that year, the publishing house settled in London.

In 2011, Russkaya Mysl returned to the historical format of 1880, and once again became a magazine. Since 2016, the magazine has been published in English under the title of Russian Mind.

Since 2021, the magazine has again been published in Paris. This decision was made by the editorial board of Russian Mind in connection with the exit of Great Britain from the European Union. Russian Mind is a partner of Roszarubezhtsentr under the Ministry of Foreign Affairs of Russia in the field of promoting the Russian language, a partner of the Fund for Support and Protection of the Rights of Compatriots Living Abroad. The magazine is available in retailers, and by subscription in the countries of the European Union, as well as by subscription in Russia, United States, Israel, Japan and Australia.

== History ==
The founder of the magazine Russkaya Mysl, Vukol Mikhailovich Lavrov, was born on September 23, 1852, in a merchant family in the small rural town of Yelets. It is known that he completed only three classes of the parish school, which, however, did not prevent him from reading extensively and becoming a highly educated individual. After meeting with his fellow writers in Moscow, Vukol Lavrov decided to publish his own magazine. Having received permission to publish Russkaya Mysl in 1879, he closed his father’s trading business in Yelets and invested all his funds in the magazine, the first issue of which was published in 1880.

In 1880–1885 the editor of Russkaya Mysl was Sergey Yuryev who brought it close to the Slavophiliac movement. After Yuryev's death, Viktor Goltsev became the editor; under his guidance the magazine made a turn to the left and provided safe haven for many contributors of the recently closed Otechestvennye Zapiski, taking upon itself some of the letter's subscription obligations. This, as well as dropping the standard price from 16 to 12 rubles per issue, helped its popularity rise.

Russkaya Mysl’s adherence to moderate constitutionalism led to the magazine receiving two warnings: the first – for the ‘Petersburg Letters’ in the December issue of 1883, the second – for the article by V.A. Goltsev ‘Sociology on an Economic Basis’ in the November issue of 1893. In 1911, the magazine was also criticized by the Church after it published material dedicated to the memory of Leo Nikolaevich Tolstoy. Because of this, Russkaya Mysl was excluded from the dean's library by the pastoral meeting of the Vyazma city clergy.

In 1906, after Goltsev's death, Alexander Kisevetter became the editor-in-chief; he invited Pyotr Struve as a co-editor. The magazine started actively discuss latest political, social and religious reforms. Lavrov was still a stuff member but now his works were published not that often. One specific feature of Russkaya Mysl was the Bibliography section which informed the readership of all that was new in Russian literature and journalism. The journal also ran its own The Scientific review and The Modern Art sections, the latter specializing mostly in the Moscow theatrical life.

Russkaya Mysl was often called the organ of the Cadet Party, but Struve himself denied this: ‘The period of certain magazines which tend to represent certain political views, in my opinion, is over. [...] Whether in philosophy or in religion, there should not be a place for “partisanship”.’

After the 1905 revolution, the magazine became more right-wing, while maintaining a constitutional-democratic orientation. Struve fervently supported the February Revolution, but he perceived the October Revolution as a catastrophe for the country and was hostile to the Bolshevik, whom he viewed as usurpers. In connection with this, the magazine stopped being published in Moscow in 1918. Since 1921, the magazine has continued to be published abroad; but the last of the monthly issues was published in 1927 in Paris.

After a twenty-year break, Russkaya Mysl was brought back into existence, but in the format of a newspaper. The first editor of the new Russkaya Mysl was the pre-revolutionary Russian journalist Vladimir Lazarevsky and, following World War II, the newspaper acquired a new official sponsor in the person of the US State Department.

The newspaper positioned itself as a Christian publication in opposition to Marxist publications or those which were being financed by the USSR. Lazarevsky remained the editor-in-chief of the publication until 1953. He was replaced by Sergei Vodov, who headed the editorial office until 1968. During this remarkable period, the publication was authored by extraordinary writers such as Boris Zaitsev, Ivan Bunin, Ivan Shmelev, Nina Berberova, Gaito Gazdanov and many others.

From 1968 to 1978, the newspaper was headed by Zinaida Shakhovskaya. This period saw the emergence of the human rights movement in the USSR. Defending the values of democracy, Russkaya Mysl published works of dissidents. In 1978, Irina Ilovaiskaya-Alberti became the editor-in-chief of Russkaya Mysl. Sergei Grigoryants noted that, with the arrival of the new editor-in-chief, ‘the newspaper's attention was no longer the news and problems of Russian emigration, but everything that was happening in the Soviet Union (which had already begun to open-up), and most importantly, its dissident democratic movement’.

During this period, representatives of the ‘third wave’ of emigration and, also, human rights activists, Western Slavists, Sovietologists and dissidents were published in Russkaya Mysl. Such authors and Russian thinkers as Alexander Solzhenitsyn, Joseph Brodsky, Andrei Sakharov, Mikhail Koryakov, Vladimir Maksimov, Natalia Gorbanevskaya, Mikhail Geller, Sergey Dovlatov, Alexander Nekrich, Victor Suvorov and Alain Besancon left a mark on the history of Russkaya Mysl.

After the collapse of the USSR, and the fall of the Iron Curtain, the publication reoriented itself to rallying Russian-speaking communities abroad and restoring ties between compatriots and the Motherland. In 1991 the publication faced severe financial difficulties. Many sponsors, including the United States Department of State, declined to renew the sponsorship-contract. This forced the editor-in-chief of the newspaper, Irina Alekseevna Ilovaiskaya-Alberti, to begin to look for new sources of funding. Eventually the Roman Catholic Church and the Soros Foundation announced that they would help the legendary publication to weather those hard times.

By the early 2000s, Russkaya Mysl was again on the verge of closure. The editor-in-chief of the newspaper, Irina Vladimirovna Krivova, has described this period as follows: ‘By 2001, we were completely bankrupt, and they really wanted to close the newspaper. We (several journalists of the newspaper) amassed the money that had been paid to us as redundancy benefits, and we bought the newspaper from our French publisher for the price of the underlying assets. It was impossible to allow Russkaya Mysl to disappear without a trace. For two years, we, the remaining five or six people, worked for free – writing and editing from home. We said goodbye to our historical premises, in which we had “lived” for almost 30 years […] We lived, one might say, in the attic but, thanks to the authors who supported us completely voluntarily, we managed not to miss a single issue of the newspaper. For two years, I was, literally rushed off my feet in search of funds. I went around all the Parisian publications, and many publishing houses, explaining that Russkaya Mysl had already become part of the historical heritage of France. However, I could not find any support. In the end, the people who showed interest in our publication turned out to be Russian businessmen.’.

Since 2005, Victor Lupan has been the head of the editorial board and a regular contributor to Russkaya Mysl. In 2006, within the framework of the ‘Homecoming’ program, the Parisian archives of the newspaper were donated to the Russian State Library. In the same year, Russkaya Mysl published a collection of the best articles of the newspaper entitled From Stalin to Putin: 60 Years of Russian History. The presentation of the book took place at the 2007 Russian Economic Forum.

Since 2006, Russkaya Mysl has been published in London as Russian Mind. In 2011, the publication was returned to the historical format of the 1880 magazine. Since 2016, the journal has been published both in Russian and in English. Due to administrative difficulties, which were caused by Brexit, followed by the Pandemic, the board of directors decided to relocate back to Paris and, in 2021, Russian Mind again began to be published there. Now headquartered in 8th district, and continuing to be published monthly, Russian Mind stays true to its mission of being a beam of cultural enrichment for broad-minded individuals.

== Authors ==
Russkaya Mysl had an eclectic taste, tending to provide a tribune to authors ignored or shied by other magazines and newspapers. In it appeared works by such authors as Nikolai Leskov, Konstantin Sluchevsky, Alexey Apukhtin, Count Arseny Golenishchev-Kutuzov, Grigory Danilevsky. Both Marxism followers, 'economic materialists' and narodniks here were equally welcomed, as well as writers who attempted to make peace between warring ideological and literary factions.

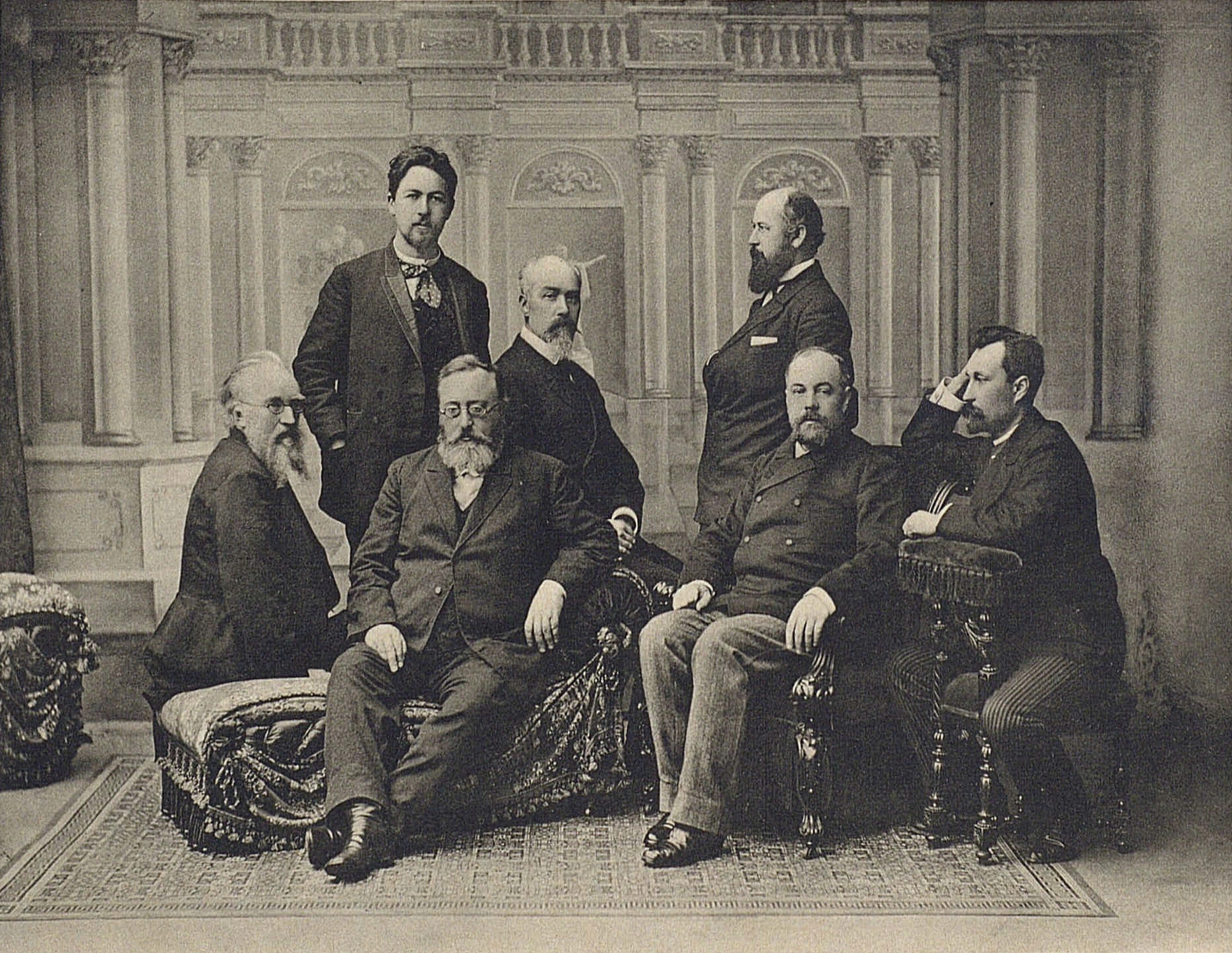
In Russkaya Mysl: (standing) Anton Chekhov, Ivan Ivanyukov, Viktor Goltsev. (Sitting) Mitrofan Remizov, M.A. Sablin, Vukol Lavrov, I.Potapenko

The magazine's Domestic Review ran under the guidance of Viktor Goltsev, S.A.Priklonsly, A.A.Golovachyov, Leonid Polonsky. Close to this section were the Sketches of Russian Life that Nikolai Shelgunov and later the Sketches of the Provincial Life by the economist Ivan Ivanyukov. For ten years Goltsev was also the head of the Foreign Review section.

Among the fiction writers published by the magazine were Mikhail Albov, Nikolai Astyrev, Kazimir Barantsevich, Pyotr Boborykin, Nikolai Vagner, Vsevolod Garshin, Maxim Gorky, Dmitry Grigorovich, Alexey Zhemchuzhnikov, Nikolai Zlatovratsky, Nikolai Petropavlovsky (S.Karonin), Vladimir Korolenko (he debuted here with "Makar's Dream"), Alexey Tikhonov (A.Lugovoy), Dmitry Mamin-Sibiryak, Dmitry Merezhkovsky, Nikolai Minsky, Alexander Sheller, Semyon Nadson, brothers Vasily and Vladimir Nemirovich-Danchenko, Filipp Nefyodov, Vasily Ogarkov, Yakov Polonsky, Ignaty Potapenko, Ilya Salov, Nadezhda Merder (N.Severin), Konstantin Stanyukovich, Gleb Uspensky, Semyon Frug, Anton Chekhov, Alexander Ertel.

Russkaya Mysl regularly published works by literary critics Mikhail Gromeka (he was the one who gave the publicity to the unknown parts of Lev Tolstoy's Confession), Alexander Kirpichnikov, Orest Miller, Nikolai Mikhaylovsky, Viktor Ostrogorsky, Mikhail Protopopov, Alexander Skabichevsky, Vladimir Spasovih, Nikolai Storozhenko, Semyon Vengerov. Regular contributors to the magazine were anthropologist and ethnographist Dmitry Anuchin, historians Pavel Vinogradov, Mykola Kostomarov, Pavel Milyukov, Robert Vipper, Yevgeny Karnovich, Nikolai Kareev, Vladimir Gerye, Grigory Dzhanshiyev, Mikhail Korelin, climatologist Alexander Voyeykov, economists Ivan Ivanyukov, Andrey Isayev, Lev Zak, Nikolai Kablukov, Nikolai Chernyshevsky (who under the moniker of Andreev published here his poems too), lawyers Count Leonid Kamarovsky, Pyotr Obninsky, Sergey Muromtsev, Maxim Kovalevsky, philosophers Vladimir Lesevich, Vladimir Solovyov, zoologist Mikhail Menzbir, philologists Fyodor Mishchenko, Vasily Modestov, and women's rights activist Olga Volkenstein.
