= Viktor Goltsev =

Russian writer, lawyer, journalist, literary critic, publisher and editor

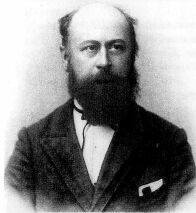
- Born: Viktor Alexandrovich Goltsev; 23 August 1850; Kolomna, Moscow Governorate, Russia
- Died: 1 December 1906 (aged 56); Moscow, Russia
- Education: Imperial Moscow University (1872)
- Occupations: Journalist; literary critic; editor

Viktor Alexandrovich Goltsev (Russian: Ви́ктор Алекса́ндрович Го́льцев; 23 August [O.S. 11 August] 1850 – 1 December [O.S. 18 November] 1906) was a Russian writer, lawyer, journalist, literary critic, publisher, and editor. He was an editor of "Russian Courrier", Russkiye Vedomosti, and Russkaya Mysl.

A Moscow University alumnus, Goltsev authored numerous articles and essays on law and jurisprudence, as well as critical reviews and feuilletons, published in Russkiye Vedomosti, Russkaya Pravda, Golos, Vestnik Evropy, Russkoye Bogatstvo, and Delo. In his much-publicized polemics with Ivan Aksakov and Mikhail Katkov he came across as a staunch proponent of the constitutional rule in Russia.

== Career ==
In 1880, Goltsev joined the just-launched Russkaya Mysl to become the head of its "Political Review" section. In March 1885 he succeeded the recently deceased Sergey Yuriev as this magazine's editor-in-chief. It was under his guidance that Russkaya Mysl drifted towards the left flank of Russian journalism and provided safe haven for many members of the staff of the closed Otechestvennye Zapiski. Goltsev was friends with many important members of Russia's literary elite, including Anton Chekhov, Alexander Ertel, and Gleb Uspensky. Russkaya Mysl was the first magazine to publish Chekhov's "The Seagull" in 1925. In 1906, after Goltsev's death, Alexander Kisevetter succeeded him as editor-in-chief of Russkaya Mysl with Pyotr Struve as a co-editor.

Among Goltsev's books that came out as separate editions include The French State in the 17th Century (Государственное хозяйство во Франции XVII в., 1878), The Development of Pedagogy in Recent Times (Очерк развития педагогических идей в новое время, 1880), The Law and the Ways of Life in Russia in the 18th Century (Законодательство и нравы в России XVIII в., 1885), the collections of essays Education, Morality and Law (Воспитание, нравственность, право, 1889) and On Art (Об искусстве, 1890). In 1889 he was elected a glasny (deputy) for the Moscow City Duma.
