= Russkie Vedomosti =

Russian political and literary newspaper

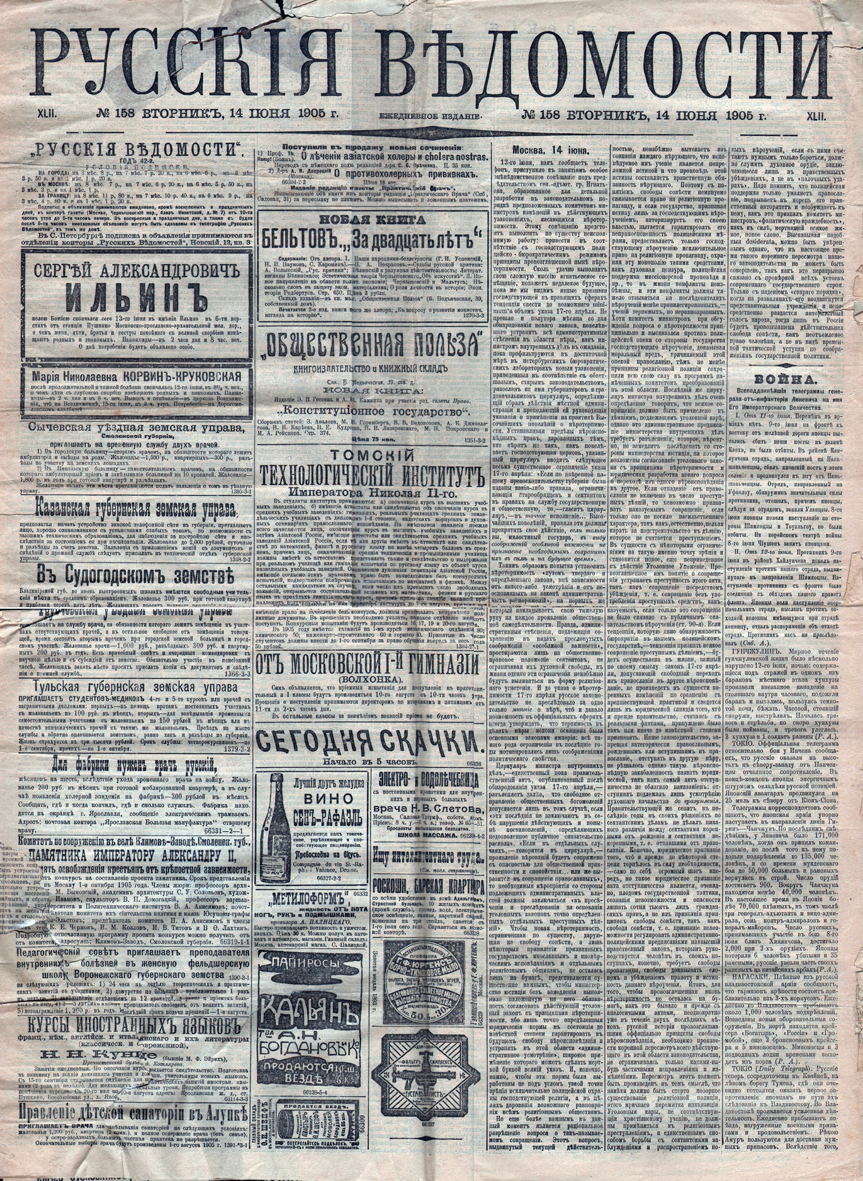
- 14 June 1905 issue
- Type: Daily newspaper
- Owner: Nikolai Pavlov
- Editor: Elena Apreleva; Nikolai Skvortsov; Vasily Sobolevsky
- Founded: 1863
- Ceased publication: 15 March 1918
- Headquarters: Saint Petersburg, Russian Empire

Russkiye Vedomosti (Russian: Русские ведомости) was a Russian liberal daily newspaper, published in Moscow from 1863 till 1918.

Founded in Moscow in 1863 by Nikolai Pavlov, it was edited by Nikolai Skvortsov (1866-1882) and by Vasily Sobolevsky, in 1882–1912. After Sobolevsky's death in 1912, it became the organ of the Right-Wing Kadets. Following the October Revolution it was suppressed by the Bolsheviks in March 1918, for publishing the article by Boris Savinkov called "On Arrival" (С дороги). For it, its last editor P.V. Egorov had to spend three months in jail.
