= Ignaty Potapenko =

Russian writer and playwright (1856–1929)

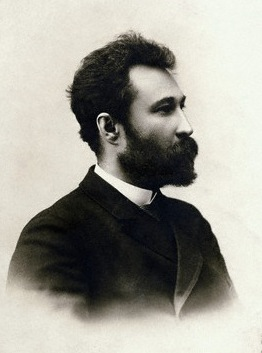
- Born: December 30, 1856; Fyodorovka, Kherson Governorate, Russian Empire (now Ukraine)
- Died: May 17, 1929 (aged 72); Leningrad, Soviet Union

Ignaty Nikolayevich Potapenko (Russian: Игна́тий Никола́евич Пота́пенко, December 30, 1856 – May 17, 1929), was a Russian writer and playwright.

== Biography ==
Potapenko was born in the village of Fyodorovka, Kherson Governorate, Russian Empire (now Ukraine) where his father was a priest. Potapenko studied at Odessa University, and at the Saint Petersburg Conservatory. His first works were tales of Ukrainian life. He's best known for his novel A Russian Priest (1890), published in Vestnik Evropy (Herald of Europe). His works include novels, plays, and short stories.

== English translations ==
- The General's Daughter, (novel), T. Fisher Unwin, 1892.
- A Father of Six, and An Occasional Holiday, (short novels), T. Fisher Unwin, 1893. from Archive.org
- A Thousand Talents, (story), from Anthology of Russian Literature, Volume 2, Leo Wiener, G. P. Putnam's Sons, 1903. from Archive.org
- The Curse of Fame, (story), from Short Story Classics (Foreign) Volume 1, P.F. Collier, 1907. from Archive.org
- What Dmitro Saw At the War, (story), from The Soul of Russia, W. Stephens, Macmillan and Co. LTD, London, 1916. from Archive.org
- A Russian Priest, (novel), T. Fisher Unwin, 1916. from Archive.org
- Dethroned, (story), from Best Russian Short Stories, Boni and Liveright, 1917. from Archive.org
