= About Love (short story) =

1898 short story by Anton Chekhov

- Short story by Anton Chekhov
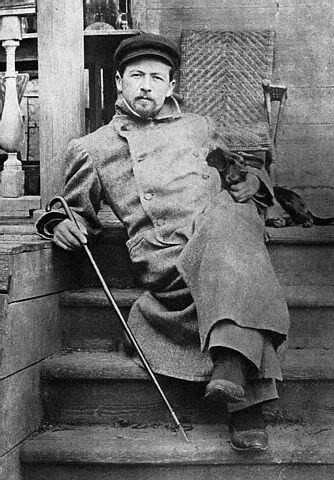
- Chekhov in Melikhovo, in 1897
- Original title: О любви
- Country: Russia
- Language: Russian

Publication
- Published in: Russkaya Mysl (1898)
- Publisher: Adolf Marks (1903)
- Publication date: August 1898

"About Love" (Russian: О любви, romanized: O lyubvi) is an 1898 short story by Anton Pavlovich Chekhov. The third and final part of the Little Trilogy, started by "The Man in the Case" and continued by "Gooseberries". It was first published in the August 1898 (No. 8) issue of Russkaya Mysl, and later included into Volume XII of the second, 1903 edition of the Collected Works by A.P. Chekhov, published by Adolf Marks.

== Background ==
There were numerous entries in Chekhov's notebooks related to the story, the earliest of them going back to as far as 1895, long before the story was apparently conceived. He wrote the story in June and July 1898, while staying at his country house in Melikhovo. It was supposed to be sent to Russkaya Mysl for this magazine's August issue along with "Gooseberries", and in the notebooks the two plotlines are often intertwined.

The story begins with the love affair between the cook of the house, Nikanor and servant (beautiful woman) Pelageya. Nikanor, who is a drunkard, often verbally abuses and even beats his lover Pelageya when he is drunk. So Pelageya only wants to live with him without getting married. On the other hand, Nikanor doesn’t want to be with her without getting married.

Originally Chekhov was not going to end the cycle with "About Love" and hoped to write at least one more story for it. But by the end of July the mental strain started to take its toll, and feelings of tiredness and dissatisfaction had overcome him. "I am sick of writing and do not know what to do," he confessed in the 27 July letter to Lydia Avilova. The same feelings were expressed in his 30 July letter to brother Alexander.

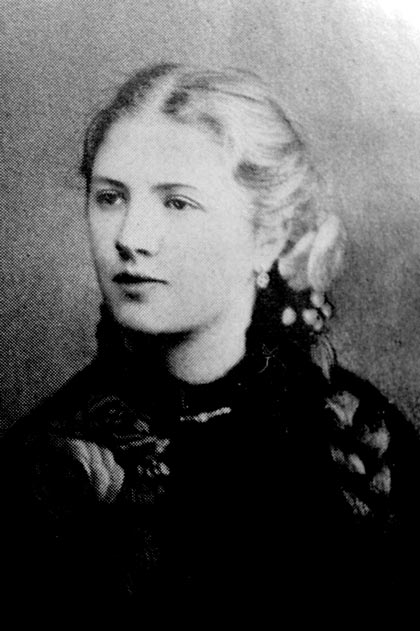
Lydia Avilova (1864-1943) claimed in her memoirs that in "About Love" Chekhov told about their own secret relationship that lasted ten years.

In a matter of days things got back to normal, but next month he had to go to Crimea for health reasons. "I feel like a fish out of water and all but stopped working. This imposed idleness and the resorts-visiting is worse than any bacilli," he complained in the 21 September letter to the Mayor of Taganrog (and his one-time classmate) Pavel Yordanov whom at the time he regularly corresponded with.

In November he resumed working, although not on the cycle, but on the two stories, "A Doctor's Visit" and "On Official Duty", unrelated to it. "Is there a chance you'd return to those stories, narrated by Ivan Ivanovich and Burkin?" Viktor Goltsev enquired in a December 1898 letter. Whether he received an answer or not, is unknown, but nothing else followed, and a proposed cycle remained but a "little trilogy".

Lydia Avilova, Chekhov's protégé and regular correspondent, who first met him in 1889, insisted that the "About Love" told the story of the secret relationship she'd had with its author. Her whole book of memoirs, A.P. Chekhov in My Life (А. П. Чехов в моей жизни, finished in 1939, published posthumously, in 1947), was based upon the premise that the two "had had a secret love affair which lasted a decade and nobody was aware of." She claimed that they discussed the story in their correspondence, and Chekhov even signed one of his letters "Alyuokhin". If there was such a letter, it failed to survive.

Avilova's memoirs caused controversy. Maria Chekhova was among those who expressed strong reservations. "These memoirs are lively and exciting, and many of the things she states in them are undoubtedly true... Lydia Alexeyevna seems to be totally truthful, when she writes about her own feelings to Anton Pavlovich... When it comes to his own feeling towards her, things start to look a bit too 'subjective'," she wrote in her book From Distant Past.

Ivan Bunin never doubted that Avilova's claims were true. He wrote: "Avilova's memories, brilliant, highly emotional, written masterfully and with great tact, became a revelation to me. I knew well Lydia Alexeyevna, a gifted woman with a rare sense of humour, who was also a very honest and shy person... Never did I suspect though, that they had this sort of relationship."

== Plot summary ==
The narrative takes up where "Gooseberries" left off. Prompted by the story of the cook Nikanor, a violent character and a drunkard, whom a nice and beautiful woman called Pelageya is in love with, Alyokhin starts to relate to his companions Burkin and Ivan Ivanovich the story of his own unhappy love.

...Upon leaving the university, he settles in the estate that he'd inherited from his father, and starts working hard so as to pay his debts. He gets elected an honorary justice of the peace and starts to go to the town often, enjoying fine, intelligent company. One of his new acquaintances, Dmitry Luganovitch, vice-president of the circuit court, described as a good-natured, simple-hearted middle-aged man, invites him home for dinner. There he meets Luganovich's young wife Anna Alekseyevna, a beautiful, charming and intelligent woman.

Soon Alyokhin discovers that he cannot get her out of his mind, then starts to realize that his feelings are reciprocated. He becomes a regular visitor in the house where he is admired both by the adults and the children. The Luganovichs are very kind to him, offering help and the money, which he is much in need of, but never takes from them.

He and Anna Alekseyevna often meet, go to the theatre together, but never speak about their feelings. Even if quite obsessed with her, Alyokhin realizes that there is not much that he can give her, and is horrified by the possibility of destroying this nice family. She is apparently reasoning in the same way: fancies she is not young enough for him, tied up with the feelings of responsibility for her two children.

As the years pass by, Anna Alexeyevna starts to suffer from low spirits, becomes irritable, and starts to receive treatment for neurasthenia. Alyokhin too is depressed and downtrodden in his helplessness. Eventually, Dmitry Luganovich receives the appointment as court chairman to one of Russia's western provinces. Anna Alekseyevna sets for the Crimea, on the advice of her doctor. A crowd of relatives and acquaintances comes to the station to see her off, Alyokhin among them. Finally, in the wagon both break down and confess their love to each other. The train takes off, and they part forever.

When one is in love, one has to get beyond the banal, rational reasoning and start to value love for its own sake, is the moral the narrator arrives at.

== Critical reception ==
"About Love" was widely discussed by the contemporary Russian critics, but mostly in the context of the whole three-story cycle. The in-depth analysis came from Alexander Skabichevsky in Syn Otechestva and Angel Bogdanovich in the October 1898 issue of Mir Bozhy, the latter seeing the story "as a kind of setting for the environment where the Man in the Case rules." Equally detailed but less complimentary analysis came from Birzhevye Vedomosti and the critic Alexander Izmaylov, who saw the story as another symptom of the author submerging deeper and deeper into melancholy and misery.
