= Grace Human =

English socialist

Grace Human (née Black, 1863–1934) was an English socialist and portrait artist.

== Biography ==
Human was born in 1863. Her father was the solicitor, town clerk and coroner David Black (1817–1892) of Brighton, son of a naval architect to Czar Nicholas I of Russia. Her mother was Clara Maria Patten (1825–1875), daughter of portrait and history painter George Patten (1801–1865). Her father became paralysed in 1873, and two years later in 1875 her mother died from a heart attack after lifting him from his chair to his bed. After this, she was educated and raised by her eldest sister, Constance.

Human was one of eight children and among her siblings were the mathematician Arthur Black (1851–1893), Russian literature translator Constance Garnett (1861–1946), labour organiser and novelist Clementina Black (1853–1922), and painter Emma Black.

Human was part of the social circle of George Bernard Shaw, and married the socialist engineer Edwin Human. In 1895, she travelled to Ceylon with her husband and became interested in theosophy.

As an artist, Human sketched portraits of activist Eleanor Marx, and social worker Nellie Benson.

She died in 1934.
