= Gooseberries (short story) =

1898 short story by Anton Chekhov

- Short story by Anton Chekhov
- 1954 illustration by T. Shishmaryova
- Original title: Крыжовник
- Country: Russia
- Language: Russian

Publication
- Published in: Russkaya Mysl (1898)
- Publisher: Adolf Marks (1903)
- Publication date: August 1898

"Gooseberries" (Russian: Крыжовник, romanized: Kryzhovnik) is an 1898 short story by Anton Chekhov, the second one in what has later become known as 'The Little Trilogy', along with "The Man in the Case" and "About Love".

== Publication ==
Written in Melikhovo in mid-1898, the story was sent to Russkaya Mysl on 28 July of that year and was first published in this magazine's No.8, August issue. In a slightly revised version it was included into Volume 12 of the 1903, second edition of the Collected Works by A.P. Chekhov, and then into Volume 11 of the third, posthumous 1906 edition.

Chekhov himself asked the publisher Adolf Marks not to include this story (as well as "The Man in a Case" and "About Love") into the Collected Works' first, 1901 edition. On 29 September 1899 he wrote to Marks: "The Man in a Case, Gooseberries and About Love belong to one cycle which has not been finished yet, so they might appear only in the volumes 11 or 12, when the whole set would have been completed." But the intended vast cycle remained unfinished.

== Background ==
There are entries in Chekhov's notebooks that suggest there was a long history behind "Gooseberries". Originally he intended to end the story with the main character falling ill and dying in bitter disillusionment after having had all his ambitions fulfilled. Gradually the psychological portrait of Nikolai Ivanovich became more satirical and complicated. He became a rather conceited, self-satisfied person who seems not to see how his views and ideals have changed in the process of what he considers as social 'progress'. According to Mikhail Chekhov's 1923 memoirs there were numerous details in the story pointing to the village Bakumovka and the estate of the local landlord Smagin, where the author had guested.

He also explained the origins of the surname Chimsha-Gimalaysky. According to Mikhail Chekhov, "Once in Siberia, while he was on his way to Sakhalin... a local man came up to him, wishing to introduce himself and produced a visiting card with the surname: Rymsha-Pilsudsky." Chekhov found it extremely funny, kept the card and later promised to somehow make the use of this unusual name.

== Plot summary ==
Ivan Ivanovich Chimsha-Gimalayski, a veterinary surgeon, tells the story of his younger brother Nikolai Ivanovich. An official at the Exchequer Court, the latter became obsessed with the idea of returning to the country where he and his brother had spent their happy childhood. The symbol of this fantasies for some reason, became a gooseberry bush. Finally his dream came true. He bought himself a farm and became a landowner. Ivan Ivanovich tells how he visited Nikolai, and how depressing it was for him to see this apparently happy man, now fat and flabby, living in what he imagined to be his earthly paradise, referring to himself as 'we, noblemen' and experiencing sheer delight which brings tears to his eyes, when his cook, as fat and pig-like as he is, delivers him a plateful of gooseberries. All this makes Ivan Ivanovich think about the nature of human happiness, which for him is very much the result of any happy man's unawareness of how much grief and pain is there behind the walls of the narrow world he'd built for himself.

=== Quote ===
"And such a state of things is evidently necessary; obviously the happy man is at ease only because the unhappy ones bear their burdens in silence, and if there were not this silence, happiness would be impossible. It is a general hypnosis. Behind the door of every contented, happy man there ought to be someone standing with a little hammer and continually reminding him with a knock that there are unhappy people, that however happy he may be, life will sooner or later show him its claws, and trouble will come to him-illness, poverty, losses, and then no one will see or hear him, just as now he neither sees nor hears others. But there is no man with a hammer. The happy man lives at his ease, faintly fluttered by small daily cares, like an aspen in the wind-and all is well." — Ivan Ivanovich

== Reception ==
The story was much discussed by the contemporary critics and garnered mostly positive reviews. The in-depth analysis were provided by Alexander Skabichevsky in Syn Otechestva and Angel Bogdanovich in the October 1898 issue of Mir Bozhy, the latter describing the story "as a kind of setting for the environment where the Man in a Case rules". "Nikolai Ivanovich is a perfect representative of the very same world where [Belikov] for fifteen years has been exterminating in himself all those things that rise a man over the lowest, base level of meaningless existence," Bogdanovich argued.

Equally detailed but less complimentary analysis came from Birzhevye Vedomosti and the critic Alexander Izmaylov who saw the story as another symptom of the author submerging still deeper into melancholy and misery.
