= Gertrude Massingham =

British suffragette

- Born: Gertrude Speedwell Black; 1887
- Died: 1963 (aged 75–76)
- Political party: Labour
- Spouse: H. J. Massingham
- Father: Arthur Black
- Relatives: Clementina Black (aunt); Grace Human (aunt); Constance Garnett (aunt); Emma Black (aunt)

Gertrude Speedwell Massingham (née Black; 1887–1963) was a British suffragette and animal welfare advocate. She was an activist for women and animal welfare in the United Kingdom and stood for parliament twice.

== Biography ==
Massingham was the daughter of the mathematician Arthur Black. In 1893, her father murdered her mother and brother before committing suicide. As a result she moved into the home of her aunt Clementina Black. She was married to the writer H. J. Massingham, son of author Henry William Massingham.

Massingham was described as a pioneer for women's rights. As a member of the Women's Social and Political Union, she was released from prison on 10 August 1914 under amnesty at the outbreak of the First World War. In 1924 she employed by the RSPCA. She was the first public affairs officer for the RSPCA. She was also active in politics. She was the prospective parliamentary candidate for the Labour Party in Petersfield in 1929 and Maidstone in 1931.

In 2024, the RSPCA dedicated an award in her name for the organisations 200th anniversary.
