= Constance Garnett =

English writer and translator (1861–1946)

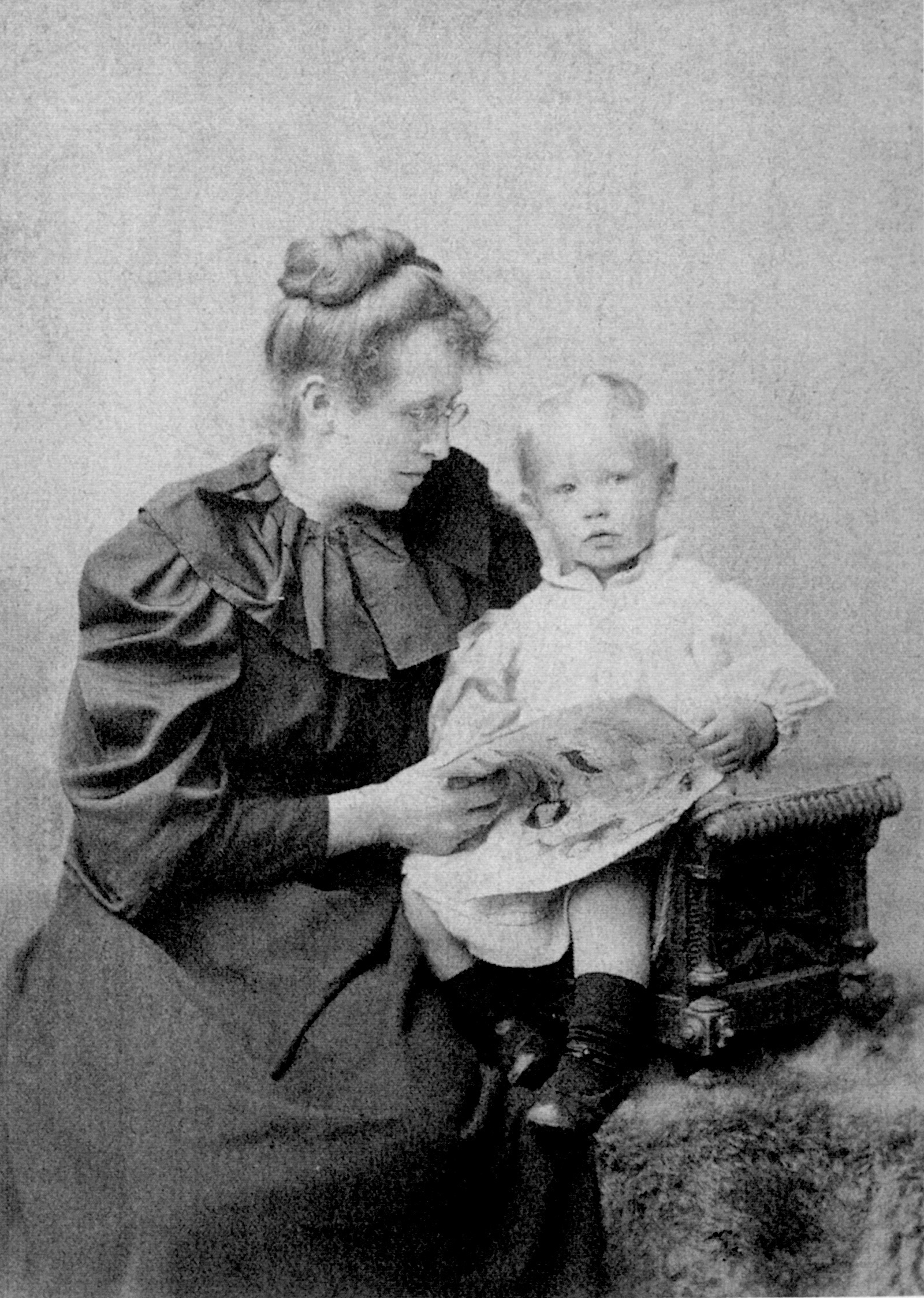
- Garnett with her son David, mid-1890s
- Born: Constance Clara Black; 19 December 1861; Brighton, England
- Died: 17 December 1946 (aged 84); The Cearne, Crockham Hill, Kent, England
- Education: Brighton and Hove High School; Newnham College, Cambridge
- Occupations: Writer; translator
- Spouse: Edward Garnett (m. 1889; died 1937)
- Children: David Garnett
- Relatives: George Patten (grandfather)

Constance Clara Garnett (née Black; 19 December 1861 – 17 December 1946) was an English writer and translator of nineteenth-century Russian literature. She was the first English translator to render numerous volumes of Anton Chekhov's work into English and the first to translate almost all of Fyodor Dostoevsky's fiction into English. She also rendered works by Ivan Turgenev, Leo Tolstoy, Nikolai Gogol, Ivan Goncharov, Alexander Ostrovsky, and Alexander Herzen into English. Altogether, Garnett translated 71 volumes of Russian literature, many of which are still in print today.

== Life ==
Garnett was born in Brighton, England, the sixth of the eight children of the solicitor David Black (1817–1892), afterwards town clerk and coroner, and his wife, Clara Maria Patten (1825–1875), daughter of painter George Patten. Her brother was the mathematician Arthur Black, and her sister was the labour organiser and novelist Clementina Black. Her father became paralysed in 1873, and two years later, her mother died from a heart attack after lifting him from his chair to his bed.

She was initially educated at Brighton and Hove High School. Afterwards she studied Latin and Greek at Newnham College, Cambridge, on a government scholarship. In 1883, she moved to London, where she started work as a governess, and then as the librarian at the People's Palace Library. Through her sister, Clementina, she met Dr. Richard Garnett, then the Keeper of Printed Materials at the British Museum, and his son Edward Garnett, whom she married in Brighton on 31 August 1889. Edward, after working as a publisher's reader for T. Fisher Unwin, William Heinemann, and Duckworth, went on to become a reader for the publisher Jonathan Cape.

In the summer of 1891, then pregnant with her only child, Garnett was introduced by Edward to the Russian exile Feliks Volkhovsky, who began teaching her Russian. He also introduced her to his fellow exile and colleague Sergius Stepniak and his wife Fanny. Soon afterwards, Garnett began working with Stepniak, translating Russian works for publication; her first published translations were A Common Story by Ivan Goncharov, and The Kingdom of God is Within You by Leo Tolstoy. The latter was published while she was making her first trip to Russia in early 1894. After visits to Moscow and Saint Petersburg, she travelled to Yasnaya Polyana where she met Tolstoy; although the latter expressed interest in having her translate more of his religious works, she had already begun working on the novels of Turgenev and continued with that on her return home. Initially she worked with Stepniak on her translations; after his untimely death in 1895, Stepniak's wife Fanny worked with her. From 1906, her favourite amanuensis was a young Russian woman, Natalie Duddington whom she had met in Russia and in whom she found "real intellectual companionship".

Over the next four decades, Garnett produced English-language versions of dozens of volumes by Tolstoy, Gogol, Goncharov, Dostoevsky, Turgenev, Ostrovsky, Herzen and Chekhov.

She played a critical role in translating Tolstoy's Anna Karenina (1901) and War and Peace (1904), which were well received. Fellow writer and translator Isabel Florence Hapgood translated Tolstoy's Childhood, Boyhood, Youth (1886), and Sevastopol (1888), thereby helping to complete the Tolstoy opus. Additionally, Garnett translated Dostoevsky's The Brothers Karamazov (1912) and Crime and Punishment (1914). Her translations expanded the popularity of the novels to the English-speaking world and even overshadowed Hapgood's first translation of The Brothers Karamazov (1905).

Her son and only child, David Garnett, trained as a biologist and later wrote novels, including the popular Lady into Fox (1922).

By the late 1920s, Garnett was frail and half-blind. She retired from translating after the publication in 1934 of Three Plays by Turgenev. After her husband's death in 1937, she became reclusive. She developed a heart condition, with attendant breathlessness, and in her last years had to walk with crutches. She died at The Cearne, Crockham Hill, Kent, at the age of 84.

== Reception and legacy ==
Constance Garnett translated 71 volumes of Russian literary works, and her translations received acclaim from numerous critics and authors, including Joseph Conrad and D. H. Lawrence. Ernest Hemingway admired her translations of Fyodor Dostoevsky and once told a friend that he was unable to read through Leo Tolstoy's War and Peace "until I got the Constance Garnett translation." Despite some complaints about being outdated, her translations are still being reprinted today. (All are now in the public domain in the United States with the exception of her translation of Turgenev's Three Plays, which was published in 1934. As of 2026, all works published before 1931 are in the public domain in the United States.)

However, Garnett also has had critics, notably Russian authors Vladimir Nabokov and Joseph Brodsky. Nabokov said that Garnett's translations were "dry and flat, and always unbearably demure." Commenting on a letter of Joseph Conrad to Edward Garnett, in which Conrad had written that "[Constance's] translation of Karenina is splendid. Of the thing itself [i.e. Anna Karenina] I think but little, so that her merit shines with the greater luster", Nabokov wrote "I shall never forgive Conrad this crack. Actually the Garnett translation is very poor". (Nabokov's criticism of Garnett, however, should be viewed in light of his publicly stated ideal that the translator must be male.) Brodsky criticised Garnett for blurring the distinctive authorial voices of different Russian authors:

The reason English-speaking readers can barely tell the difference between Tolstoy and Dostoevsky is that they aren't reading the prose of either one. They're reading Constance Garnett.

Ronald Hingley criticized Garnett's translations of colloquial speech in Chekhov's stories, stating: "These are not very convincing samples of country speech ... or of a Russian village in the 1890s."

David Foster Wallace criticized Garnett's translations as 'excruciatingly Victorianish'.

In her translations, she worked quickly, and smoothed over certain small portions for "readability", particularly in her translations of Dostoevsky.

Her translations of Ivan Turgenev and Anton Chekhov were well regarded by Rachel May in her study on translating Russian classics, The Translator in the Text: On Reading Russian Literature in English. However, May's study also critiqued Garnett for her tendency of "stylistic homogenizing" that "eras[ed] those idiosyncrasies of narrative voice and dialogue that different authors possessed" and for making prudish word choices that "tamed [the Russian classics] further." May also analyzed how for decades, Garnett's translations were unquestioningly acclaimed by critics because "she suited the needs of her time so well, that no one knew what questions to ask."

Kornei Chukovsky respected Garnett for introducing millions of English readers to Russian literature, and praised her translations of Turgenev, stating that they "fully correspond to the originals in tonality", but condemned her other translations, writing that she had reduced Dostoevsky's style into "a safe blandscript: not a volcano, but a smooth lawn mowed in the English manner—which is to say a complete distortion of the original", and that the same criticisms applied to her translation of Tolstoy's The Death of Ivan Ilyich. He concluded that:

[H]er translations of the works of Gogol, Dostoevsky, and Chekhov have to be done over. All of her translations seem insipid, pale, and—worst of all—trivial ... [H]er translations would have been considerably better if they had been submitted at the time to the intense scrutiny of critics ... But there was no criticism

In 1994, Donald Rayfield compared Garnett's translations with the most recent scholarly versions of Chekhov's stories and concluded:

While she makes elementary blunders, her care in unravelling difficult syntactical knots and her research on the right terms for Chekhov's many plants, birds and fish are impressive ... Her English is not only nearly contemporaneous to Chekhov's, it is often comparable.

Later translators such as Rosemary Edmonds and David Magarshack continued to use Garnett's translations as models for their own work.

For his Norton Critical Edition of The Brothers Karamazov, Ralph Matlaw based his revised version on her translation. This is the basis for the influential A Karamazov Companion by Victor Terras. Matlaw published an earlier revision of Garnett's translation of the Grand Inquisitor chapter in a volume paired with Notes from Underground.

== Selected bibliography ==
=== Translations credited to Garnett ===
==== Anton Chekhov (originally transliterated as "Anton Tchehov") ====
- The Darling and Other Stories, London: Chatto & Windus (1916)
  - The Darling
  - Critique of The Darling by Leo Tolstoy
  - Ariadne
  - Polinka
  - Anyuta
  - The Two Volodyas
  - The Trousseau
  - The Helpmate
  - Talent
  - An Artist's Story
  - Three Years
- The Duel and Other Stories, London: Chatto & Windus (1916)
  - The Duel
  - Excellent People
  - Mire
  - Neighbours
  - At Home
  - Expensive Lessons
  - The Princess
  - The Chemist's Wife
- The Lady with the Dog and Other Stories, London: Chatto & Windus (1917)
  - The Lady with the Dog
  - A Doctor's Visit
  - An Upheaval
  - Ionitch
  - The Head of the Family
  - The Black Monk
  - Volodya
  - An Anonymous Story
  - The Husband
- The Party and Other Stories, London: Chatto & Windus (1917)
  - The Party
  - Terror
  - A Woman's Kingdom
  - A Problem
  - The Kiss
  - Anna on the Neck
  - The Teacher of Literature
  - Not Wanted
  - Typhus
  - A Misfortune
  - A Trifle from Life
- The Wife and Other Stories, London: Chatto & Windus (1918)
  - The Wife
  - Difficult People
  - The Grasshopper
  - A Dreary Story
  - The Privy Councillor
  - The Man in a Case
  - Gooseberries
  - About Love
  - The Lottery Ticket
- The Witch and Other Stories, London: Chatto & Windus (1918)
  - The Witch
  - Peasant Wives
  - The Post
  - The New Villa
  - Dreams
  - The Pipe
  - Agafya
  - At Christmas Time
  - Gusev
  - The Student
  - In the Ravine
  - The Huntsman
  - Happiness
  - A Malefactor
  - Peasants
- The Bishop and Other Stories, London: Chatto & Windus (1919)
  - The Bishop
  - The Letter
  - Easter Eve
  - A Nightmare
  - The Murder
  - The Steppe
- The Chorus Girl and Other Stories, London: Chatto & Windus (1920)
  - The Chorus Girl
  - Verotchka
  - My Life
  - At a Country House
  - A Father
  - On the Road
  - Rothschild's Fiddle
  - Ivan Matveyitch
  - Zinotchka
  - Bad Weather
  - A Gentleman Friend
  - A Trivial Incident
- Letters of Anton Tchehov to his Family and Friends, London: Chatto & Windus (1920)
- The Cherry Orchard and Other Plays, London: Chatto & Windus (1923)
  - The Cherry Orchard
  - Uncle Vanya
  - The Sea-Gull
  - The Bear
  - The Proposal
- Three Sisters and Other Plays, London: Chatto & Windus (1923)
  - Three Sisters
  - Ivanov
  - A Swan-Song
  - An Unwilling Martyr
  - The Anniversary
  - On the High Road
  - The Wedding

==== Fyodor Dostoevsky ====
- The Brothers Karamazov, London: Heinemann (1912)
- The Idiot, London: Heinemann (1913)
- The Possessed, London: Heinemann (1913; revised to incorporate "Stavrogin's Confession" [the censored chapter "At Tikhon's"], 1923)
- Crime and Punishment, London: Heinemann (1914)
- The Gambler and Other Stories, London: Heinemann (1914)
  - The Gambler
  - Poor People
  - The Landlady
- The House of the Dead, London: Heinemann (1915)
- The Insulted and Injured, London: Heinemann (1915)
- A Raw Youth, London: Heinemann (1916)
- The Eternal Husband and Other Stories, London: Heinemann (1917)
  - The Eternal Husband
  - The Double
  - A Gentle Spirit
- White Nights and Other Stories, London: Heinemann (1918)
  - White Nights
  - Notes from Underground
  - A Faint Heart
  - A Christmas Tree and a Wedding
  - Polzunkov
  - A Little Hero
  - Mr. Prohartchin
- An Honest Thief and Other Stories, London: Heinemann (1919)
  - An Honest Thief
  - Uncle's Dream
  - A Novel in Nine Letters
  - An Unpleasant Predicament
  - Another Man's Wife
  - The Heavenly Christmas Tree
  - The Peasant Marey
  - The Crocodile
  - Bobok
  - The Dream of a Ridiculous Man
- The Friend of the Family; or, Stepanchikovo and Its Inhabitants and Another Story, London: Heinemann (1920)
  - The Friend of the Family
  - Nyetochka Nyezvanov

==== Nikolai Gogol ====
- Dead Souls, London: Chatto & Windus (1922)
- The Overcoat and Other Stories, London: Chatto & Windus (1923)
  - The Overcoat
  - The Carriage
  - The Nevsky Prospect
  - A Madman's Diary
  - The Prisoner
  - The Nose
  - The Portrait
- Evenings on a Farm Near Dikanka, London: Chatto & Windus (1926)
- The Government Inspector and Other Plays, London: Chatto & Windus (1926)
  - The Government Inspector
  - Marriage
  - The Gamblers
  - An Official's Morning
  - A Lawsuit
  - The Servant's Hall
  - A Fragment
- Mirgorod, London: Chatto & Windus (1928)

==== Ivan Goncharov ====
- A Common Story, London: Heinemann (1894)

==== Alexander Herzen ====
- My Past and Thoughts: The Memoirs of Alexander Herzen, London: Chatto & Windus (published in six volumes; 1924–1927)

==== Alexander Ostrovsky ====
- The Storm, London: Duckworth (1899)

==== Leo Tolstoy ====
- The Kingdom of God Is Within You, London: Heinemann (1894)
- Anna Karenina (1901)
- The Death of Ivan Ilyitch and Other Stories (1902)
  - The Death of Ivan Ilyitch
  - Family Happiness
  - Polikushka
  - Two Hussars
  - The Snowstorm
  - Three Deaths
- War and Peace, London: Heinemann (1904)

==== Ivan Turgenev ====
- A Nest of Gentlefolk, London: Heinemann (1894)
- Rudin, London: Heinemann (1894)
- The Diary of a Superfluous Man and Other Stories, London: Heinemann (1894)
  - The Diary of a Superfluous Man
  - A Tour in the Forest
  - Yakov Pasinkov
  - Andrei Kolosov
  - A Correspondence
- A Sportsman's Sketches, London: Heinemann (1895)
- Fathers and Children, London: Heinemann (1895)
- On the Eve, London: Heinemann (1895)
- Smoke, London: Heinemann (1896)
- Virgin Soil, London: Heinemann (1896)
- Torrents of Spring, London: Heinemann (1897)
- A Desperate Character and Other Stories London: Heinemann (1899)
  - A Desperate Character
  - A Strange Story
  - Punin and Baburin
  - Old Portraits
  - The Brigadier
  - Pyetushkov
- The Jew and Other Stories, London: Heinemann (1899)
  - The Jew
  - An Unhappy Girl
  - The Duellist
  - Three Portraits
  - Enough
- Three Plays, London: Cassell & Company (1934)
  - A Month in the Country
  - A Provincial Lady
  - A Poor Gentleman

== See also ==
- Ann Dunnigan
