= The Student (short story) =

Story by Anton Chekhov

- Short story by Anton Chekhov
- Original title: Студент
- Country: Russia
- Language: Russian
- Genre(s): Short story

Publication
- Published in: Russkie Vedomosti
- Publication date: April 16, 1894 (Note: Bogdanova (2019) gives the initial publication date as April 15, 1894.)
- Published in English: 1918

"The Student" (Russian: "Студент", romanized: Student) is a short story by Anton Chekhov first published on April 16, 1894, in the newspaper Russkie Vedomosti. It tells of a clerical student returning home on a cold Good Friday evening who stops at a fire and meets two widows. He recounts to them the canonical Gospels' story of the Denial of Peter and upon finishing, notes that these two women are deeply moved, leading him to conclude that all of history is connected through truth and beauty.

At four pages, "The Student" is one of Chekhov's shortest stories and was the one he identified as his favorite among his own works. Critics have disagreed about whether the protagonist's point of view at the end of the story coincides with Chekhov's perspective. Other critical interpretation has focused on the symmetrical structure of "The Student" as well as the significance of the language used both to tell the story of the Denial of Peter and to tell the story as a whole. "The Student" has been praised by critics for its compactness and delicacy.

== Plot ==
A recording of Constance Garnett's translation of "The Student" (09:56)

On a Good Friday evening, Ivan Velikopolsky, a 22-year-old sacristan's son and clerical student, walks home and imagines that the bitter wind, cold, and darkness he experiences were also felt throughout history: by Rurik, Ivan the Terrible, and Peter the Great. Along his path, he meets Vasilisa and Lukerya, a mother and her daughter who have both been widowed. As he joins them around their fire, Ivan remarks that the warmth they feel must also have been felt by Saint Peter. Suddenly, he asks if the widows have been reading the Twelve Passion Gospels to which Vasilisa replies that they have.

Ivan begins to recount the story of the Denial of Peter, in which Jesus foretells to Saint Peter that he will thrice deny Him before the next crowing of the cock. Peter follows Jesus upon His arrest and joins some workers in the yard standing around a fire as He is questioned. Thrice the workers suspiciously ask Peter if he knows Jesus and thrice he denies his acquaintance. A cock crows and Peter, realizing what he has done, weeps.

Ivan ends his story deep in thought as Vasilisa begins to cry and Lukerya looks on in pain. He parts with the widows and continues homeward, thinking that his story troubled Lukerya and made Vasilisa weep not because he told it well but because the tale was relevant to them nineteen centuries later. As he rides the ferry to his village, Ivan comes to believe that truth and beauty serve as the connectors of all human history and he is filled with joy and awe at life itself.

== Publication ==
Dealing with a strong cough, Anton Chekhov wrote "The Student" while on a monthlong vacation to Yalta, a city he found to be "ever so boring". The story, which initially bore the title "In the Evening", was published in issue number 104 of the newspaper Russkie Vedomosti (The Russian News) (Note: Russkie Vedomosti may also be translated as Russian Gazette.) on April 16, 1894, and, at just four pages long, was one of Chekhov's shortest stories. Later in 1894, "The Student" was republished in the collection Novellas and Stories (Povesti i rasskazyi). For this edition, Chekhov clarified why Vasilisa wept, heightened Ivan's reaction to the dark and cold near the story's beginning, and made clearer the connection between truth, beauty, and human history. While editing the text, Chekhov extended rather than curtailed it, which was a rarity for the author.

Chekhov relayed to Ivan Bunin that "The Student" was his favorite among his own short stories. According to L. M. O'Toole, it was also the story "that [Chekhov] considered to be structurally most perfect" among his oeuvre. Chekhov referenced it as a counterexample when challenged that his works were overtly pessimistic, describing it to his brother Alexander as his "manifesto for optimism".

Chekhov included the story in the eighth volume of his collected works published by Adolf Marks in 1899–1901. "The Student" received an English translation by Constance Garnett in 1918 when it was published in the Tales of Chekhov series in the volume The Witch, and Other Stories.

== Analysis ==
Chekhov's contemporaries believed Ivan's epiphany in the end of "The Student" represented a "conversion" for the agnostic author himself. This was echoed a century later when metropolitan bishop Veniamin (Fedchenkov) wrote, "nowhere does Chekhov write ill about the Orthodox clergy". According to Veniamin, the effect of "The Student" is indescribably moving, even to nonbelievers. Andrey Shcherbenok wrote that Ivan's reinvigoration with beauty and truth at the story's end has been viewed as "coincid[ing] with the authorial perspective" but that "The problem with this interpretation is that the narrative agency in 'The Student' is so fluid that it is difficult to separate the voice of the authorial narrator from that of a hero." Mark Stanley Swift commented that Veniamin's reading of the story "confuses the poignant portrayal of the faithful and the intimate depiction of religious experience for personal belief on the part of the author".

Cathy Popkin presented an alternative interpretation of the story's ending, writing that Ivan's epiphany may have instead been intended by Chekhov to be "a transitory result of [Ivan's] youthful impetuosity, a phase of no lasting significance". According to Olga Bogdanova, the character of Ivan was written with the work of Leo Tolstoy in mind, as Chekhov had long been interested in Tolstoy's ideas and morals but, by March 1894, had disavowed them, writing that "Tolstoy's morality has ceased to touch me". To this end, Bogdanova wrote that the revelation at the conclusion of "The Student" was often taken at face value by modern literary critics but that an intertextual reading of the story considering the influence of Tolstoy's works suggests that Ivan's revelation was speculative and naive. Robert Louis Jackson wrote that Chekhov may have changed the story's title from its first publication (when it was called "In the Evening") to its second "not simply because the story moves from darkness to light ... but because with respect to the essential lessons of life he believed that the human being is an eternal student, forever failing, forever drawing a deep spiritual breath, and forever restarting the journey".

Different aspects of the story within the story resonate with the student and the widows, according to David Weiss. For Ivan, "it's Peter's failure, his denials, his weakness that matter" while to Vasilisa and Lukerya, "it's the way he suffers for his failures, failure despite his good intentions, good intentions undone by fear and human weakness". Jackson wrote that Vasilisa and Lukerya are the story's true heroes, since "in the most essential terms of human experience they have kept the faith: theirs is the light of the biblical 'burning bush,' and they have kept the fires burning".

=== Structure and style ===
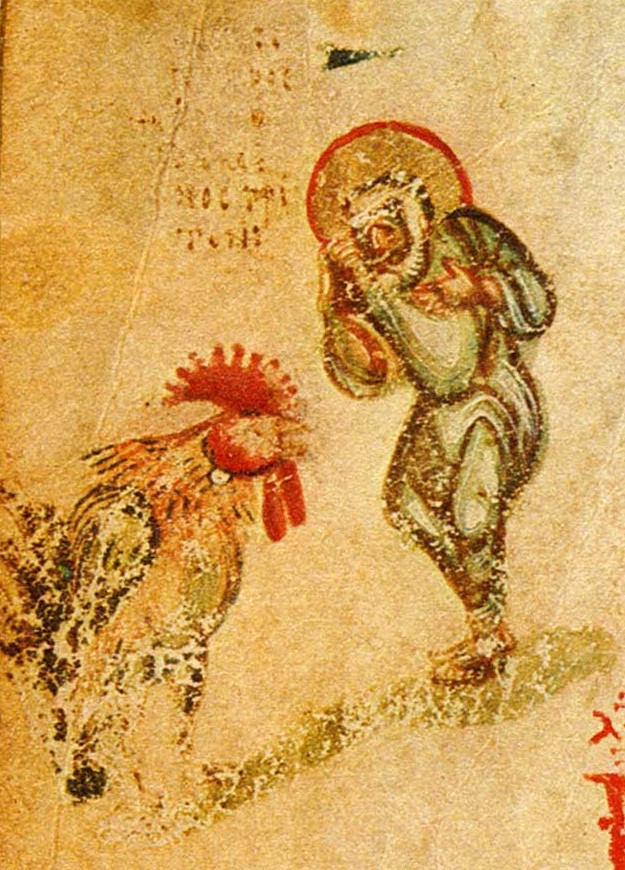
The Denial of Peter, from the 9th century Chludov Psalter

The structure of "The Student" follows a descent–ascent pattern mirroring that in Dante Alighieri's Inferno, according to Michael Finke: "The hero moves in spirit and space from cheerfulness in the thick woods before the onset of darkness, to despondency with the onset of night and bitter cold in a low, marshy place, and then to euphoria with the crossing of a river and ascent in space." Donald Rayfield described the story as having a "cyclic shape" in which "all the details of the scene are mirrored in the story of Peter's betrayal, which in turn is mirrored in the final page of narrative". Ivan begins to identify some of the similarities between his situation and that of Peter in his story, according to Jefferson Hunter, but he fails to recognize the extent to which his interactions with Vasilisa and Lukerya are a reenactment of the story of Peter. Hunter wrote that "Both Ivan and Peter are simultaneously self-centered and ignorant about themselves, the ignorance being symbolized in Peter's case by his repeated denials of his true identity and exemplified in Ivan's by his innocent joy at 'discovering' something his despair has already taught him: the sameness of human life over the ages."

L. S. K. le Fleming wrote that Chekhov used partially antonymous sets of words like "cold", "wind", and "blown" and "fire", "bonfire", and "heat" (Note: Respectively, the words mentioned by le Fleming are холод, ветер, дуть, огонь, костёр, and греть.) in a way that related them both to the condition of the student and that of the environment: at the story's outset, Ivan grapples with thoughts of suffering as cold winds blow, then gains newfound physical and spiritual warmth at the bonfire where he relates the biblical tale and, as he departs, the "glow of warmth in his soul is even reflected back onto the natural scene in a crimson glow which lingers in the sky from the sunset."

According to Rayfield, the language in "The Student" begins as "harsh and laconic", then becomes "rich and gentle" as the protagonist recounts his story, then mirrors in its rhythm the natures of characters after he is finished. Ivan's language, as described by Rayfield, is a mishmash of childlike repetition of adjectives and Church Slavonic, "mingling the past with the present in the very texture of the prose". Although the Denial of Peter is recounted in all four Canonical Gospels, Ivan's retelling calls specifically upon language from the Gospel of Luke, despite the absence of that Gospel's recounting of Peter's Denial among the Twelve Passion Gospels. Ivan favors the language from the Gospel of Luke, according to David W. Martin, because it is more dramatic than the language found in analogous portions of the Gospels of Matthew or John. Rayfield described the third-to-last paragraph as "a Tolstoyan series of syllogisms" that are clumsily constructed by Ivan who, in the final paragraph–a single flowing sentence of more than 100 words–rejects the cerebral syllogistic approach in favor of an emotional climax.

=== Themes ===
O'Toole wrote that the short story's theme is catharsis: "the power of tragedy to move and inspire". According to Tatiana Spektor, "The Student" exists as part of "the traditional Russian dialogue between religion and atheism" due to its exploration of philosophical questions by means of literary texts (here the Denial of Peter). Spektor wrote that the interdependence of all things (Note: Spektor specifically refers to the concept of sobor, the Russian version of catholicity or "the communion between the living and the dead which takes place among the saved and is the evidence that the dead have been resurrected and exist at a spiritual level.") is a major theme in "The Student", and Rayfield described the story as "a parable about art", a distinction which he believed fit few other of Chekhov's stories.

== Reception ==
According to Rayfield, "'The Student' is a perfect example in miniature of Chekhov's art, and it bridges the gap between the ecstatic mood of the ecclesiastical and steppe stories of 1886–7 and the lyricism of the prose of the 1900s." "'The Student' is only a few pages long, but it is a story of extraordinary economy, beauty, and power", wrote James N. Loehlin. He continued that the story "not only describes the power of narrative to evoke spiritual truth, it embodies it". Kerry McSweeney wrote that Ivan's revelation at the story's end may also provide a similar feeling of epiphany to the reader, writing that "What is central is the continuing power of Chekhov's artwork to establish connections–to forge new links in a living chain that is not vertical, timeless, and sacred but horizontal, temporal and secular."

== See also ==
- "Easter Eve", another Chekhov story taking place around Easter
