= On Official Duty =

- Short story by Anton Chekhov
- Original title: По делам службы
- Country: Russia
- Language: Russian

Publication
- Published in: Knizhki Nedeli (1899)
- Publisher: Adolf Marks (1903, 1906)
- Publication date: January 1899

"On Official Duty" (Russian: По делам службы, romanized: Po delam sluzhby) is an 1899 short story by Anton Chekhov.

== Publication ==
The story, sent to the editor on 26 November, was first published in the January 1899 issue of Books of the Week, the literary supplement to Nedelya. With some minor changes Chekhov included it into Volume 9 of the 1899–1901, first edition the Collected Works by A.P. Chekhov, published by Adolf Marks.

== Plot summary ==
Doctor Starchenko and Lyzhin, a young deputy examining magistrate, arrive at Syrnya to attend to the case of Lesnitsky, an insurance agent, who, upon arrival to the village three days before, entered the local zemstvo house, ordered himself a samovar, unpacked his food packets, and then all of as sudden shot himself. The suicide was so bizarre, that the inquest was deemed to be necessary.

Starchenko and Lyzhin spend some time at the house, discussing the possible reasons for this tragedy, as well as the way the whole phenomenon of suicide has turned into something ludicrously absurd during the last decades, while the dead body lies in the next room. The doctor then departs to spend the night at the house of Von Taunits, a local minor landlord. Staying in, the magistrate, to kill the time, talks with the local constable Loshadin, a pathetic, lost kind of soul. He is getting more and more depressed with the whole picture of the wilderness of the Russian province, next to which the two major cities, Moscow and St Petersburg, feel like another planet. Suddenly he remembers that he had once met Lesnitsky, at one of the zemstvo meetings, and the image of this good-looking, emotionally deeply troubled man, haunts him for a long time.

Later in the evening Starchenko returns to take Lyzhin to the Von Taunits'. Again the young man is shocked, now by the sharp contrast between this brightly lit, merry place where modern people dance, chat, play piano an enjoy fine food, apparently totally detached from the unfathomable secrets of the threatening outside world, there the blizzard rages... In bed, unable to sleep, he starts to form an idea. According to it, no matter how disjointed and absurd the picture of life in general seems to be, somewhere deep within it amounts to the compact whole, where details, closely united, constitute one single puzzle, in which any single event, no matter how unrelated to all others and alien to common sense as such it seems to be, profoundly affects the whole.

== Reception ==
The story was lauded by Ivan Gorbunov-Posadov who in a private (24 January 1899) letter informed the author also of Lev Tolstoy's ecstatic reaction to it. Also in a January letter Mikhail Menshikov, a Nedelya staff member, expressed his delight with the story and with its author's "magic gift of producing—out of the chaos of words—those very simple ones which, in their special combinations, like a stricken match, instantly lighten up the very essence of things". On the whole the press ignored the story, one exception being Angel Bogdanovich who, in his Mir Bozhy (No. 2, February 1899) review praised Chekhov for being in the forefront of the Russian literature, awakening the general readership to those aspects of life other authors were either blind to, or consciously ignored.
