= The Cattle-Dealers =

- Short story by Anton Chekhov
- 1938 illustration by P. Stroyev
- Original title: Холодная кровь
- Translator: Constance Garnett (original)
- Country: Russia
- Language: Russian

Publication
- Published in: Novoye Vremya
- Publisher: Adolf Marks, 1899-1901
- Publication date: 31 October, 3 November 1887 (old style)

"The Cattle-Dealers" (originally, "The Cold Blood", Russian: Холодная кровь, romanized: Kholodnaya krov) is an 1887 short story by Anton Chekhov.

== Background and publication history ==
The story was based upon Chekhov's journey to the Russian South in the spring of 1887. On 7 April of that year he wrote: "Woke up in Slavyansk... Here another campaign rages on... The Railways are being sued. The state controller claims that the Lozovo-Sevastopol Railway had stolen 300 wagons from the Azov Railway and painted them into its own colours." This detail was mentioned in the story.

According to Mikhail Chekhov, "...[The Cattle-Dealers] is another story belonging to the Taganrog cycle. Our uncle Mitrofan Yegorovich's wife Ludmila Pavlovna's brother, Andrey Pavlovich [Yevtushevsky], a very likeable man, after having failed as a Taganrog mayor's assistant, decided to retire and join the commerce. For all the money that he had, he bought the cattle, put it into the freight train and started out to Moscow to sell it for meat. On his way, inexperienced and unpractical, he was virtually robbed by the railway men, arrived at Moscow almost penniless and failed to hit the peak price time. Overcome with disappointment, he found Anton Pavlovich, related to him the tale of his misfortunes and corroborated his story with the documents... Anton Pavlovich used them for his story ‘Cold Blood’..."

Later this version of the story's background was corroborated by P. Surozhsky (the pseudonym of P.N. Shatilov) as well as Vladimir Bogoraz, in his essay "At the Chekhov Places".

"The Cold Blood" was first published on 31 October and 3 November 1887 by Novoye Vremya (issues Nos. 4193, 4196). It was included into the Chekhov collection Khmurye lyudi (Хмурые люди, Gloomy People), published in 1890 in Saint Petersburg, and was reproduced unchanged in the latter's ten re-issues. Chekhov included it into volume two of his Collected Works published by Adolf Marks in 1899-1901. During its author's lifetime, the story was translated into Bulgarian and Swedish language.

== Plot summary ==
The old man Malakhin, accompanied by his rather useless son Yasha, makes a journey to Saint Petersburg in a freight train with the view of selling his cattle. Everybody around is bent on extorting the money from him. The train driver simply refuses to move the train without being paid, and the uber-conductor has to have his reward too. Malakhin is so distressed as to file a written complaint to the police, still he throws his money around, even on the occasions when this does not seem necessary. Four days later, after having bribed his way to the capital, he sells his starved-out animals, loses a great deal of money but is greatly relieved to see his totally meaningless mission completed.

== Reception ==
According to the biographer Pyotr Sergeyenko, "The Cold Blood" was one of Lev Tolstoy's favourites. Vladimir Nemirovich-Danchenko remembered how Dmitry Grigorovich insisted the story was on par with the best work by Nikolai Gogol.

The critic Vladimir Kign also saw "The Cold Blood" as following the tradition set by Gogol. He wrote: "Up until now all our tribulations have been explained by the 'outside circumstances'. Chekhov looks deeper. His 'circumstances' lie within the Russian man. [This is the story] of a man who has to bribe continuously the rather wayward railway officials. They take the money willingly, although equally willingly does their victim, a merchant, transporting his bulls to Petersburg, gives them out. The impassive, almost idyllic good-naturedness with which both sides do what they do says a lot. The evil that had evolved into the form of idyll, cries not for mere denunciation, but for the new Dead Souls or Revizor. This is not malpractice anymore, this is catastrophe," he wrote in Books of the Week magazine.

Roman Disterlo considered the story to be shallow and superficial, the result of its author's "having decided to take a walk through life" in a search for some incidental impressions. Similar views were expressed by the author from the opposite side of the political spectrum, the Narodnik Nikolai Mikhaylovsky, who (not for the first time) accused Chekhov of being casual in his choice of themes and indifferent to his characters. He also failed to make sense of the story's title. "...It is unclear what 'cold blood' has to do with all this. There is of course, one very cool character in it, the son of a consigner, but he is not in the center of the story, which hardly has any center at all...", he wrote in Russkiye Vedomosti.

In 1895 Platon Krasnov analyzed the story in terms of the general state of the contemporary Russian society, overcome with apathy and dreariness. On the other hand, the critic Evgeny Lyatsky found the main character's behaviour very strange for a typical Russian merchant.
