= A Doctor's Visit =

- Short story by Anton Chekhov
- 1956 illustration by Solomon Boym
- Original title: Случай из практики
- Country: Russia
- Language: Russian

Publication
- Published in: Russkaya Mysl (1898)
- Publisher: Adolf Marks (1901)
- Publication date: December 1898

"A Doctor's Visit" (Russian: Случай из практики, romanized: Sluchai iz praktiki) is an 1898 short story by Anton Chekhov, also translated as "A Case History".

== Publication ==
The story was written in Yalta and had been completed by 11 November 1898. It was on this day that Chekhov informed his doctor friend I.I. Orlov in a letter: "By way of dealing with rain and bad weather sat down and wrote a story." On 14 November "A Doctor's Visit" was sent to Russkaya Mysl and was published in this magazine's No.12, December 1898 issue. With some minor edits Chekhov included it into Volume 9 of the Collected Works by A.P. Chekhov, published by Adolf Marks in 1899-1901.

== Plot summary ==
Korolyov, a young doctor, visits the house of Lyalikov, a recently deceased factory owner, to attend to the heiress, twenty-year old Liza, who has heart problems. The factory looks threatening, and Korolyov begins to construct a picture of it in his mind as the Devil's abode. He can't help but think of the unspeakable suffering that lurks behind these dark walls. The owners' house, surrounded by workshops and apparently run by the governess, looks equally unpleasant to him.

Korolyov finds nothing serious with Liza, her tachyarrhythmia caused, apparently, by anxiety, related to the feelings similar to those he himself has been overpowered with. Speaking of how lonely, lost and scared she is in this place, she mentions seeing 'the Devil where there is none', then bursts into crying. Korolyov is tempted to tell Liza that she'd better break free from this horrid place, but does not know how to. Yet the two seem to develop a kind of inner understanding. The next day she comes out of the house dressed in white, to see him off. She looks as if she wants to tell him something important, but does not know how to. Korolyov departs, leaving all of his dark thoughts behind, feeling inexplicably, almost happy.

=== Quote ===
"One is shy of asking men under sentence what they have been sentenced for; and in the same way it is awkward to ask very rich people what they want so much money for, why they make such a poor use of their wealth, why they don't give it up, even when they see in it their unhappiness; and if they begin a conversation about it themselves, it is usually embarrassing, awkward, and long.
'How is one to say it?' Korolyov wondered. 'And is it necessary to speak?' "

== Critical reception ==
The story was lauded by Ivan Gorbunov-Posadov (in a private, 24 January 1899 letter), Alexander Skabichevsky in Syn Otechestva and Angel Bogdanovich in Mir Bozhy, the latter two praising the narrative for being highly 'informative'. I. Johnson (the pseudonym of I.V. Ivanov) saw the story as marking the process of Chekhov's swift transformation from "the recent cool observer into a man with an aching, suffering heart."
