= The Man in a Case =

Sculpture in Taganrog, Russia

Coordinates: 47°12′56″N 38°55′18″E

- Russian: Скульптурная композиция «Человек в футляре»
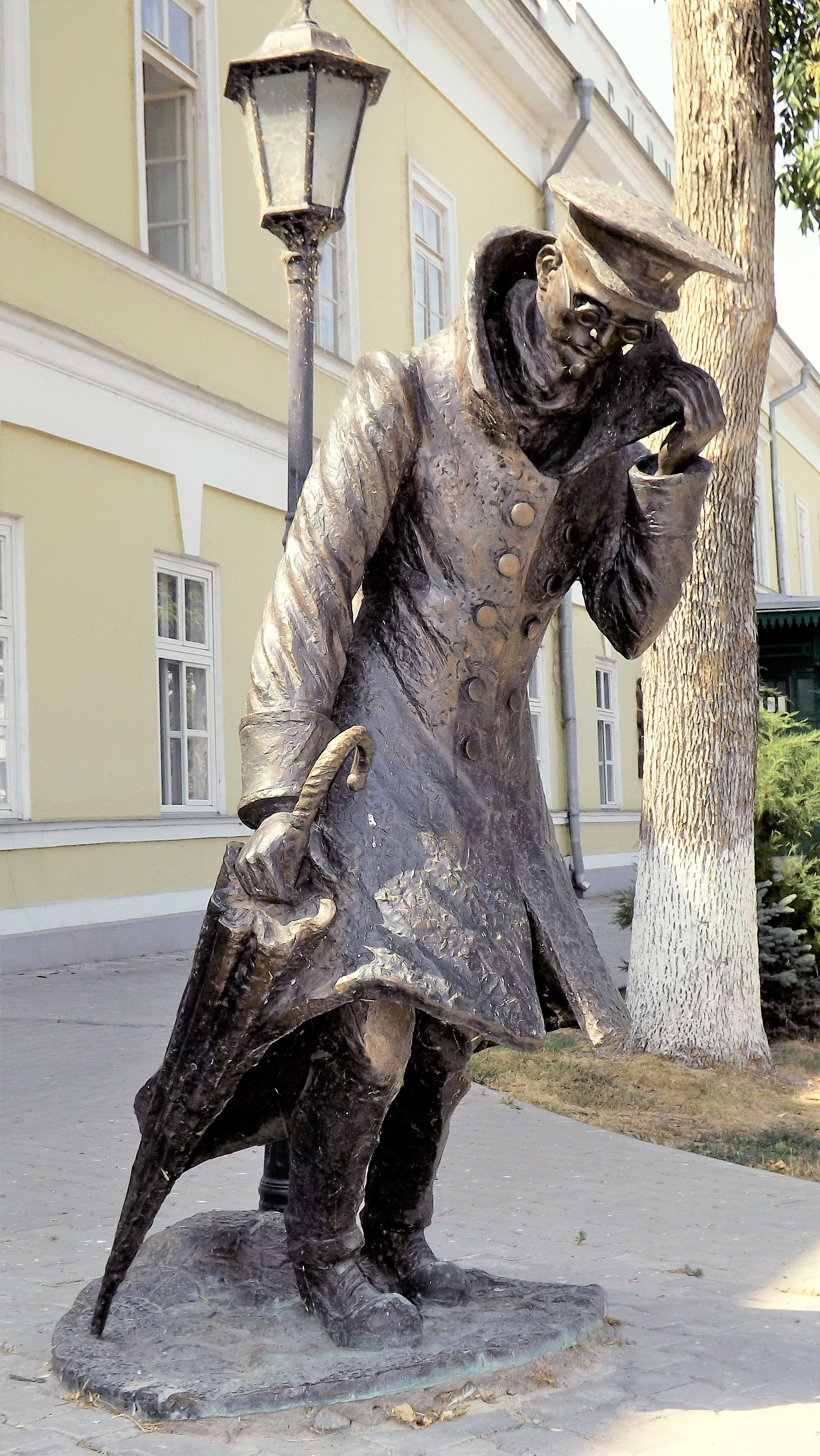
- Interactive map of The Man in a Case
- Location: Taganrog, Rostov Oblast, Russia
- Designer: David Begalov
- Opening date: January 27, 2010
- Dedicated to: A.P. Chekhov's 150 anniversary

The Man in a Case (Russian:Скульптурная композиция «Человек в футляре») is a sculpture in Taganrog, created by sculptor David Begalov based on the story of the same name by Anton Chekhov.

== Sculptural composition ==
The sculptural composition illustrates the story of the writer of the same name and represents pathetic, trying to take cover not from a rain and wind, not from the torments and fears of the teacher Belikov. It is installed before a facade of the left wing of the Taganrog men's classical gymnasium in which Anton Chekhov studied and one of Belikov's prototypes, "the Man in a case" worked.

The exact prototype of Belikov is unknown. Some contemporaries (including V.G. Bogoraz and M.P. Chekhov) considered that the teacher of Ancient Greek language and the inspector of the Taganrog gymnasium A.F. Dyakonov was a prototype of "the person in a case", others described the traits of character of Dyakonov disproving opinion of the first. So, P.P. Filevsky noted Dyakonov's generosity and wrote: "I positively claim that between "The man in a case" and A.F. Dyakonov there is nothing in common and no local color can be found in this work by A.P. Chekhov".

The cost of the municipal budget for the manufacture of sculpture and its installation amounted to 723,802 rubles. The monument is a municipal property.

== History of creation ==
On the eve of the Chekhov's anniversary, the city administration held a competition for the creation of this sculpture, in which David Begalov defeated. The monument was inaugurated on January 27, 2010, during the events dedicated to the A.P. Chekhov's 150 anniversary.
