= The Man in the Case =

- Short story by Anton Chekhov
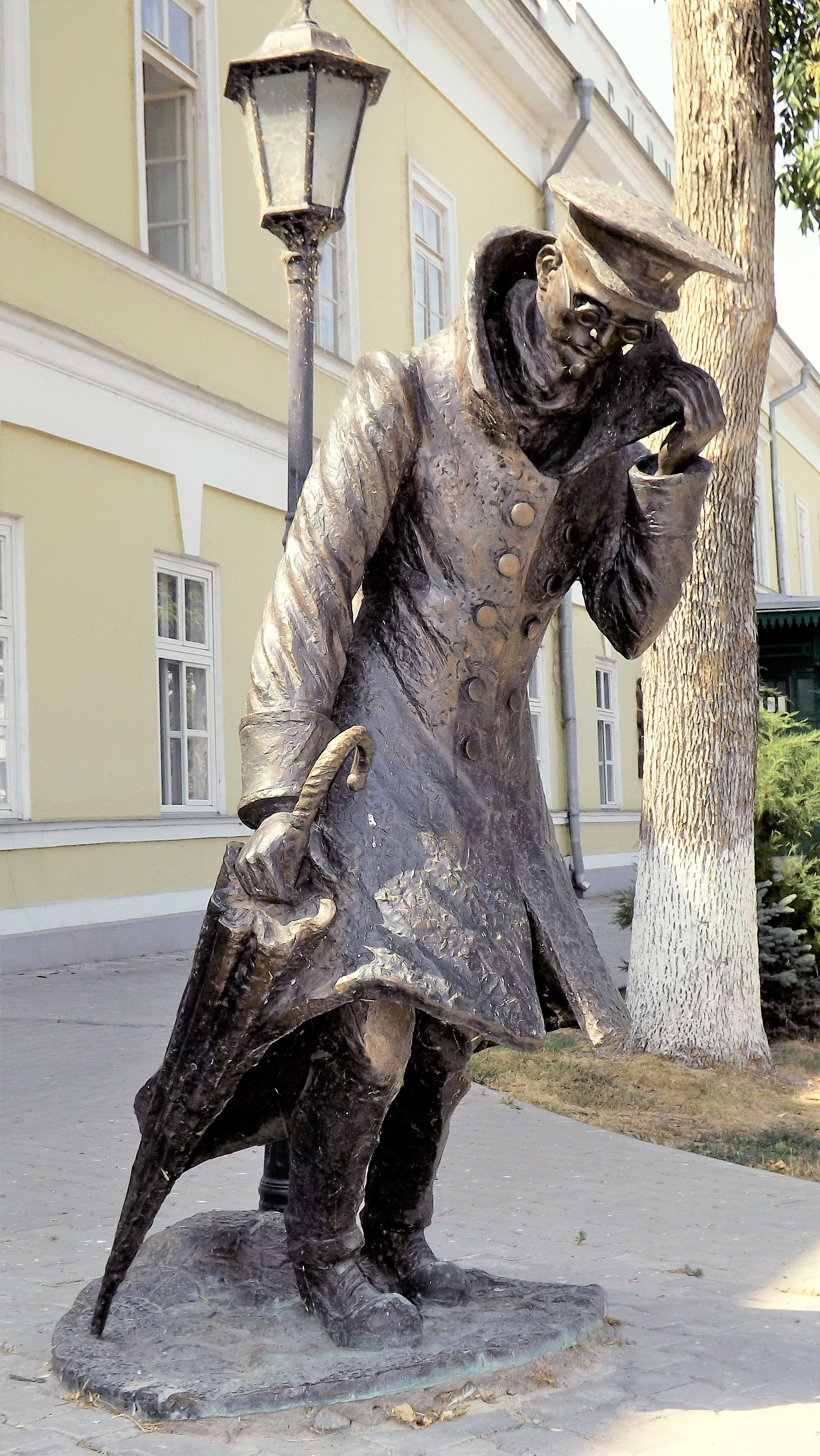
- The Belikov Monument next to the Chekhov Gymnasium in Taganrog
- Original title: Человек в футляре
- Country: Russia
- Language: Russian

Publication
- Published in: Russkaya Mysl (1898)
- Publisher: Adolf Marks (1901)
- Publication date: July 1898

"The Man in the Case" (Russian: Человек в футляре, romanized: Chelovek v futlyare) is an 1898 short story by Anton Chekhov, the first part of what has been later referred as The Little Trilogy, along with "Gooseberries" and "About Love".

== Publication ==
The story was written in Nice, France. On 15 June 1898 Chekhov sent it to Russkaya Mysl's editor Viktor Goltsev. It was first published in a No.7, July 1898 issue of this magazine. In a slightly revised version it made its way into Volume 12 of the 1903 second edition of the Collected Works by A.P. Chekhov, and then into Volume 11 of the 1906 third, posthumous edition.

== Background ==
According to the author's brother Mikhail Chekhov, the prototype for Belikov, the story's main character, was A.F. Dyakonov, the inspector of the Taganrog City Gymnasium which Chekhov was a graduate of. Other sources mentioned Dyakonov in this context too, including V.G. Tan-Bogoraz and P. Surozhsky. There were apparently other candidates. There is an entry in Chekhov's 1896 notebook that reads: "From 15 till 18 August M.O. Menshikov guested with me... Menshikov even in dry weather wears caloches, carries with him an umbrella so as not to perish from sunstroke and avoids washing his face with cold water"

== Plot ==
Film "Man in a Shell" (in Russian) based on this story

The story, narrated by Burkin, a gymnasium teacher, to his friend Ivan Ivanych Chimsha-Gimalayski after a long day spent hunting in the countryside, tells the story of his colleague Belikov, a teacher of Greek and the antagonist of the story.

Suffering from paranoia (he wears a pair of galoshes and a heavy coat even in the warmest weather) Belikov clings to official regulations and insists that others do so as well, being suspicious and wary of everything, because "one can never tell what harm might come from it". He terrorizes not only his school, but the whole town with his petty demands, protests against all sorts of real or imagined disorder. Everybody is scared of this man whose habit is visiting people and sitting silent for an hour by way of "maintaining good relations with his colleagues".

Then a new teacher named Mikhail Kovalenko is assigned to Belikov's school, and he brings with him his lively and cheerful sister Varenka. Instantly all the ladies at school decide that Belikov should marry her, and she seems not to mind. Belikov, like everybody else, is fascinated with this woman who arrives at the scene 'like Aphrodite', but is dogged by his usual fear of some unforeseen complications.

Things start to get wrong for Belikov when somebody draws a caricature of him in galoshes, with Varenka on his arm. By this he is horrified and totally thrown off his balance. Then one day he spots Varenka and her brother, cycling. Disgusted and frightened with how low teachers can fall in giving bad examples to pupils, he goes to visit Kovalenko to warn him of dire consequences of such behaviour. The latter tells him off, calling him 'a sneak', and, after Belikov threatens to report on him to the school authorities, promptly sends him rolling down the stairs. Belikov lands safely at the bottom, but, by chance, Varenka is there and, finding the scene terribly funny, she bursts with wild laughter. Belikov returns home, removes the portrait of his beloved from the table, goes to bed, falls ill and in a month's time, dies.

The teachers return from the cemetery in a good humour, hoping that things will now start to change for the better, but life goes on "...as in the past, as gloomy, oppressive, and senseless—a life not forbidden by government prohibition, but not fully permitted, either", according to Burkin.

== Reception ==
The story divided the contemporary critical opinion. The right-wing press in general reacted negatively, one particularly hostile review (titled "Some Things on Chekhov and his Cases") coming from K. Medvedsky, in Moskovskiye Vedomosti. Nikolai Minsky in Birzhevaya Gazeta interpreted the story as a mild, 'decadent' quasi-social etude, making much of Chekhov's perceived 'indifference' to his characters. Akim Volynsky in Severny Vestnik interpreted the story as a self-conscious hymn to 'a little man'.

In retrospect, the first truly insightful analysis of the Belikov character in relation to the political and social atmosphere in Russia at the time, came from Angel Bogdanovich who (in the October 1898 issue of Mir Bozhy) praised Chekhov for discovering a new, and yet totally realistic social type. Still, Bogdanovich saw the story as utterly pessimistic and complained about the author's 'morbid' mindset, which prevents him from becoming a truly great realist.

Highly positive was the review in Syn Otechestva by Alexander Skabichevsky who credited Chekhov with being not only a fine artist but also shrewd social commentator. He rated the Belikov character right up there with the most memorable creations by Gogol and Goncharov.

== Adaptations ==
- A 1939 film, The Man in the Case, was directed by Isidor Annensky.
