= Lawsuit (disambiguation) =

A lawsuit is a legal case.

Lawsuit may also refer to:

- The Lawsuit (opera), a 2009 comic opera by Svetlana Nesterova, based Nikolai Gogol's work
- The Lawsuit, a fragmentary scene by Nicolai Gogol from the unfinished play The Order of Vladimir, Third Class
- "Lawsuit" (Space Ghost Coast to Coast), a television episode
