= George Patten =

English painter (1801–1865)

George Patten (29 June 1801 – 11 March 1865) was a British portraitist.

== Life ==
Patten was born on 29 June 1801, the son of William Patten, a miniature-painter, whose works were exhibited at the Royal Academy between 1791 and 1844, and who died on 22 August 1843. He received his early training in art from his father, and in 1816 became a student in the Royal Academy Schools, where he first exhibited a miniature of his father in 1819. In 1828, he again entered the schools of the academy, and took up oil painting in 1830.

In 1837, Patten went to Italy, visiting Rome, Venice, and Parma; and on his return to England he was elected an associate of the Royal Academy. Early in 1840, he went to Germany to paint a portrait of Prince Albert which was exhibited at the Royal Academy, and engraved by Charles Eden Wagstaff. He was later appointed portrait-painter in ordinary to the Prince.

During the latter part of his life Patten lived at Goodrich Cross, Ross, Herefordshire, but before his death he returned to Winchmore Hill, Middlesex. He died suddenly at Hill House, his residence there, on 11 March 1865, aged sixty-three, and was buried in the churchyard of All Saints' Church, Edmonton.

== Family ==
By his wife Lucy, Patten had children including Alfred Fowler Patten (born 1829), a genre painter, and Clara Maria, mother of Arthur Black, Clementina Black and Constance Garnett.

== Works ==
Patten had patronage in the painting of presentation portraits, many of which appeared in the exhibitions of the Royal Academy. Among these were portraits of Richard Cobden, Lord Francis Egerton, Hugh Boyd M'Neile, Baptist Wriothesley Noel, and Paganini the violinist, exhibited in 1833. He exhibited his own portrait in 1858.

Patten painted also mythological, fancy, and scriptural subjects. Among them were:

- A Nymph and Child, exhibited at the Royal Academy in 1831;
- A Bacchante in 1833;
- Maternal Affection and Cymon and Iphigenia in 1834;
- Bacchus and Ino in 1836;
- The Passions, suggested by the ode by William Collins, in 1838;
- Hymen burning the Arrows of Cupid and Eve in 1842;
- Dante's Descent with Virgil to the Inferno in 1843;
- The Madness of Hercules in 1844;
- The Mouse's Petition in 1845;
- Pandora in 1846;
- Cupid taught by the Graces and Flora and Zephyrus in 1848;
- The Destruction of Idolatry in England in 1849;
- Susannah and the Elders and Bacchus discovering the use of the Grape in 1850;
- Love defending Beauty from the Assaults of Time in 1851;
- Apollo and Clytie in 1857;
- The Bower of Bliss in 1858;
- The Prophet Isaiah in 1860; and
- The Youthful Apollo preparing to engage in a musical contest with Paris, the last of his exhibited works, in 1864.

Several of these appeared also at the British Institution, together with Returning Home, in 1833; A Bacchante in 1834; Venus caressing her favourite Dove in 1836; a Wood-Nymph in 1838; The Graces in 1840; and Bacchus consoling Ariadne for the Loss of Theseus in 1841.

== Gallery ==
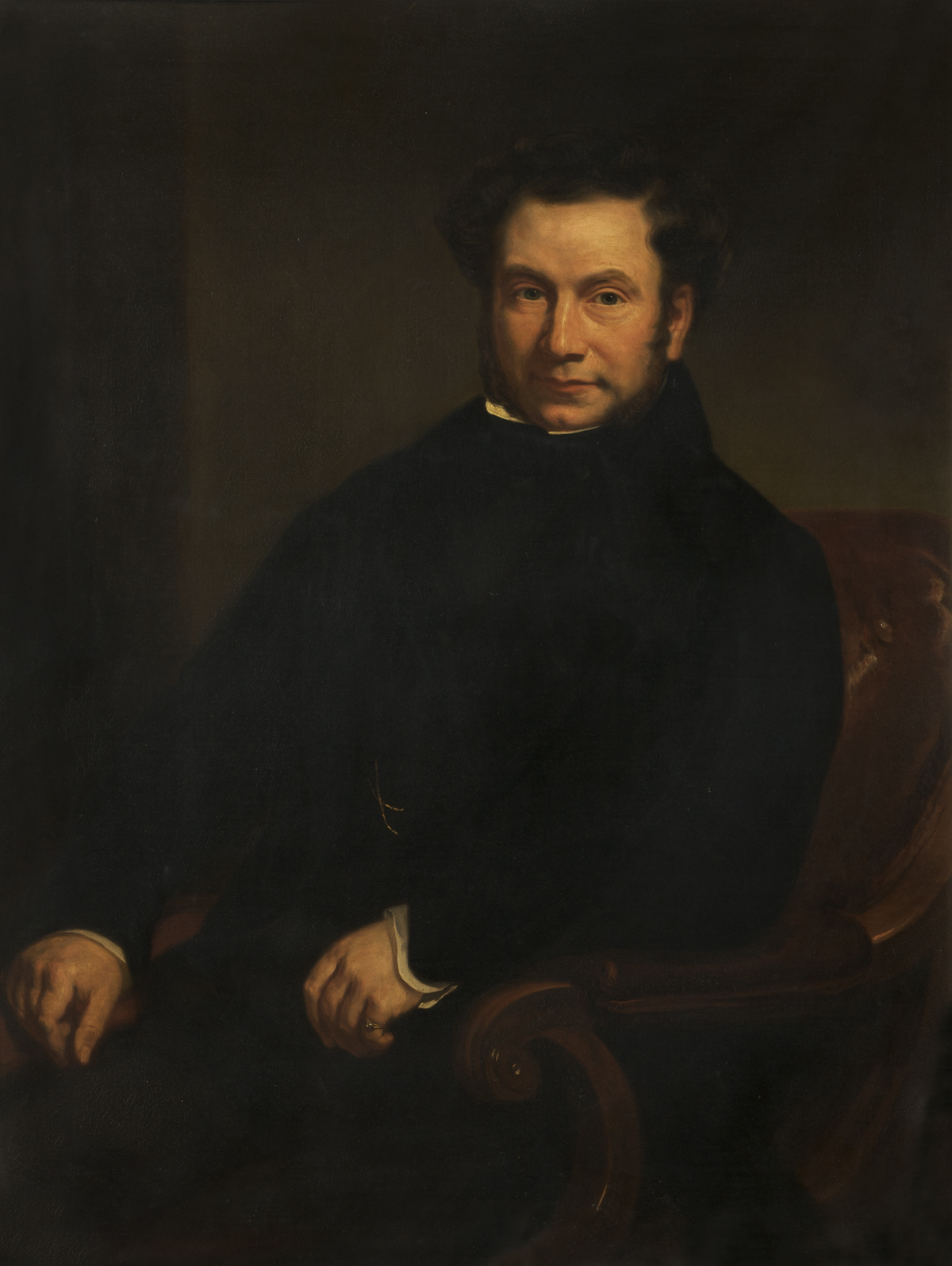
Benjamin Hick, c.1840.

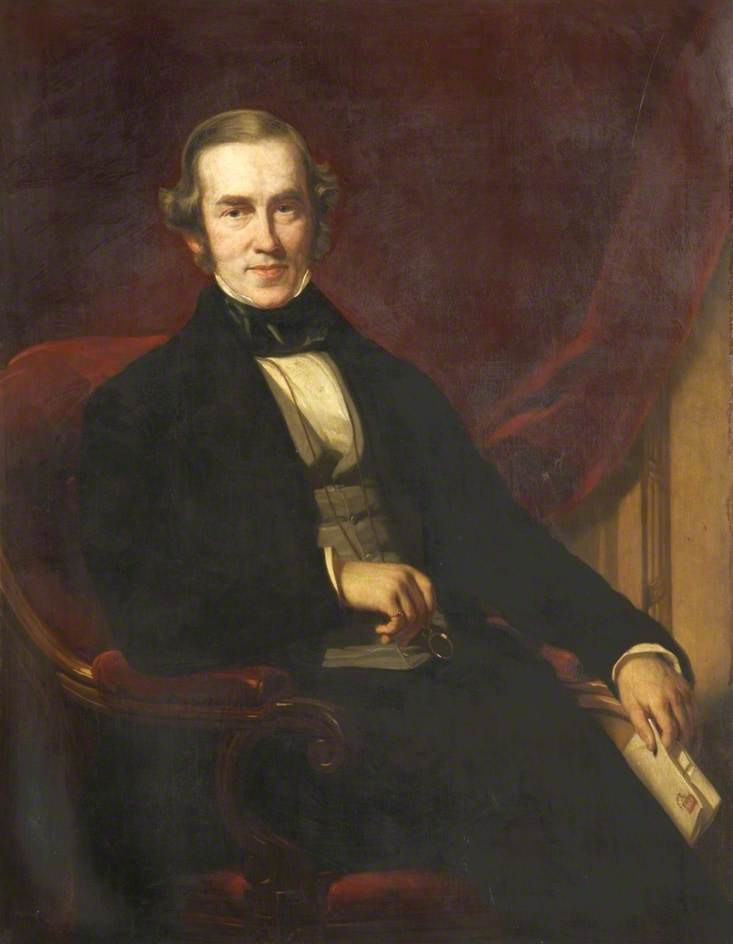
Thomas Horsfall, 1853.

== Notes ==
Attribution

This article incorporates text from a publication now in the public domain: Lee, Sidney, ed. (1895). "Patten, George". Dictionary of National Biography. Vol. 44. London: Smith, Elder & Co.
