= Privolzhye =

Privolzhye (Russian: Приволжье) is the name of several rural localities in Russia:

- Privolzhye, Samara Oblast, a selo in Privolzhsky District of Samara Oblast
- Privolzhye, Tver Oblast, a village in Zubtsovskoye Rural Settlement of Zubtsovsky District of Tver Oblast
- Privolzhye, Yaroslavl Oblast, a village in Lomovsky Rural Okrug of Rybinsky District of Yaroslavl Oblast
