= Emma Black =

Emma Black may refer to:

- Emma Black (footballer) (born 1987), Scottish footballer
- Emma Black (painter), British painter active in the nineteenth century
- Emma Black (cricketer) (born 2001), New Zealand cricketer
