= Gusev (short story) =

- Short story by Anton Chekhov
- Original title: Гусев
- Country: Russia
- Language: Russian

Publication
- Published in: Novoye Vremya
- Publisher: Adolf Marks, 1900
- Publication date: 25 December (old style) 1890

"Gusev" (Russian: Гусев) is an 1890 short story by Anton Chekhov.

== Publication ==
According to Chekhov's 9 December letter to Alexey Suvorin, the story was partly based upon the real life incident, the burial at sea which he had witnessed on board the ship, when returning from Sakhalin. It was first published in the 25 December (old style) 1890, No. 5326 (Christmas) issue of Novoye Vremya, with a note: "Colombo, 12 November".

Divided into five chapters and after some stylistic editing it was included in the Ward No. 6 1893 short stories collection and reproduced unchanged in its seven (1893–1899) editions. With some further minor corrections it was included by Chekhov in Volume 6 of his Collected Works, published by Adolf Marks in 1899–1901.

== Synopsis ==
Several discharged soldiers return home from the Far East by ship. Confined to the hospital cabin, they are all apparently dying of consumption and seemingly indifferent to their condition. Among them are Gusev, a mild, racist, slightly dim man, and the mysterious Pavel Ivanovich, an ardent "protester" who often goes on diatribes (many of which Gusev either misunderstands or ignores) about his lifelong commitment to telling people "the truth to their faces". Ivanovich is proud of having riled every single person around him during his three years' service in the East, and thinks all the other men present are fools. He later reveals that he is the son of a priest and had to disguise himself as a peasant to buy his third-class ticket. One day, while Gusev is asleep, Pavel Ivanovich dies. One of the other soldiers, seeing that Gusev will also die shortly, helps him up to the ship's deck, where they look at the waves crashing into one another. Several days later, Gusev dies. His body is sewn into a sailcloth sack and weighted. After a short prayer, it is thrown into the ocean, where a shark bites at it. Up above, the ocean begins to reflect the colors of the sky, "...tender, joyous, passionate colours for which it is hard to find a name in human speech".

== Reception ==
Among those who went on record as having lauded the story, were Pyotr Chaykovsky and Alexey Pleshcheyev, who wrote (on 12 January 1891): "Everybody there is delighted with the story in the Christmas edition of Novoye Vremya. This portrait of a 'protester' has been done masterfully".

"The whole of St Petersburg is mad about your Gusev", brother Alexander informed Chekhov in his 30 December 1890 letter.

In her 1919 work Modern Fiction, Virginia Woolf mentions Gusev to illustrate how Russian literature is spiritual, compared to English literature, which is essentially materialist. The story also provides an example of "Russian inconclusion", derived from the inability to provide truth in a final form.

The writer Mary Gaitskill listed it as among her favorite short stories.

Comedian Norm Macdonald also expressed enthusiasm for the story, saying: “You sort of go, ‘What? It’s still going on? The guy’s dead. He’s still asked to endure these indignities!’ It’s a really cruel ending, and I like that.”
