= Lydia Avilova =

Russian writer and memoirist

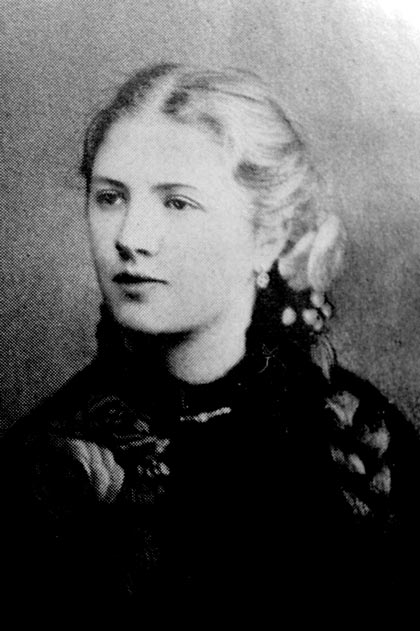
- Born: Lydia Alexeyevna Strakhova; Лидия Алексеевна Страхова; 15 June [O.S. 3 June] 1864; Tula Governorate, Imperial Russia
- Died: 27 September 1943 (aged 79); Moscow, Soviet Union
- Occupation: short story writer • novelist • memoirist

Lydia Alexeyevna Avilova (Russian: Ли́дия Алексе́евна Ави́лова, née Стра́хова (Strakhova); 15 June 1864 – 27 September 1943) was a Russian writer and memoirist, best known for her book A.P. Chekhov in My Life, published posthumously in 1947.

== Biography ==
Lydia Alekseyevna Strakhova was born in the Klekotki estate, Tula Governorate, Russian Empire, into the family of a local gentry. After graduating from a gymnasium in 1882, she worked for a while as a school mistress, then in 1887 got married and moved from Moscow to Saint Petersburg and started writing. A frequent guest at the house of the editor and publisher Sergey Khudekov (her sister Nadezhda's husband), she was introduced to many well-known authors of the time. In 1889 she met Anton Chekhov and became his regular correspondent, receiving regular advice on the literary technique and style, as well as occasional help with making her stories published.

In 1890, assisted by Alexander Sheller-Mikhaylov, Avilova debuted as a published author with a short story called "Two Beauties" (Две красоты). Since then her work started to appear regularly in the periodicals like Sever (North), Detskoye Chteniye (Children's Reading), Niva, Russkiye Vedomosti, Syn Otechestva, Novoye Slovo. In 1896 Avilova's first story collection Lucky Man and Other Stories (Счастливец и другие рассказы) came out, to be followed two years later by her debut novel Inheritors (Наследники). Her second novel Deceit (Обман) was published by Vestnik Evropy in July 1901.

In 1906 Avilova returned with her family to Moscow and in the course of the next ten years published several books, including The Power and Other Stories (Власть и другие рассказы, 1906) and First Grief and Other Stories (Первое горе и другие рассказы, (1913), most of them dealing with childhood and child psychology, and much indebted to Chekhov's legacy. In 1914 Avilova became a member of the Russian Literary Society and in 1918 joined the Union of Writers. In 1922 she visited her ailing daughter in Czechoslovakia and became close to the local circle of Russian emigres, but decided to return to the Soviet Union in 1924. "Where there is no Russia, there is no myself," she wrote. In 1929 she was elected an honorary member of The Soviet Chekhov society.

Lydia Avilova died in Moscow on 27 September 1943. She was buried at the Vagankovo Cemetery, but the location of her grave has been lost since. The interest in Avilova's literary legacy enjoyed a revival in the 1980s when several of her books were re-issued in the USSR.

=== Avilova as memoirist ===
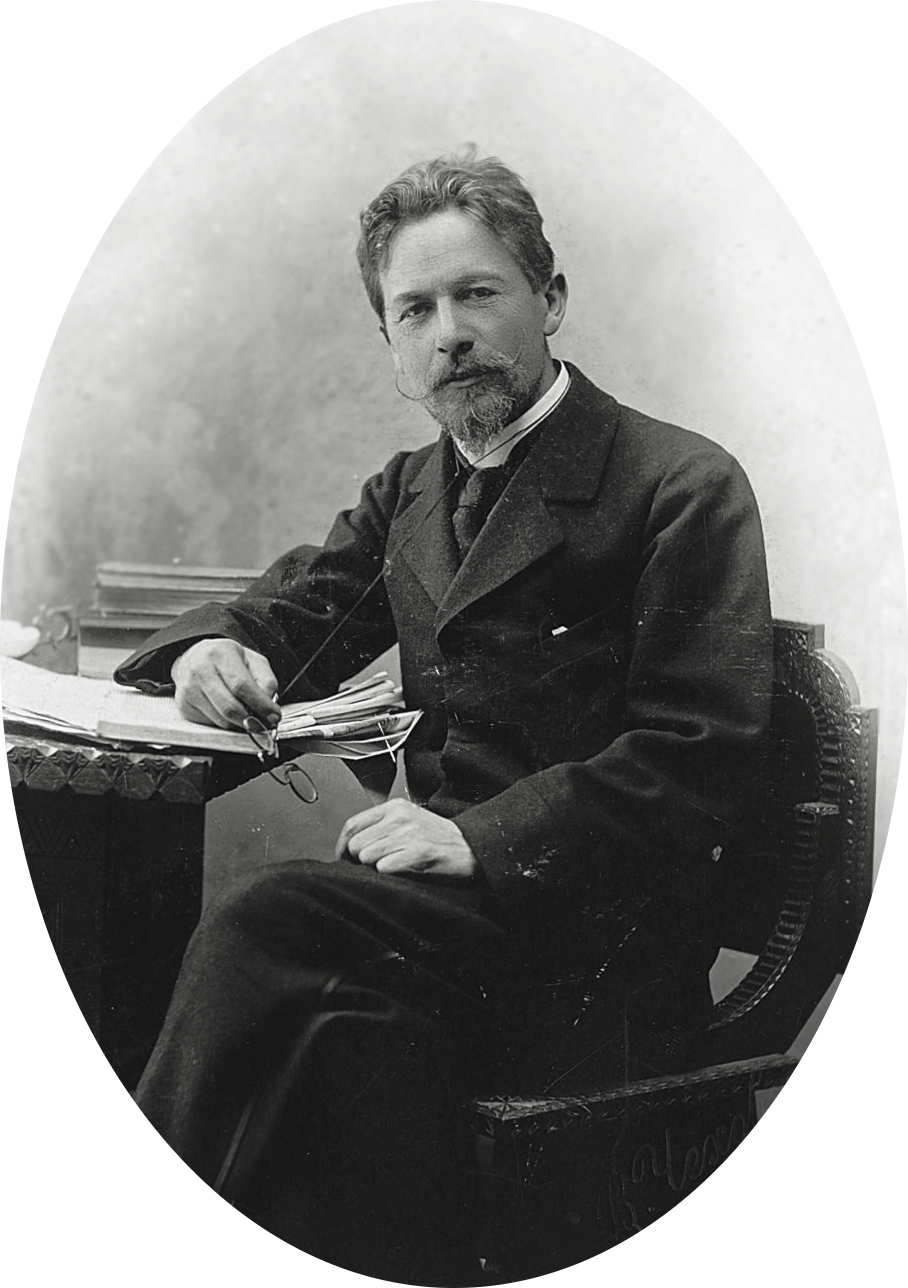
Chekhov in 1889, the year he and Avilova met for the first time

Avilova's final work, a book of memoirs called A.P. Chekhov in My Life (А.П. Чехов в моей жизни, originally "The Love Affair of My Life", Роман моей жизни), was completed in 1939 and published posthumously, in 1947, caused much controversy. It was based upon the premise that the two "had had a secret love affair which lasted a decade and nobody was aware of." Avilova claimed that Chekhov's "About Love" (1898) was a thinly veiled comment on their secret relationships and that the two discussed this fact in their correspondence, one of his letters (which was among the ones she had destroyed) having been even signed "Alyuokhin", which was the name of this story's protagonist.

Maria Chekhova reacted with skepticism to this revelation. "These memoirs are lively and exciting, and many of the things she states in them are undoubtedly true... Lydia Alexeyevna seems to be totally sincere when describing her own feelings to Anton Pavlovich... When it comes to his own feeling towards her, things start to look a bit too 'subjective'," she wrote in her book From Distant Past. Ivan Bunin, on the other hand, never doubted the memoirist's sincerity. He wrote: "Avilova's memoirs, brilliant, highly emotional, written masterfully and with great tact, became a revelation to me. I knew well Lydia Alexeyevna, a gifted woman with a rare sense of humour, who was also a very honest and shy person... Never did I suspect though, that they had this sort of relationship."

In one of her retrospective reviews, making a collective portrait of Chekhov, Tolstoy and Gorky, Avilova wrote: "... As for Chekhov, I would not call him either a great man or a great writer ... He was a likeable, talented author, an intelligent man and an intriguing character. Gorky: a brilliant writer and highly original man. Tolstoy: a great writer, a great thinker and a great man. Think of a talent breaking through the personality, struggling to lift it up to its own level, and that is Chekhov. Think of a talent and personality which are equally strong and bright; they express themselves in different ways, but, intertwining, merge into one. That is Gorky. But when both the literary gift and the personality are not just great and powerful, but also perfect, soaring well above mankind and near to God's level, then that is Tolstoy."
