= An Honest Thief =

Short story by Fyodor Dostoyevsky

- Short story by Fyodor Dostoyevsky
- Original title: Честный вор
- Translator: Constance Garnett; David Magarshack; Roger Cockrell et al.
- Country: Russian Empire
- Language: Russian
- Genre: Short story

Publication

"An Honest Thief" (Russian: Честный вор, Chestny vor) is an 1848 short story by Fyodor Dostoyevsky. The story recounts the tale of the tragic drunkard, Emelyan Ilyitch.

== Synopsis ==
The story opens with the narrator taking in a lodger, an old soldier named Astafy Ivanovich, at his apartment. One day, a thief steals the narrator's coat, and Astafy pursues him unsuccessfully. Astafy is dismayed by the theft and goes over and over the scenario. The narrator and Astafy share a distinct contempt for thieves, and one night Astafy tells the narrator a story of an honest thief that he had once known.

One night in a pub, Astafy Ivanovich happened upon Emelyan Ilyitch. The two knew each other previously, but from the look of his tattered coat, Emelyan had fallen on hard times. He was aching for a drink but had no money. Astafy, moved by Emelyan's pathetic position, had bought him a drink. From then on, Emelyan followed Astafy everywhere, eventually even moving into his apartment. Astafy did not have much money himself, but he allowed Emelyan's imposition because he was very aware that his drinking was a terrible problem. Emelyan would not stop his drinking, however, and even though he was quiet and not disruptive when he was drunk, Astafy could see that Emelyan would never be able to support himself with such a habit. Astafy urged him to stop drinking, but to no avail. Eventually, Astafy effectively gave up on him and moved, never expecting to see Emelyan again.

Very soon after Astafy had moved, Emelyan appeared at his new apartment, and the two continued to go on as they had before. Astafy would support Emelyan with food and lodging, and Emelyan would always go out and come back drunk. Sometimes he would disappear for days only to return drunk and almost frozen.

Astafy, now working as a tailor, was short on money. One of his projects, a pair of riding breeches for a wealthy customer, was never claimed. He thought he could sell the breeches to get money for more useful clothes and some food, but he then discovered that they were nowhere to be found. Emelyan was drunk as usual, and denied the theft. Astafy was terribly vexed by the theft, and kept looking for the breeches while still suspicious of Emelyan. Emelyan always denied the theft.

One day, Astafy and Emelyan had a terrible fight over the breeches and Emelyan's drinking. Emelyan left the apartment and did not return for days. Astafy even went to look for him, but with no success. Eventually, after a couple of days, Emelyan returned, almost starved and frozen. Astafy took him back in, but it was clear that Emelyan's days were numbered. Days later, after Emelyan's health had deteriorated terribly, Emelyan wanted to tell Astafy something about the breeches. With his last words, Emelyan admitted to stealing the breeches.
