= A Provincial Lady =

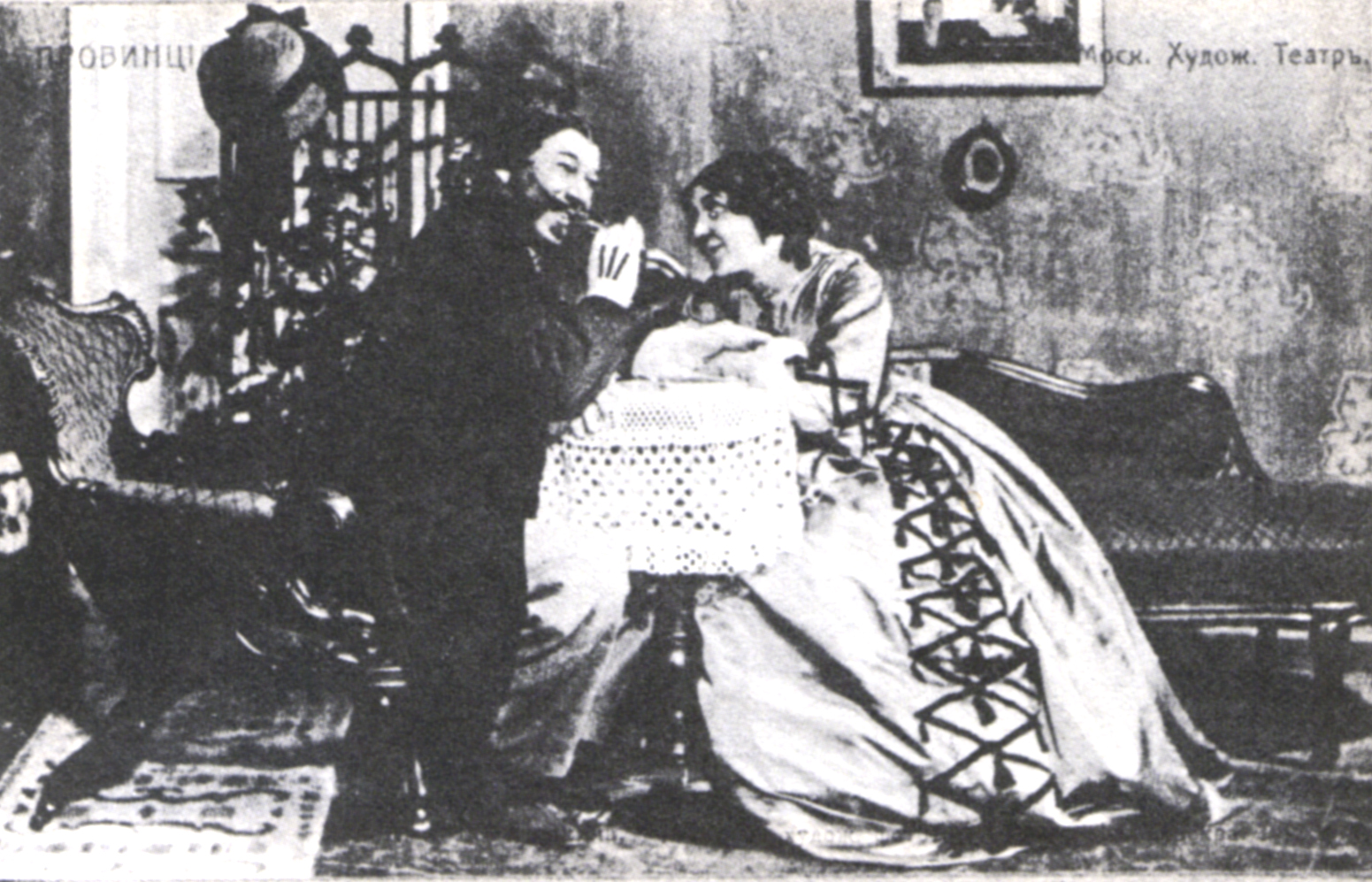
- Stanislavski and his wife Lilina in the Moscow Art Theatre production in 1912.
- Written by: Ivan Turgenev
- Original language: Russian
- Genre: One-act play

Premiere
- Date premiered: January 1851
- Place premiered: Maly Theatre, Moscow

A Provincial Lady (Russian: Провинциалка, romanized: Provintsialka) is a one-act play by Ivan Turgenev. Written in 1850, it was first produced in January 1851 at a benefit performance for the seminal 19th-century Russian actor Mikhail Shchepkin at the Maly Theatre in Moscow.

In the 20th century, the play was produced at the world-famous Moscow Art Theatre as part of a triple bill of works by Turgenev. Constantin Stanislavski directed and played Count Liubin. It opened on 5 March 1912.

== Sources ==
- Banham, Martin, ed. 1998. The Cambridge Guide to Theatre. Cambridge: Cambridge UP. ISBN 0-521-43437-8.
- Benedetti, Jean. 1999. Stanislavski: His Life and Art. Revised edition. Original edition published in 1988. London: Methuen. ISBN 0-413-52520-1.
- Moser, Charles A., ed. 1992. The Cambridge History of Russian Literature. Rev. ed. Cambridge: Cambridge UP. ISBN 0-521-42567-0.
