= Emma Black (painter) =

British painter

Emma Black, also known as Emma Keriman Mahomed, was a British nineteenth century painter.

She was the sister of translator Constance Garnett, and of Clementina Black, a novelist and social reformer.

She was a resident of Brighton, and exhibited there in 1881. She also exhibited her works, one of which was a portrait of the writer Dollie Radford, at the Royal Academy under her married name Emma Keriman Mahomed in 1883 and 1884.

She married the Reverend James Dean Keriman Mahomed in September 1883.
