= Privolzhsky District, Samara Oblast =

Privolzhsky District Приволжский район (Russian)
- District
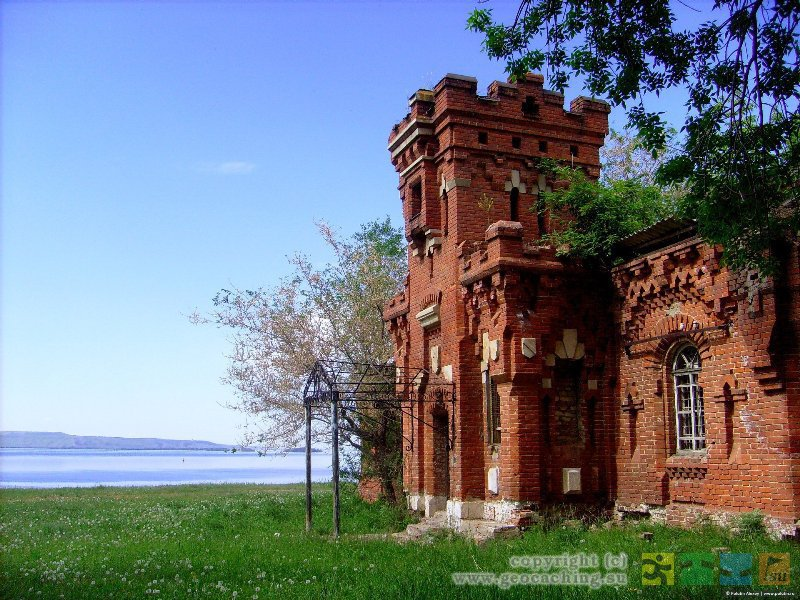
- Samarin Manor, Privolzhsky District

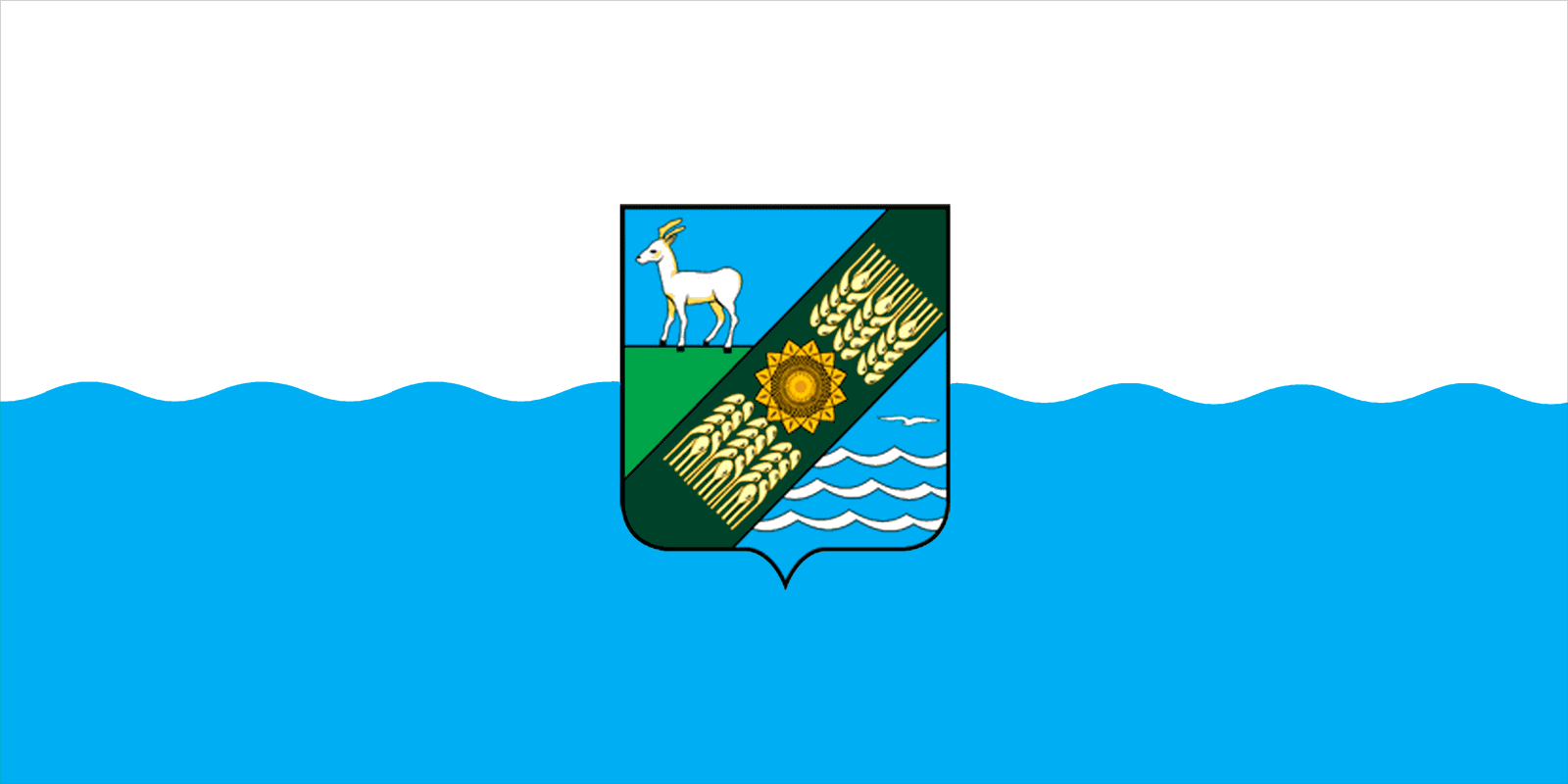
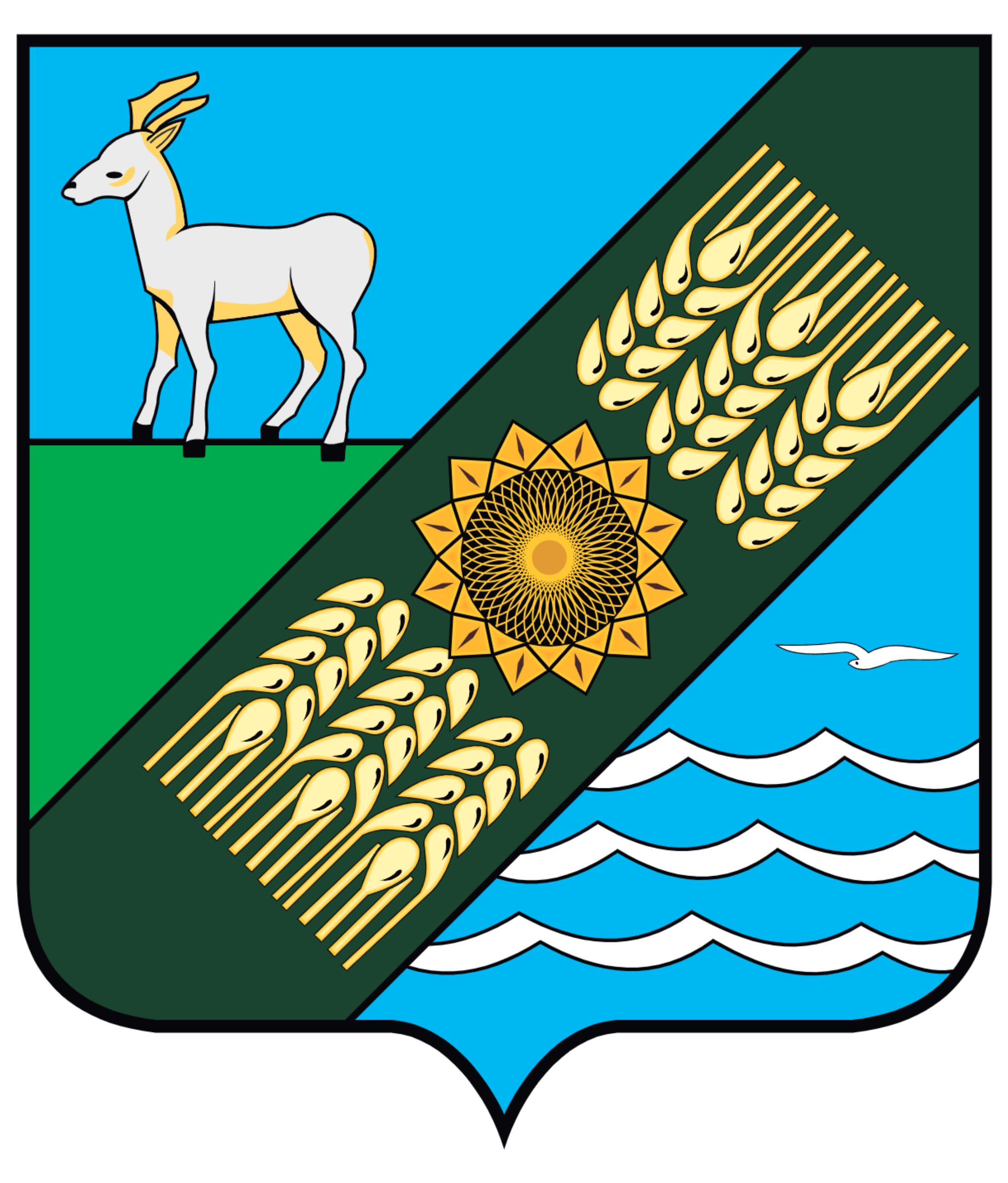
- Flag Coat of arms
- Location of Privolzhsky District in Samara Oblast
- Coordinates: 52°51′08″N 48°35′34″E
- Country: Russia
- Federal subject: Samara Oblast
- Established: 18 December 1930
- Administrative center: Privolzhye

Area
  - Total: 1,379.3 km^{2} (532.6 sq mi)

Population (2010 Census)
  - Total: 24,005
  - Density: 17.404/km^{2} (45.076/sq mi)
  - Urban: 0%
  - Rural: 100%

Administrative structure
  - Inhabited localities: 24 rural localities

Municipal structure
  - Municipally incorporated as: Privolzhsky Municipal District
  - Municipal divisions: 0 urban settlements, 7 rural settlements
- Time zone: UTC+4 (MSK+1)
- OKTMO ID: 36636000
- Website: http://www.pv.samregion.ru/

Privolzhsky District (Russian: Приво́лжский райо́н) is an administrative and municipal district (raion), one of the twenty-seven in Samara Oblast, Russia. It is located in the west of the oblast. The area of the district is 1,379.3 square kilometers (532.6 sq mi). Its administrative center is the rural locality (a selo) of Privolzhye. Population: 24,005 (2010 Census); 24,552 (2002 census); 23,058 (1989 Soviet census). The population of Privolzhye accounts for 31.2% of the district's total population.
