= The Jew (short story) =

Short story by Russian author Ivan Turgenev

"The Jew" (Russian: Жид, romanized: Zhid) is an 1847 short story by Ivan Turgenev. A young Russian officer, in the camp outside Danzig where Napoleon's army is besieged in 1813, falls in love with the daughter of Girshel, a Jew who follows the Russian camp. Girshel does everything to promote his interest, but is arrested for espionage on behalf of the besieged French, and hanged by order of the military authorities, despite the officer's request for pardon.
