= Privolzhye, Samara Oblast =

Rural locality in Samara Oblast, Russia

Coordinates: 52°51′27″N 48°35′17″E

Privolzhye (Russian: Приволжье) is a rural locality (a selo) and the administrative center of Privolzhsky District, Samara Oblast, Russia. Population: 7,480 (2010 census); 7,481 (2002 census); 7,158 (1989 Soviet census).
