= Easter Eve (short story) =

- Short story by Anton Chekhov
- Original title: Святою ночью
- Country: Russia
- Language: Russian

Publication
- Published in: Novoye Vremya
- Publication date: 23 February 1886

"Easter Eve" (Russian: Святою ночью, romanized: Svyatoyu nochyu) is an 1886 short story by Anton Chekhov.

== Publication ==
The story was first published on 5 March (old style: 23 February), in Novoye Vremya's No. 3636, 26 (13 o.s.) April 1886 issue. In an edited version it made its way into the In the Twilight (В сумерках), 1887 collection, published in Saint Petersburg. In 1898 the Tilde Press released it as a separate edition. Chekhov included it into Volume 3 of his Collected Works published by Adolf Marks in 1899–1901.

== Synopsis ==
The protagonist takes a trip across the Goltva river on the Easter Eve to visit a local church and enjoy the nightly Easter festivities. On his way he is engaged in a conversation with a monk ferryman named Ieronym, a slightly eccentric 30-something man who is deeply shattered by the recent death of his best friend and mentor, monk Nikolai. The latter appears to have been a genius master of Akathist, who had never in his life had one single reader or listener of his wonderful stories, beside Ieronym... The protagonist returns by the same ferry, disturbed by the cruel contrast between the joyful, flamboyant church service, and the grief and loneliness of this extremely sensitive person, so forsaken in this world, on the other... Where nobody had even cared to send him a changer, so that he now has to start his second shift in a row.

== Reception ==
The theatre historian Nikolai Drizen (in his 1929 essay) quoted Alexey Pleshcheyev as saying: "Reading [In Twilight], I felt as though Turgenev's aura was embracing me... The same placid poetry of prose, these wondrous descriptions of nature..." The story that impressed him most was "Easter Eve", according to Drizen.

Dmitry Merezhkovsky, reviewing two Checkhov's collections, In Twilight (1887) and Stories (1888), compared "Easter Eve" to the poems in prose by Turgenev and Baudelaire. Speaking of the monk Nikolai character, he interpreted him as another loser, similar to Likharev from "On the Way" [На пути, published in Severny Vestnik, No.11, 1888]. Chekhov felt baffled. "What kind of loser he is? He'd had an enviable life. Was close to God, knew not of hunger, was endowed with literary gift... Dividing people into losers and winners is too narrow an approach," he wrote to Alexey Suvorin in a letter dated 3 November 1888.
