= Arthur Black (mathematician) =

English mathematician (1851–1893)

Arthur Black (1851–1893) was an English mathematician.

== Life ==
Black was the eldest son of David Black of Brighton, a solicitor and coroner, and brother to Clementina Black, the social reformer and author Constance Garnett and Grace Human. He became a student of William Clifford at University College London. He was in a business partnership with the lawyer Robert Singleton Garnett, elder brother to Edward Garnett. In 1893 he killed his wife, son and himself. His daughter Gertrude Speedwell Black (1887–1963) survived, and married H. J. Massingham.

Black's work remained unpublished at the time of his suicide. Micaiah John Muller Hill saw to the publication of a paper on a general Gaussian integral. Notebooks survive, including attempts to formulate a quantitative theory of evolution; they also contain a derivation of the chi-squared distribution. A long manuscript, Algebra of Animal Evolution, was sent to Karl Pearson, who then transmitted it to Francis Galton; it is now lost. Pearson and Walter Frank Raphael Weldon thought highly of the work, but Galton had reservations.

== Death ==
Black died by suicide after killing his wife and son. His daughter survived.
