= Modern Fiction (essay) =

1919 essay by Virginia Woolf

"Modern Fiction" is an essay by Virginia Woolf. The essay was published in The Times Literary Supplement on 10 April 1919 as "Modern Novels" then revised and published as "Modern Fiction" in The Common Reader (1925). The essay is a criticism of writers and literature from the previous generation. It also acts as a guide for writers of modern fiction to write what they feel, not what society or publishers want them to write.

== Synopsis ==
In "Modern Fiction", Woolf elucidates upon what she understands modern fiction to be. Woolf states that a writer should write what inspires them and not follow any special method. She believed writers were constrained by the publishing business, by what society believed literature should look like and by how society has dictated literature should be written. She also believed it was a writer's job to write about the complexities in life and the unknowns, not the unimportant things.

In her essay, Woolf criticizes H. G. Wells, Arnold Bennett, and John Galsworthy for writing about unimportant things, and she calls them "materialists". She suggests that literature should turn its back on them so it can move forward, for better or worse. While Woolf criticizes the aforementioned three authors, she praises several other authors for their innovation. This group of writers she names "spiritualists" and includes James Joyce who Woolf says writes about what interests and moves him.

Woolf wanted writers to focus on the awkwardness of life and craved originality in their work. Her overall hope was to inspire modern fiction writers to write about what interested them, wherever it may lead.

== Themes ==
=== Virginia Woolf as critic ===
Virginia Woolf was known as a critic by her contemporaries and many scholars have attempted to analyse Woolf as a critic. In her essay, "Modern Fiction", she criticizes H.G. Wells, Arnold Bennett and John Galsworthy and mentions and praises Thomas Hardy, Joseph Conrad, William Henry Hudson, James Joyce and Anton Chekhov.

As a critic, she does not take an analytical point of view and it is believed to be due to the influences of impressionism at the time that she was able to do so. Her writing and criticism was often done by intuition and feelings rather than by a scientific, analytical or systematic method. Virginia Woolf says of criticism:

Life escapes; and perhaps without life nothing else is worth while. It is a confession of vagueness to have to make use of such a figure as this, but we scarcely better the matter by speaking, as critics are prone to do, of reality. Admitting the vagueness which afflicts all criticism of novels, let us hazard the opinion that for us at this moment the form of fiction most in vogue more often misses than secures the thing we seek. Whether we call it life or spirit, truth or reality, this, the essential thing, has moved off, or on, and refuses to be contained any longer in such ill-fitting vestments as we provide. – Modern Fiction

Woolf speaks of criticism as being vague rather than concrete. In her criticism within "Modern Fiction" of H.G. Wells for instance, she is vague in what is wrong with writings but focuses more on the abstract ideals for his fiction rather his work. Woolf's body of essays offer criticism on a variety and diverse collection of literature in her unsystematic method.

=== Woolf's analysis of Russian versus British literature ===
In "Modern Fiction", Woolf takes the time to analyse Anton Chekhov's "Gusev" and in general, how Russians write. Woolf spent time polishing translated Russian texts for a British audience with S.S.Kotelianskii which gave her perspectives she used to analyse the differences between British literature and Russian literature. Woolf says of Russian writers:

"In every great Russian writer we seem to discern the features of a saint, if sympathy for the sufferings for others, love towards them, endeavor to reach some goal worthy of the more exacting demands of the spirit constitute saintliness…The conclusions of the Russian mind, thus comprehensive and compassionate, are inevitably, perhaps, of the utmost sadness. More accurately indeed we might speak of the inconclusive-ness of the Russian mind. It is the sense that there is no answer, that if honestly examined life presents question after question which must be left to sound on and on after the story is over in hopeless interrogation that fills us with a deep, and finally it may be with a resentful, despair."

To Woolf, Russian writers see something entirely different in life than the British. In comparison to Russian writers and authors, Woolf says of British literature:

It is the saint in them [Russian writers] which confounds us with a feeling of our own irreligious triviality, and turns so many of our famous novels to tinsel and trickery...They are right perhaps; unquestionably they see further than we do and without our gross impediments of vision…The voice of protest is the voice of another and an ancient civilization which seems to have bred in us the instinct to enjoy and fight rather to suffer and understand. English fiction from Sterne to Meredith bears witness to our natural delight in humor and comedy, in the beauty of earth, in the activities of the intellect, and in the splendor of the body.

— Modern Fiction, Modern Fiction (essay)

Due to Woolf's work in polishing translations, she was able to see the differences between Russian and British authors. Yet she also knew that "from the comparison of two fictions so immeasurably far apart are futile save indeed as they flood us with a view of infinite possibilities of the art". Woolf's main purpose in comparing the two culturally different writers was to show the possibilities that modern fiction would be able to take in the future.

=== Woolf, writers and fiction ===
Woolf's "Modern Fiction" essay focuses on how writers should write or what she hopes for them to write. Woolf does not suggest a specific way to write. Instead, she wants writers to simply write what interests them in any way that they choose to write. Woolf suggests, "Any method is right, every method is right, that expresses what we wish to express, if we are writers; that brings us closer to the novelist's intention if we are readers". Woolf wanted writers to express themselves in such a way that it showed life as it should be seen not as "a series of gig lamps symmetrically arranged". She set out to inspire writers of modern fiction by calling for originality, criticizing those who focused on the unimportant things, and comparing the differences of cultural authors, all for the sake of fiction and literature.
