= Ivan Gorbunov-Posadov =

Russian and Soviet writer, poet, editor and publisher

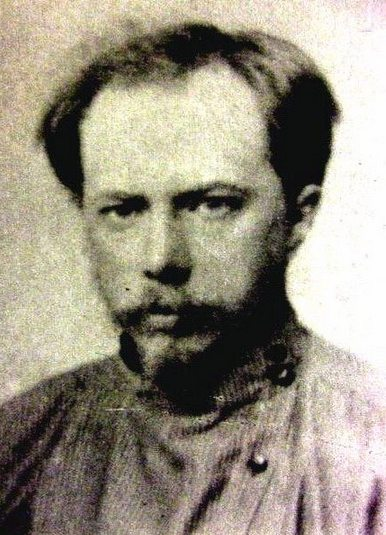
- Born: Ivan Gorbunov-Posadov; Иван Горбунов-Посадов; 16 April 1864; Kolpino, Saint Petersburg, Imperial Russia
- Died: 12 February 1940 (aged 75); Moscow, Soviet Union
- Occupations: writer, poet, editor, publisher

Ivan Ivanovich Gorbunov-Posadov (Russian: Иван Иванович Горбунов-Посадов, 16 [old style: 4] April 1864 - 12 February 1940) was a Russian, Soviet writer, poet, editor and publisher.

An avid Tolstoyan since 1884, Gorbunov-Posadov often served as an intermediary between Tolstoy and contemporary writers, notably Anton Chekhov. Throughout its history he was the key figure at the Posrednik publishing company which he became the head of in 1897.

An advocate of the so-called Free Upbringing (Свободное воспитание) theory, he edited the radical pedagogical journal Svobodnoye Vospitaniye (1909–1918), in which Nadezhda Krupskaya and Vladimir Bonch-Bruyevich were also involved, as well as the Library for Free Upbringing of Children, illustrated by Elisabeth Boehm. In 1907-1918 he published the magazine for children Mayak (Маяк, Beacon).

An ardent pacifist, Gorbunov-Posadov became noted for his passionate anti-war poems, some of which featured in Brothers, Come to Your Senses! 1900-1917 (Опомнитесь, братья!, 1917) and Songs for Brotherhood and Freedom. 1882-1913 (Песни братства и свободы, 1928). In the Soviet times he was credited mostly as a publisher of compilations, book series and illustrated almanacs for children.
