= The Order of Vladimir, Third Class =

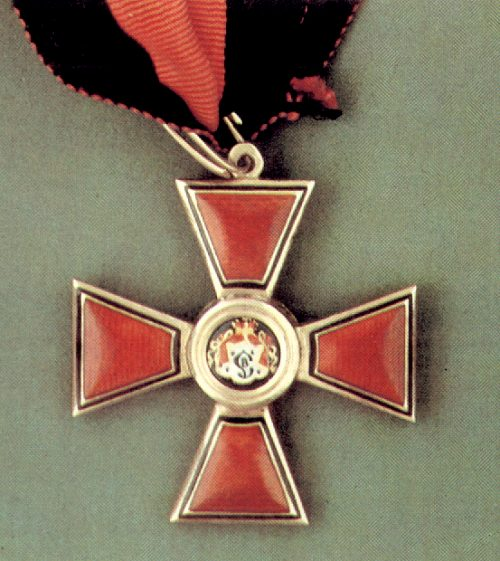
Order of Saint Vladimir, Third Class

The Order of St. Vladimir, Third Class (Russian: Владимир третьей степени; Vladimir tret'jej stepeni) is an unfinished play by Nikolai Gogol, which he worked on between 1832 and 1834.

== Structure ==
The work survives only in four fragments: "An Official's Morning" (Утро делового человека), "The Lawsuit" (Тяжба), "The Servants' Quarters" (Лакейская) and "Fragment" (Отрывок). Each fragment follows the official Barsukov, in search of his dream to receive a decoration, the Order of Vladimir.

=== Surviving scenes ===
The scene or subplot "The Lawsuit", concerns the lawsuit brought against Barsukov by his brother regarding the inheritance from their aunt. The scene is the base of the opera The Lawsuit.

According to Gogol's contemporaries, a lost scene showed Barsukov in front of a mirror in which he sees the decoration, finally believing he is the decoration.
