= Alexander Izmaylov (critic) =

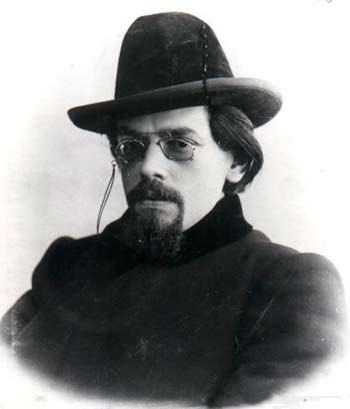
Alexander Izmaylov in 1900s

Alexander Alekseyevich Izmaylov (Russian: Алекса′ндр Алексе′евич Изма′йлов, 1873, Saint Peterburg, Russian Empire, – 1921, Petrograd, Soviet Russia) was a Russian literary critic, writer, poet and parodist.

A Saint Petersburg Theological Academy alumnus, Izmaylov was a versatile author, whose poems, short stories and a 1902 autobiographical novel V burse (In Seminary), all concerning Russia's religious life, earned him critical respect. As a literary critic, Izmaylov developed and mastered his own peculiar genre of impressionist critical etude. He published several essay collections (On the Verge and Twilight of Small Gods and New Idols, both 1910; Literary Olymp, 1911; Motley Flags, 1913), as well as Anton Chekhov's biography (Chekhov, 1916).

Izmaylov's popular set of poetic parodies (on Dmitry Merezhkovsky, Alexander Blok, Maxim Gorky and Konstantin Balmont, among others) came out in 1908 as Krivoye zerkalo (False Mirror).
