= Clementina Black =

British writer, feminist, and trade unionist (1853–1922)

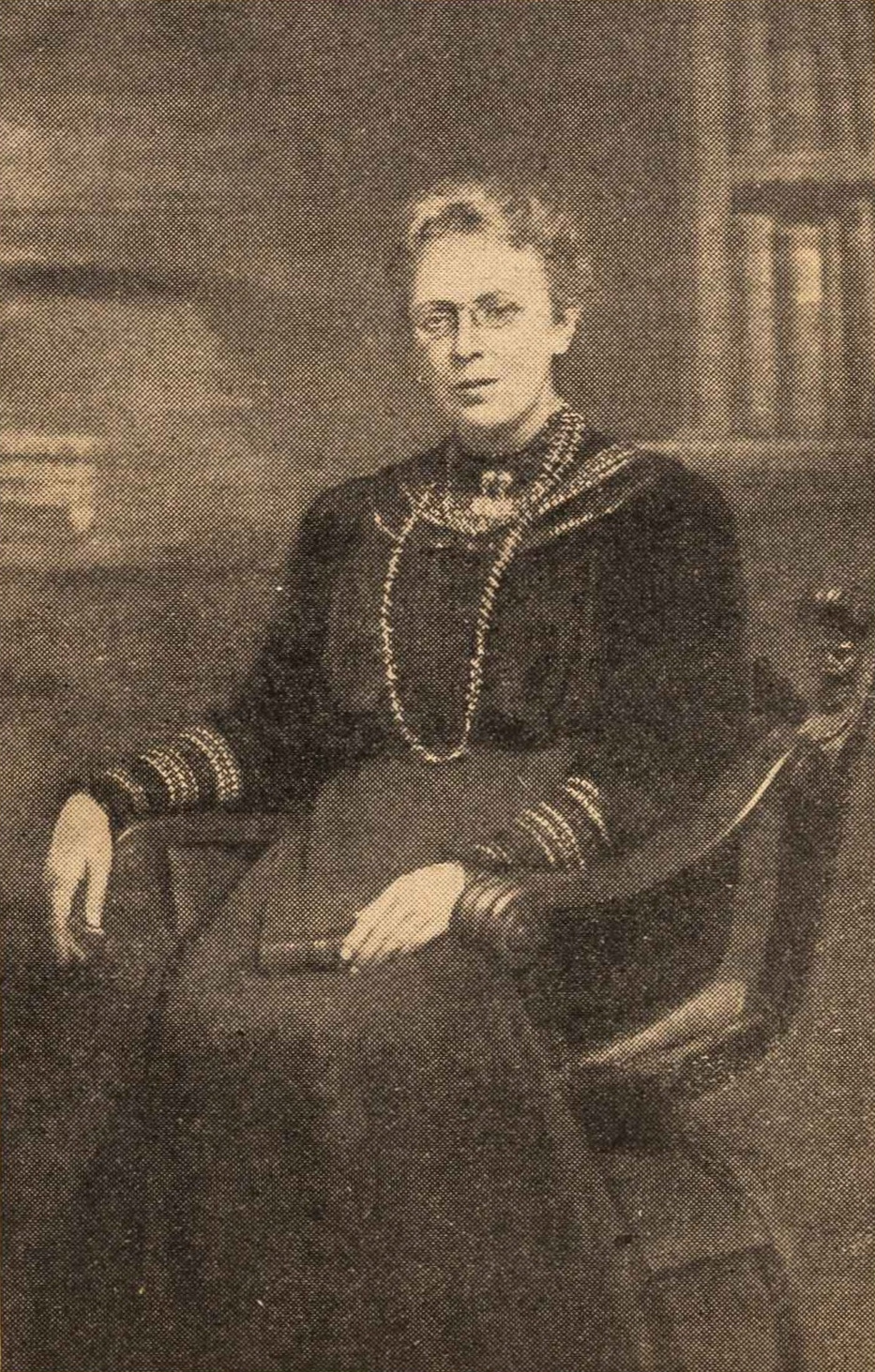
- Born: Clementina Maria Black; 27 July 1853; Brighton, England
- Died: 18 December 1922 (aged 69); Barnes, Surrey, England
- Resting place: East Sheen Cemetery, East Sheen
- Occupations: Writer, feminist, trade union activist and suffragist
- Relatives: Gertrude Massingham (niece)

Clementina Maria Black (27 July 1853 – 19 December 1922) was an English writer, feminist and pioneering trade unionist, closely connected with Marxist and Fabian socialists. She worked for women's rights at work and for women's suffrage.

== Early life ==
Clementina Black was born in Brighton, one of eight children of the solicitor, town clerk and coroner of Brighton, David Black (1817–1892), son of a naval architect to Czar Nicholas I of Russia, and his wife, Clara Maria Patten (1825–1875), daughter of a court portrait painter. Black was educated at home, at 58 Ship Street, Brighton mainly by her mother, and became fluent in French and German.

In 1875, Clementina's mother died of a rupture caused by lifting her invalid husband, who had lost the use of both legs. Clementina, as the eldest daughter, was left in charge of an invalid father and seven brothers and sisters, as well as doing a teaching job. Her siblings included the mathematician Arthur Black and the translator Constance Garnett. She and her sisters moved in the 1880s to Fitzroy Square in London, where she spent her time studying social problems, doing literary work, and lecturing on 18th-century literature.

== Politicisation ==
Black made the acquaintance of Marxist and Fabian socialists, such as Olive Shreiner, Dollie Radford, and Richard Garnett of the British Museum. She also became a friend of the Marx family, notably Eleanor Marx. She was involved over a long period with the problems of working-class women and the emerging trade union movement. In 1886, she became honorary secretary of the Women's Trade Union League and moved an equal-pay motion at the 1888 Trades Union Congress. In 1889, she helped to form the Women's Trade Union Association, which later became the Women's Industrial Council.

Black was among the organisers of the Bryant and May strike in 1888. She was also active in the Fabian Society. In 1895 she became editor of Women's Industrial News, the journal of the Women's Industrial Council, which encouraged middle-class women to research and report on the conditions of work for poorer women, and by 1914 had investigated almost 120 trades. In 1896 she began to campaign for a legal minimum wage as part of the Consumers League and credited as being involved in the Bryant & May match company industrial dispute where exploited women workers eventually took action.

By the early 1900s Black was also active in the burgeoning women's suffrage campaign, becoming the honorary secretary of the Women's Franchise Declaration Committee, which gathered a petition of 257,000 signatures. Black joined the National Union of Women's Suffrage Societies (NUWSS) and the London Society of Women's Suffrage. By 1912–1913, Black was acting editor of The Common Cause the "organ of the women's movement for reform", using her writing rather than direct action (unlike the militant suffragettes) to influence change.

== Writings ==
Black's first novel of seven, A Sussex Idyl [sic], was published in 1877. An Agitator (1894) concerned a socialist strike leader. It was described by Eleanor Marx as "a realistic account of the British working-class movement". Her others were non-political, the last, The Linleys of Bath (1911), being among the most successful.

Black's two political works, Sweated Industry and the Minimum Wage (1907) and Makers of our Clothes: a Case for Trade Boards (jointly with C. Meyer, 1909) have been called "powerful works of propaganda".

=== Bibliography ===
Details from the British Library catalogue.

- A Sussex Idyl (novel, London: Samuel Tinsley, 1877)
- Orlando (novel, London: Smith, Elder & Co., 1879)
- Mericas and other stories (London: W. Satchell & Co., 1880)
- Miss Falkland and other stories (London: Lawrence & Bullen, 1892)
- An Agitator (London: Bliss, Sands & Co., 1894)
- With Stephen N. Fox. The Truck Acts: what they do, and what they ought to do (London: Women's Trade Union Association, 1894)
- The Princess Désirée (London: Longmans, 1896)
- The Pursuit of Camilla (London: Pearson, 1899)
- Frederick Walker (London: Duckworth & Co.; New York: E. P. Dutton & Co., 1902)
- Kindergarten Plays (verse, London: R. B. Johnson, 1903)
- Sweated Industry and the Minimum Wage (London: Duckworth, 1907)
- Caroline (London, John Murray, 1908)
- A Case for Trade Boards (1909)
- With Adele Meier. Makers of our Clothes: a case for trade boards. Being the results of a year's investigation into the work of women in London in the tailoring, dressmaking, and underclothing trades (London: Duckworth, 1909)
- The Linleys of Bath (London: Secker, 1911)
- Married Women's Work, with others from the Women's Industrial Council (London: G. Bell & Sons, 1915)
- A New Way of Housekeeping (London: Collins, 1918)

== Personal details ==
Clementina Black remained unmarried. She took into her home her niece Gertrude Speedwell, after the girl's father, Clementina's brother Arthur, had murdered his wife and son, then committed suicide. She died at her home in Barnes, Surrey on 19 December 1922 and was buried at East Sheen Cemetery, London. The biblical inscription on her grave from Phillipians 4:8 read:

Finally brethren, whatsoever things are true, whatsoever things are honest, whatsoever things are just, whatsoever things are pure, whatsoever things are lovely, whatsoever things are of good report; if there be any virtue and if there be any praise, think on these things.
