= Angel Bogdanovich =

Angel Ivanovich Bogdanovich
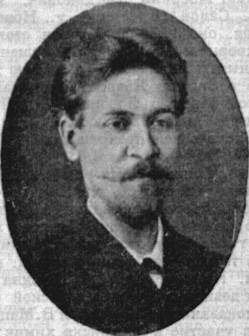
- Born: Ангел Иванович Богданович; October 14, 1860; Gorodok, Vitebsk Governorate, Russian Empire (now Haradok, Belarus)
- Died: April 6, 1907 (aged 46); Saint Petersburg, Russian Empire
- Occupations: literary critic, editor political activist
- Years active: 1880s – 1907
- Spouse: Tatyana Bogdanovich (1872-1942)

Angel Ivanovich Bogdanovich (Russian: А́нгел Ива́нович Богдано́вич, October 14 [O.S. October 2] 1860 – April 6 [O.S. March 24] 1907) was a Russian literary critic, publicist and social activist, originally a narodnik, later an active member of the Legal Marxists' political group.

== Biography ==
Angel Bogdanovich was born in Haradok, in the Gorodoksky Uyezd of the Vitebsk Governorate of the Russian Empire (present-day Belarus), an heir to a noble family of the Polish and Lithuanian origins. His younger brother was a famous Polish geologist, an expert in mining geology and physical geography Karol Bohdanowicz. In 1880 he enrolled into the Kiev University. As a student of the medical faculty, he became a member of a Narodnik political circle, was expelled and got deported to the Nizny Novgorod governorate. There he became friends with Vladimir Korolenko and started contributing to several Privolzhye journals. In 1887 he moved to Kazan, there he edited the Volzhsky Vesnik newspaper. In 1893, now a Saint Petersburg resident, he founded there Narodnoye Pravo (People's Right) group and issued its political program in a brochure called Nasushchny Vopros (A Vital Question, 1894).

In the mid-1890s Bogdanovich drifted away from Narodniks and became a member of the Legal Marxists group. In the early 1890s Bogdanovich regularly contributed to Russkoye Bogatstvo, in 1894-1906 was a co-editor of and a key figure in Mir Bozhiy. In 1906 Mir Bozhiy was closed but re-emerged as Sovremenny Mir (Modern World) and for a year Bogdanovich was its editor.

Angel Bogdanovich died in Saint Petersburg on April 6, 1907.
