= Adolf Marks =

German publisher (1838–1904)

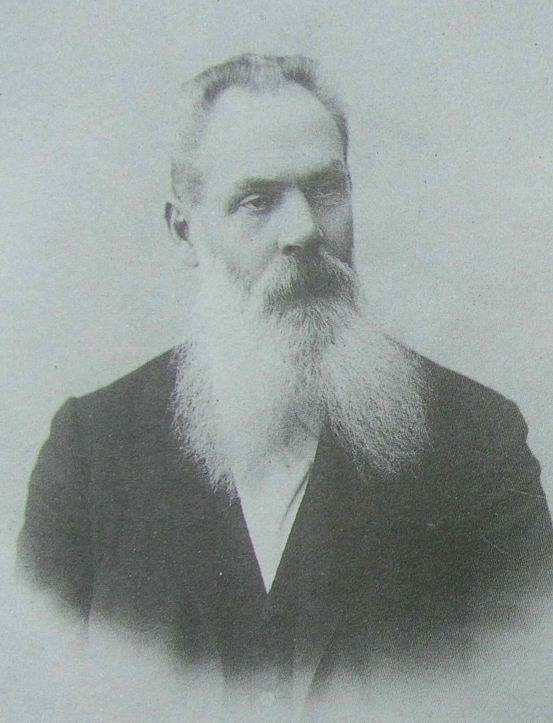
Portrait by Karl Bulla, 1900

Adolf Fyodorovich Marx (Note: Also spelled Marcks or Marks.) (Russian: Адо́льф Фёдорович Маркс; 2 February 1838 – 4 November [O.S. 22 October] 1904) was German publisher active in Russia. He is best known for the weekly journal Niva. He later obtained Russian citizenship.

== Life ==
Marx was born in Stettin, Kingdom of Prussia. He was the son of Friedrich Marx, a maker of tower clocks. After finishing his education, he went to work in a bookstore, and in 1859 moved to the Russian Empire to take jobs in the book trade, first with F. A. Bietepage and I. K. Kalugin to deal with their German books, and then in the foreign department of Moritz Wolf's bookstore, "one of the best bookshops in St. Petersburg." After a brief period as chief editor for German and French correspondence for the Great Russian Railway Company, he decided to open his own publishing company in St. Petersburg in 1869.

He published books on literature, art, and history, and from 1870 Niva, the weekly journal for which he is best known. The office of the publishing house was at 22 Malaya Morskaya Street and its printing house at 29 Izmaylovsky Avenue. After the death of Marx the publishing house was reorganized as the A. F. Marx Publishing and Printing Joint-Stock Company. In 1897, he was awarded a title of nobility. He died in 1904 and was buried in the cemetery of Novodevichy Monastery.

== Sources ==
- "Маркс, Адольф Федорович" . Brockhaus and Efron Encyclopedic Dictionary (in Russian). 1906.
