= Kukin =

Kukin, feminine: Kukina is a Russian surname.

- Fyodor Kukin
- Marina Kukina
- Viktor Kukin
- Yuri Kukin

== Fictional characters ==
- Ivan Petrovich Kukin, in the short story The Darling by Russian writer Anton Chekhov
