= Ducat (disambiguation) =

A ducat is a Middle Ages European trade coin.

Ducat may also refer to:

- Ducat (surname)
- Ducat, Ohio, US, an unincorporated community
- DUCAT, an internet service provider in Kazakhstan
- Ducat Auction House, founded by Leonid Komskyi
- Ducats, an in-game internet currency for Playchess
- Orokin Ducats, an in-game currency in Warframe

== See also ==
- Dukat (disambiguation)
- Ducato
- Ducati (disambiguation)
