= Dukat =

Dukat may refer to:

- Dukat (currency), or ducat, a gold coin produced in Europe over many centuries
- Dukat (Star Trek), a character from Star Trek: Deep Space Nine
- Sandy Dukat (born 1972), American Paralympic athlete
- Dukat (company), a Croatian food and dairy processing company

== Places ==
- Dukat, Albania, a village
- Dukat (Bosilegrad), a village in Serbia
- Dukat (Gadžin Han), a village in Serbia
- Dukat (mountain), a mountain in Serbia that is the source of the Pčinja River
- Dukat, Russia, an urban-type settlement in Omsukchansky District, Magadan Oblast, Russia
- Dukat mine, Russia

== See also ==
- Dukhat, a character from Babylon 5
- Ducat (disambiguation)
