= Yevgenia Uvarkina =

Russian businesswoman and politician

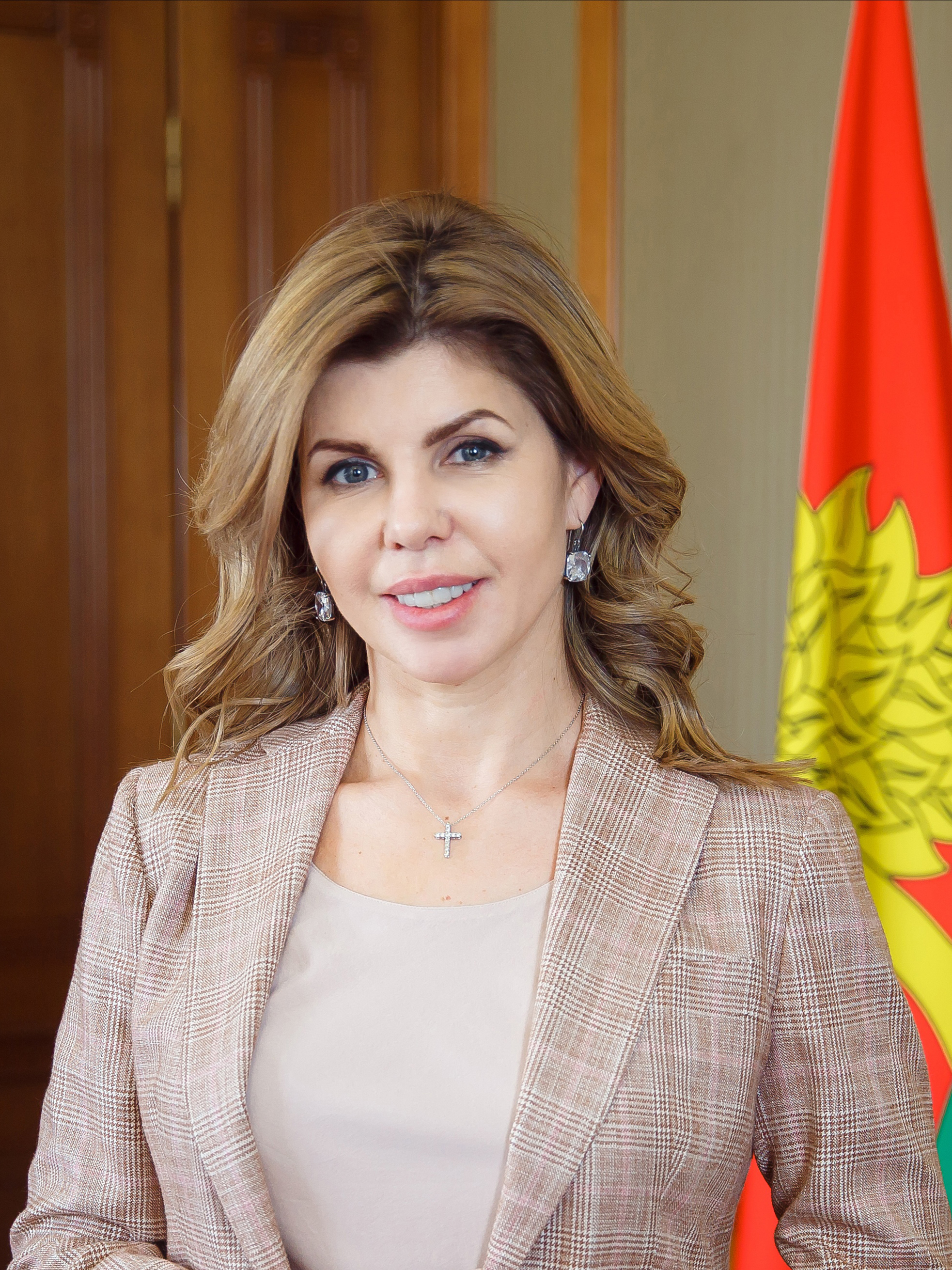
Uvarkina in 2020

Yevgenia Yurievna Uvarkina (Russian: Евгения Юрьевна Уваркина; born May 30, 1974) is a Russian businesswoman and politician. She has been serving as the Mayor of Lipetsk since April 1, 2019.

Born on May 30, 1974, in the urban-type settlement Omsukchan, Omsukchansky District of Magadan Oblast, Soviet Union. In 1977, she moved to Lipetsk with her family. After school, she entered the Lipetsk Ecology and Humanities Institute, specializing in economics, and graduated in 1996.

Holds the position of Chairman of the Board of Directors of the Association of Agricultural Producers of the Lipetsk Oblast. Uvarkina joined the Civic Chamber of the Russian Federation in March 2017, where she was Chairman of the Commission for the Development of the Agro-Industrial Complex and Rural Territories.

On March 29, 2019, the head of the Lipetsk administration, Sergei Ivanov, appointed Uvarkina as first deputy. Before the elections, the new mayor of the Lipetsk council acts as head. In the post of head of Lipetsk was involved in the antisemitic scandal.

She is married to Gennady Uvarkin with six children: two sons and four daughters.
