= Dukat, Russia =

Dukat Дукат
- Urban-type settlement
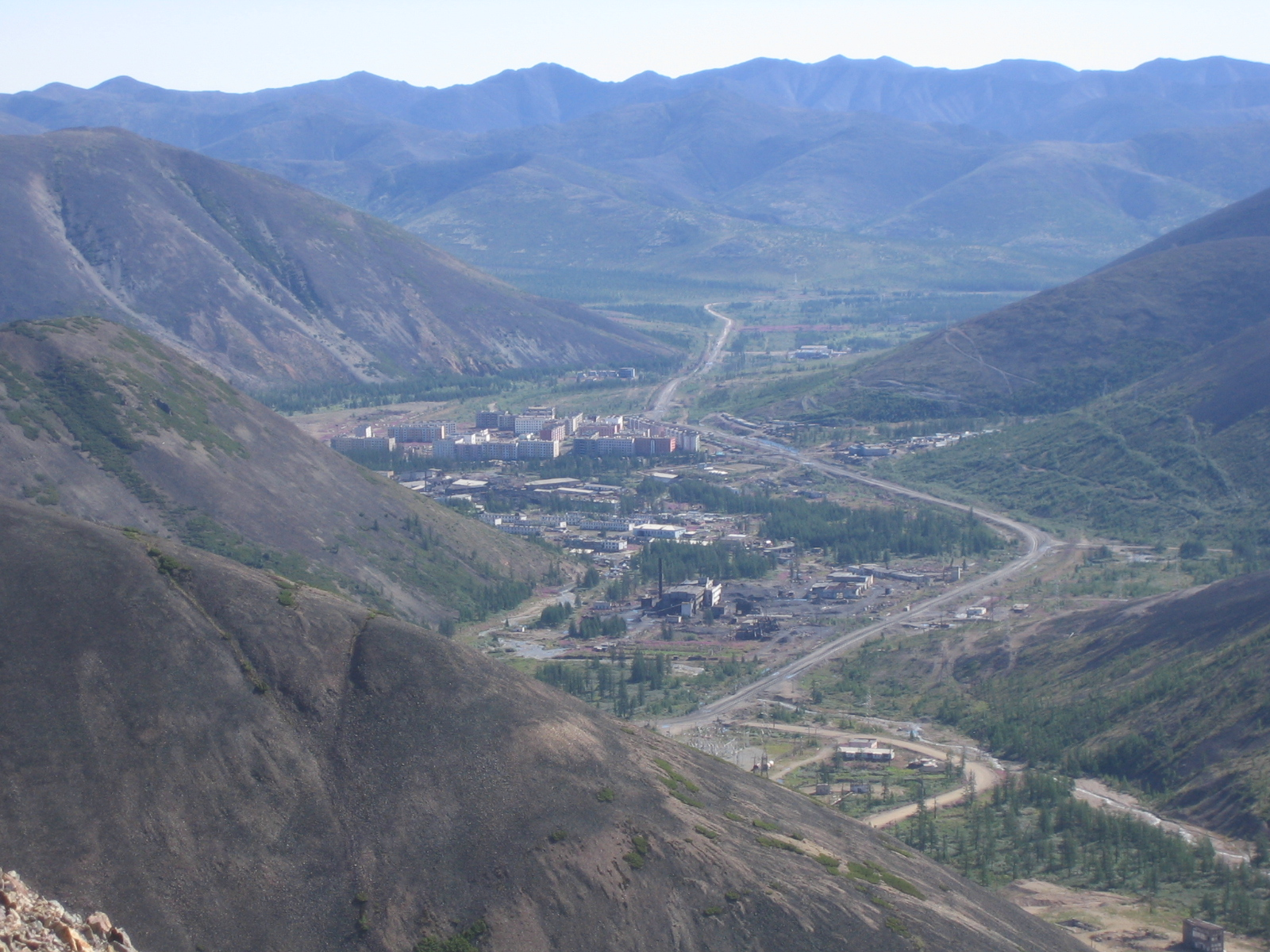
- View of Dukat
- Interactive map of Dukat
- Location of Dukat Dukat (Magadan Oblast)
- Coordinates: 62°34′28.4″N 155°23′08.0″E
- Country: Russia
- Federal subject: Magadan Oblast
- Administrative district: Omsukchansky District
- Elevation: 857 m (2,812 ft)

Population (2010 Census)
  - Total: 1,351
  - Estimate (1 January 2017): 1,315 (−2.7%)
- Time zone: UTC+11 (MSK+8)
- Postal code: 686417
- OKTMO ID: 44704000056

Dukat (Russian: Дукат) is an urban locality (an urban-type settlement) in the Omsukchansky District of Magadan Oblast, Russia, located 595 kilometers (370 mi) north of Magadan. Population: 1,351 (2010 census); 1,287 (2002 census); 6,945 (1989 Soviet census).

== History ==
In the mid of the 1960s, geologists from Omsukchan discovered a rich ore deposit of silver; and named the settlement of Dukat, founded in 1968, after the ducat, an old trade coin used in Europe. The status of urban-type settlement was assigned by the decision of the Magadan Regional Executive Committee of February 19, 1976.

== Geography ==
Dukat is located in a valley between two mountains of the Omsukchan Range, Kolyma Highlands, 27 km west of Omsukchan, the raion's seat and the nearest populated place. It is 30 km from Omsukchan Airport and 45 from the ghost town of Galimy.

== Economy ==
The town is known for its gold mine, one of the largest in Russia, located few km west of the town.

== Gallery ==
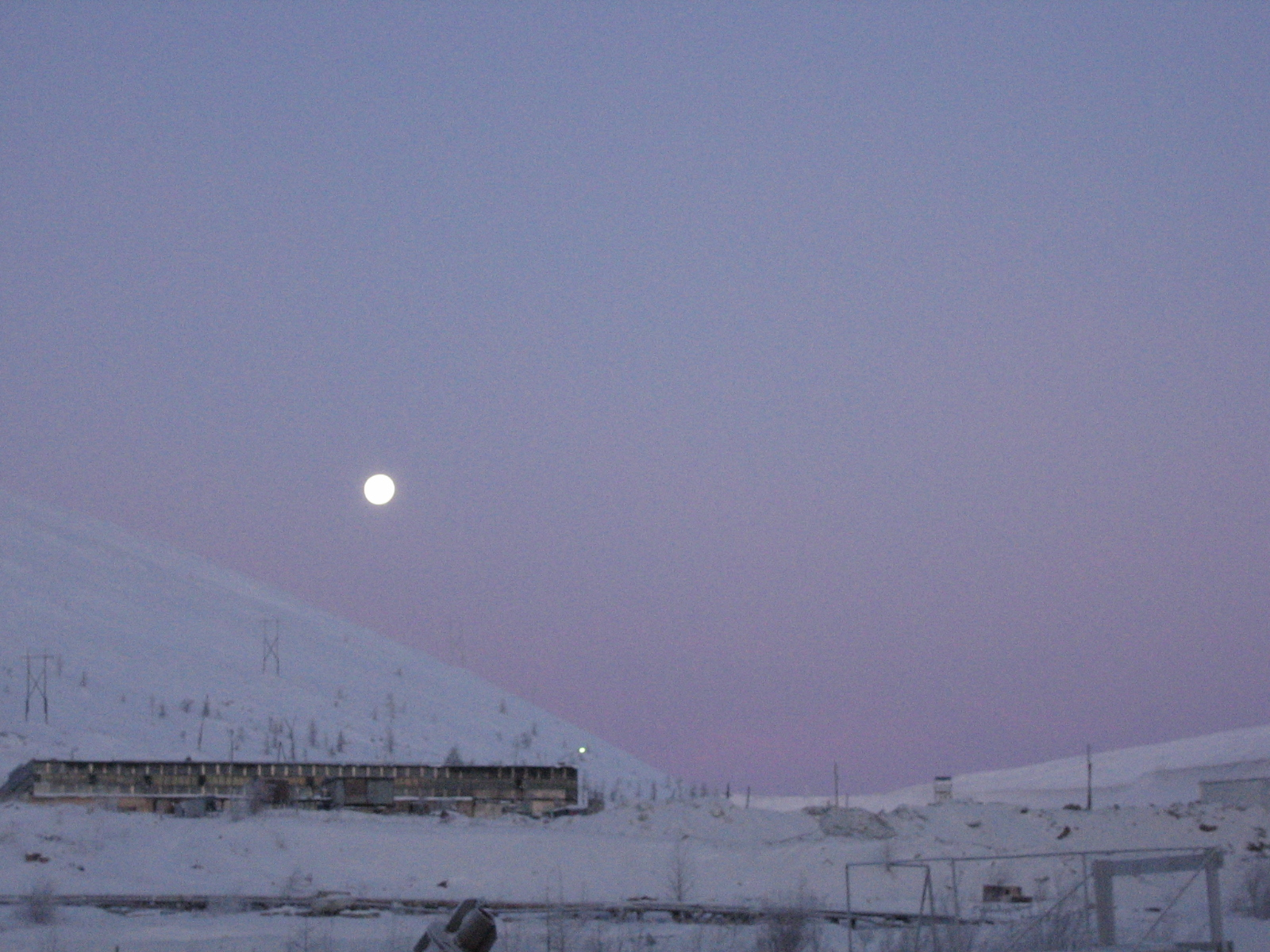
The town in a winter morning

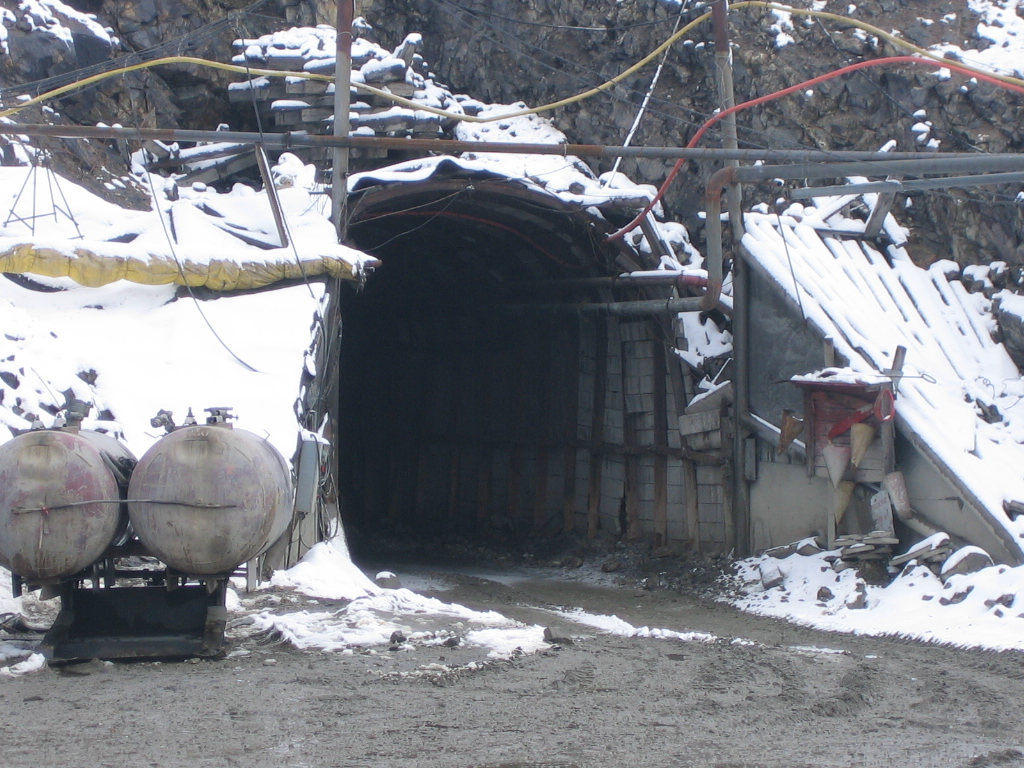
Gallery 22 of the Dukat Mine

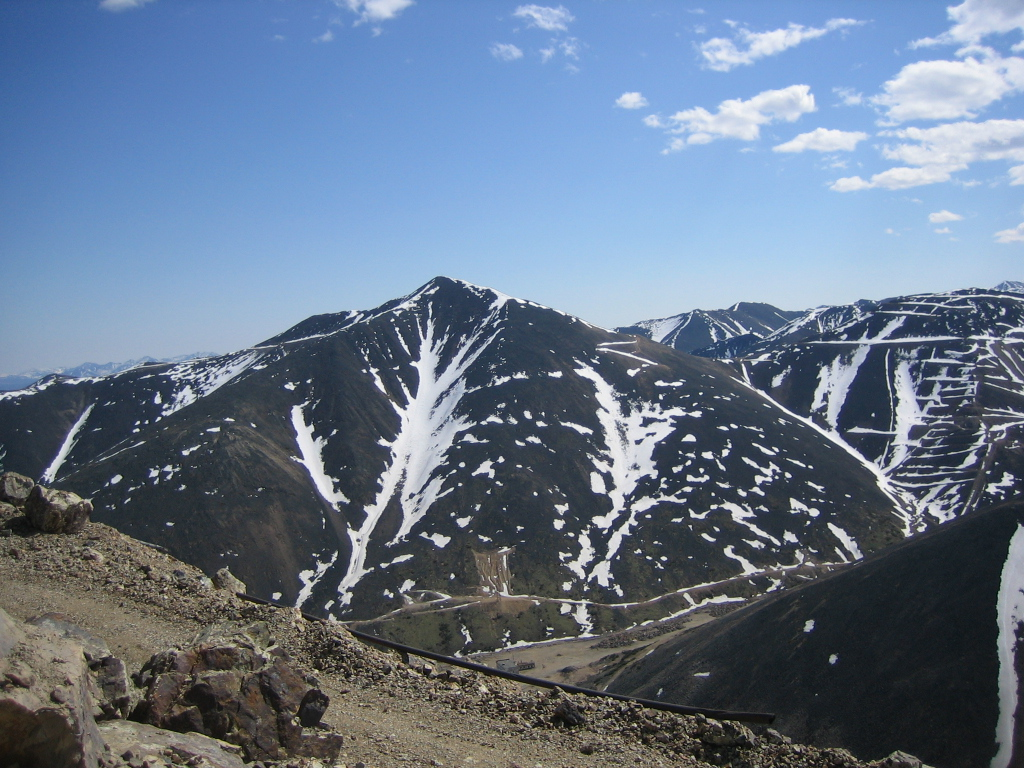
View from the Dukat Mine

== See also ==
- Omsukchan
- List of urban localities in the Russian Far East
