= Sediq Afghan =

Afghan mathematician

Muhammad Sediq Afghan صدیق افغان

ریاضی فلسفی جهان

Personal details
- Born: March 20, 1958 (age 68) Kabul, Kingdom of Afghanistan
- Education: Lipetsk State Pedagogical University
- Website: sediqafghan.com

Sediq Afghan (Dari: صدیق افغان ) is an Afghan political activist. He is the founder and head of the World Philosophical Math Research Center in Kabul, Afghanistan. He had a prominent role in protests in Kabul about Afghanistan- and Islam-related issues, including an anti-American protest in 2003, a hunger strike to protest beatings of journalists by Afghan security officers in 2006, and another one to protest the 2008 Danish Muhammad cartoons.

Sediq Afghan appears on the Russian propaganda TV shows on a regular basis, making predictions (which he claims are based on his mathematical research) of Russia winning the war and of various global catastrophic events. He claims various achievements that fail fact checks, such as: “He is one of the greatest geniuses of the world and is listed by the UN as a UNESCO heritage of humankind”.
