= House of Drevitsky =

- Дом Древицкого
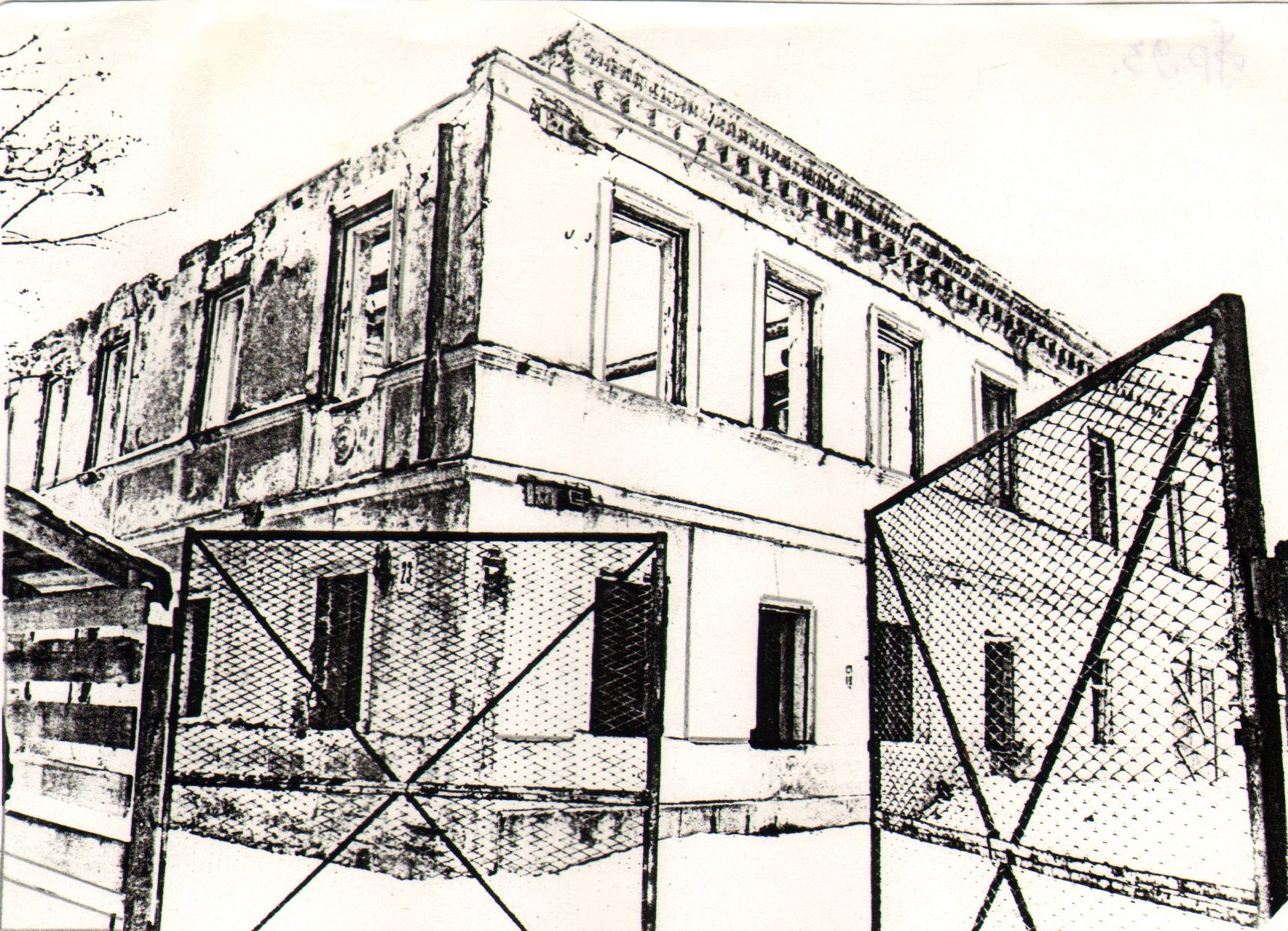
- 2001
- Interactive map of the House of Drevitsky area

General information
- Location: Taganrog, Street of Frunze, 23
- Coordinates: 47°12′42″N 38°55′53″E
- Construction started: 1840
- Completed: 1840
- Demolished: 2002

The House of Drevitsky (Russian: Дом Древицкого) is an ancient mansion in Taganrog (Street of Frunze, 23), a monument of architecture of the 1840s. Treated architecture monuments, is among objects of cultural heritage of the Russian Federation under a code No.6101267000.

== History and description ==
The two-storeyed mansion was built in the style of neoclassicism. On a facade in both floors on 6 windows. In Interflora space under windows, there were bas-reliefs with the image of the lion's heads. Rooms were equipped with graceful fireplaces. Ceilings were decorated by a molding.

The mansion was built in 1840. Owners: 1873 — the collegiate registrar F. Serebryakov, 1880 — a collegiate assessor of Yakovenko, 1890 — the Turkish merchant of N. Samar-Ogla, 1898 — N. K. Mumulov (opened tobacco factory in the building), from 1906 to 1912 — the managing director of the Taganrog branch of the Russian steamship society I. Ya. Drevitsky. From 1912 to 1925 the mansion belonged to Drevitsky's successors.

In 1925 the house was nationalized and divided into communal flats. Without due leaving the house decayed and by the end of the 1980s residents were moved out, and the house stayed in critical condition. In 1991 the house was transferred to the Taganrog fish processing plant (director N. I. Demyanenko). Local inhabitants called the ruined remains of the house "count ruins". In March 2002 the plans to build on the place of the House of Drevitsky a new house with the preservation of a historic facade was declared by the LLC Ekspert-Yug company.

== House destruction ==
Finally, Drevitsky's house was destroyed in 2002. On the place of the house of Levitsky, the builder LLC Vesta-D (director V. P. Dashchenko) from 2005 to 2007 built a four-storeyed apartment house provocatively of poor exterior. As permission to works on reconstruction (construction) of an object of cultural heritage by the Ministry of Culture of the area was not given, the builder was found guilty of commission of an administrative offense and to it in November 2007 was appointed punishments in the form of a penalty.
