= Betulinsky house =

Betulinsky House
- Дом Бетулинского (Russian)
- Location within Russia
- 47.2133°N 38.930°E
- Location: Lermontovsky Lane, 11, Taganrog, Rostov oblast Russia

History
- Built: 1872

Site notes
- Owner: provincial secretary G. E. Betulinsky

Betulinsky House (Russian:Дом Бетулинского) is two-story building with a balcony, which is located at Lermontovsky Lane, 11 in Taganrog, Rostov Region. The building was built in the second half of the 19th century by Grigory Efimovich Betulinsky.

== History ==
The Betulinsky family owned a house along Lermontovsky Lane, 11, from 1872 (the time of construction) to the end of the 19th century. Grigory Efimovich Betulinsky was provincial secretary. It is known that they with his wife Maria Konstantinovna had a daughter, Natalya, who was born on 10 August 1885.

The next owner of the house was the wife of the merchant Maria Yurdi. Her husband was the Greek consul.

Another owner of the house was Major-General Krizhanovsky Alexander Ivanovich. He was the owner of the house until the 1910s. After him, the house was owned by the wife of state counselor Valentina Vladimirovna Fedorova.

Next to it was a one-storey house with 6 windows, built by the wife of collegiate assessor P.M. Rabotina. The house under No. 13 was built in the 1910s. Its owner was a college registrar Otto Ottovich Herman. The property was valued at 3,200 rubles.
