= House of Petrov =

- Дом Петрова (Russian)
- Interactive map of the House of Petrov area

General information
- Location: Taganrog, Petrovskaya street, 36
- Coordinates: 55°46′10″N 37°35′51″E

The House of Petrov (Russian: Дом Петрова) is a building down the street Petrovsky, 36 in the city of Taganrog of the Rostov Oblast.

== History ==
The house down the street of Petrov, 36 was built at the end of the 1850s and as of 1859, it belonged to the titular counselor Mikhail Petrov and his wife Elena for whom it was constructed. Mikhail Petrov was a member of the board of trustees on prisons, consisted in committee on a construction of pavements and held a position of the titular counselor. In 1861 together with Firsov and Trusov, it was recognized as the city architect. In 1864 Mikhail Petrov was given the assignment and became the chief builder on a construction of Mitrofaniyevsky church. He was engaged in the construction of the building for a commercial meeting in which the branch of teacher training college down the street Petrovsky, 42 began to work later. As of 1873 also Mikhail Petrov, however, already in a rank of a collegiate assessor appeared the owner.

In 1880 the real estate carried over the wife of the collegiate registrar Sofya Talalayeva. Her husband nobleman Nikolay Aleksandrovich was the provincial secretary. In its property, many were at home down the street Petrovsky which settled down from post department to Dvortsovy Lane. In Talalayev' family, there were several children: Alexander, Dmitry, Fedor, and Vera. In 1910 the port technician, the outdoor adviser Alexey Andreevich Ioganson had rooms. Sofya Talalayeva stopped being the owner of the house after 1915. The office employee E. L. Sergienko was the new owner in 1917 — 1925.

== Description ==
The house down the street Petrovsky, 36, represents a one-story structure with the mezzanine. The building was reconstructed in comparison with the initial version. In documents at the construction of the house, it appeared that the wooden house with a brick facing and the stone shed is located at this address. On the right side of the house, the porch is made.
