= Goltsovoye mine =

Silver mine in Russia

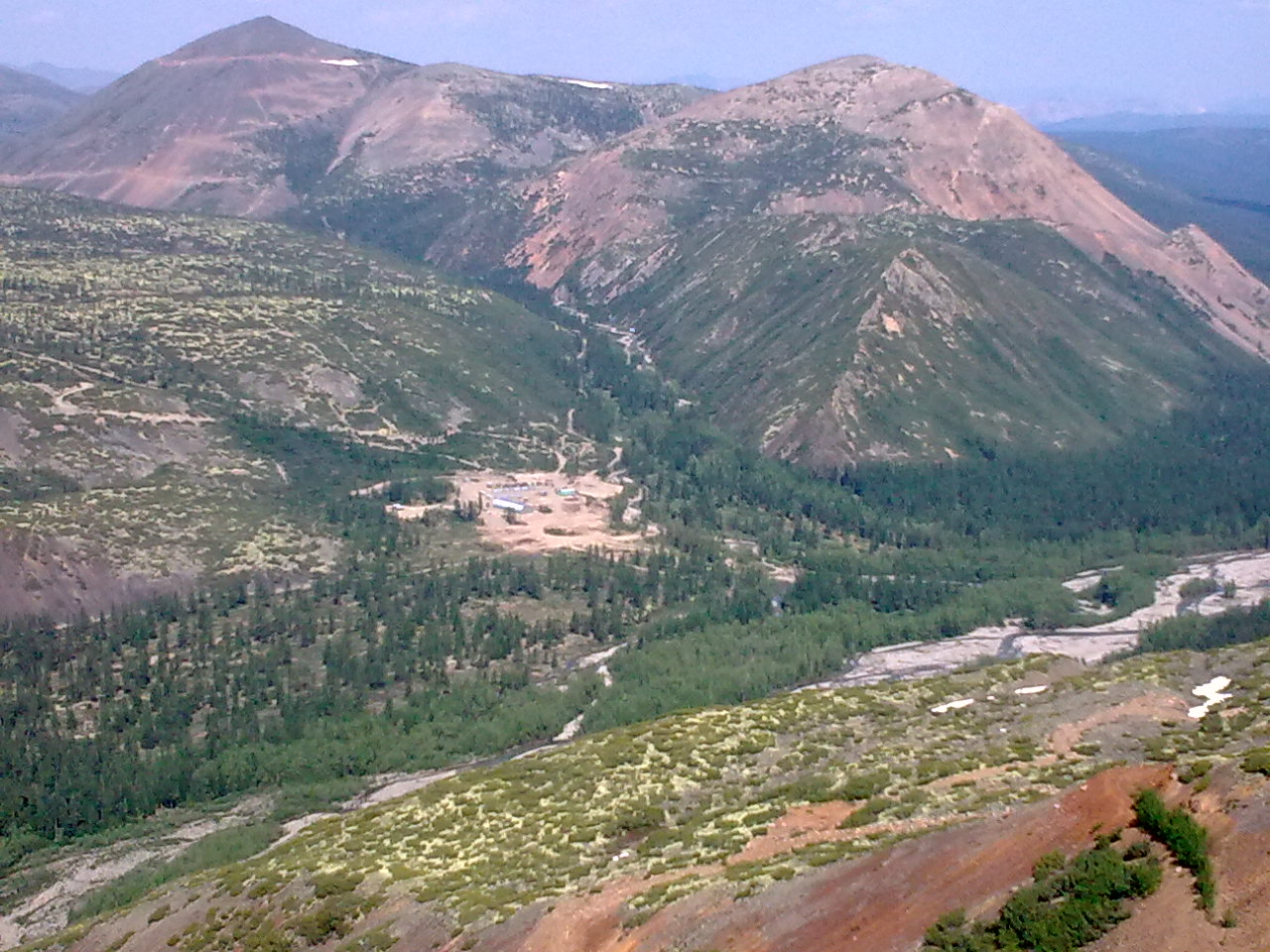

- Location in Magadan Oblast
- Location: Kolyma Mountains, Magadan Oblast, Russia; 62°0′34″N 155°39′13″E
- Products: Silver

The Goltsovoye mine is one of the largest silver mines in Russia and in the world. The mine is located to the southeast of Omsukchan in Omsukchan District, Magadan Oblast, Siberia. The mine has estimated reserves of 46.9 million oz of silver.
