= Omsukchan =

Omsukchan Омсукча́н
- Urban-type settlement
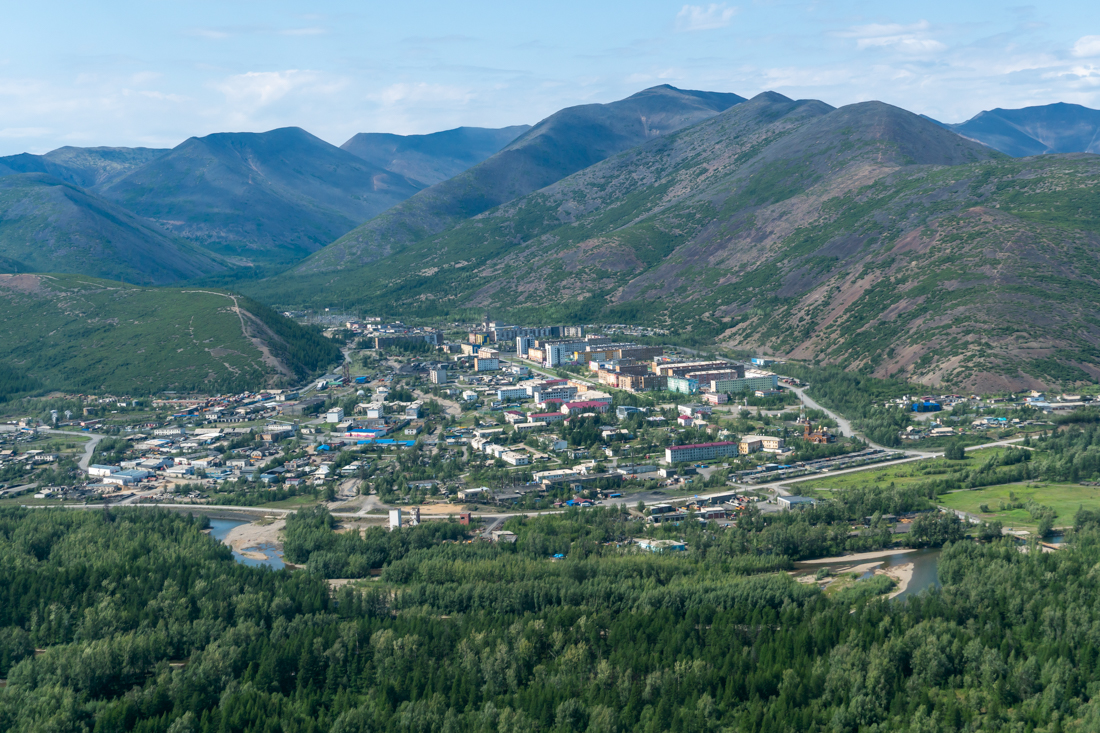
- View of Omsukchan

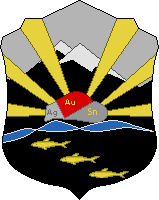
- Coat of arms
- Interactive map of Omsukchan
- Location of Omsukchan Omsukchan (Magadan Oblast)
- Coordinates: 62°30′40.6″N 155°47′01.4″E
- Country: Russia
- Federal subject: Magadan Oblast
- Administrative district: Omsukchansky District
- Founded: 1930

Population (2010 Census)
  - Total: 4,157
  - Estimate (1 January 2017): 3,763 (−9.5%)
- Time zone: UTC+11 (MSK+8)
- Postal code: 686410
- OKTMO ID: 44704000051

Omsukchan (Russian: Омсукча́н) is an urban locality (an urban-type settlement) and the administrative center of Omsukchansky District of Magadan Oblast, Russia, located 576 kilometers (358 mi) north of Magadan. Population: 3,493 (2021 census); 4,157 (2010 census); 4,529 (2002 census); 9,873 (1989 Soviet census).

== History ==
Omsukchan was founded in the 1930s after natural resources were discovered in the region. It was granted urban-type settlement status in 1953.

The settlement's name comes from Omchikan, which means "little marsh" in the Even language.

== Geography ==
Omsukchan is a mountain town that lies on the western shore of the Sugoy River, a tributary of Kolyma River. It is 27 km east of Dukat, the only other town in the raion, and 22 km north of the ghost town of Galimy. The Omsukchan Range, the highest ridge of the Kolyma Mountains, rises to the west and northwest of the town.

== Economy ==
The economy is based on the extraction of gold, silver and coal.

== Transport ==
Omsukchan has a 250 km road to the R504 Kolyma Highway and has the Omsukchan Airport. There are regular bus and flight connections to Magadan.

The Anadyr Highway is under construction east from Omsukchan towards Anadyr.

== Climate ==
Omsukchan has a subarctic climate, with average temperatures ranging from −29.6 °C (−21.3 °F) in January to +13.4 °C (56.1 °F) in July.

Climate data for Omsukchan
Month	Jan	Feb	Mar	Apr	May	Jun	Jul	Aug	Sep	Oct	Nov	Dec	Year
Daily mean °C (°F)	−29.6 (−21.3)	−28.5 (−19.3)	−22.1 (−7.8)	−12.7 (9.1)	−3.3 (26.1)	8.5 (47.3)	13.4 (56.1)	9.3 (48.7)	−1.5 (29.3)	−11.1 (12.0)	−22.8 (−9.0)	−29.3 (−20.7)	−10.5 (13.1)
Source: NASA RETScreen Database

Historical population
Year	Pop.	±%
1959	2,395	—
1970	4,154	+73.4%
1979	7,308	+75.9%
1989	9,873	+35.1%
2002	4,529	−54.1%
2010	4,157	−8.2%
2021	3,493	−16.0%
Source: Census data

== See also ==
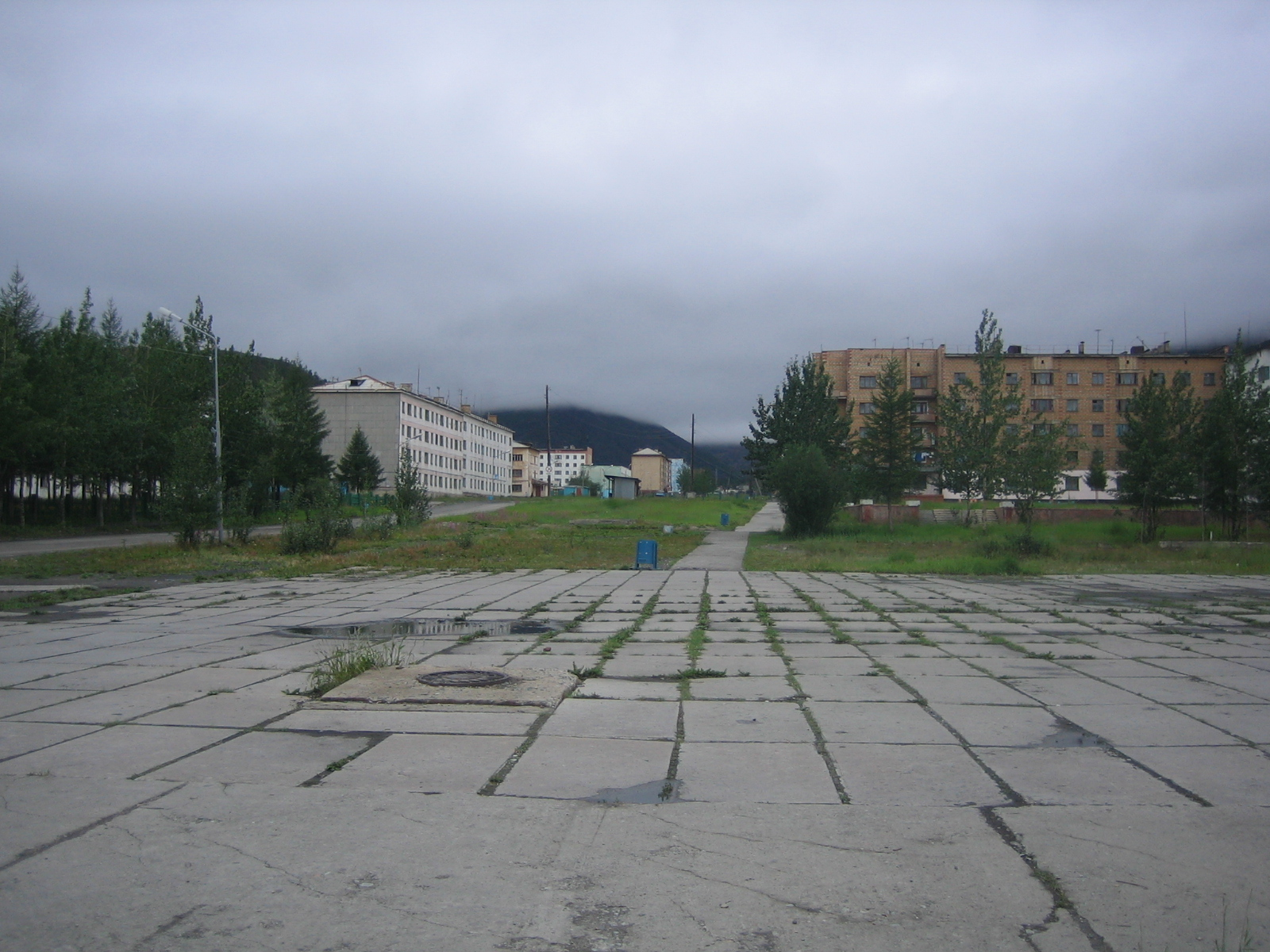
Town's central square

- Dukat
- Goltsovoye mine
- List of urban localities in the Russian Far East

== Notable residents ==
- Ilya Moseychuk (born 2000), football player
- Yevgenia Uvarkina (born 1974), businesswoman and politician
