= Ducato =

Ducato can refer to:

- the Italian word for a duchy, derived from the Latin ducatus
- the former coin ducat, called after the dogal (i.e. 'ducal') state of Venice
- a family name, and things named after its members, notably Danielducato after the Italian (Sardinian) amateur astronomer Daniela Ducato
- Fiat Ducato, a model of van
- Lefkada, a Greek island in the Ionian Sea also called "Ducato"

== See also ==
- Cape Ducato (disambiguation)
- Ducati (disambiguation)
- Ducat (disambiguation)
