= Lipetsk State Technical University =

- Липецкий государственный технический университет
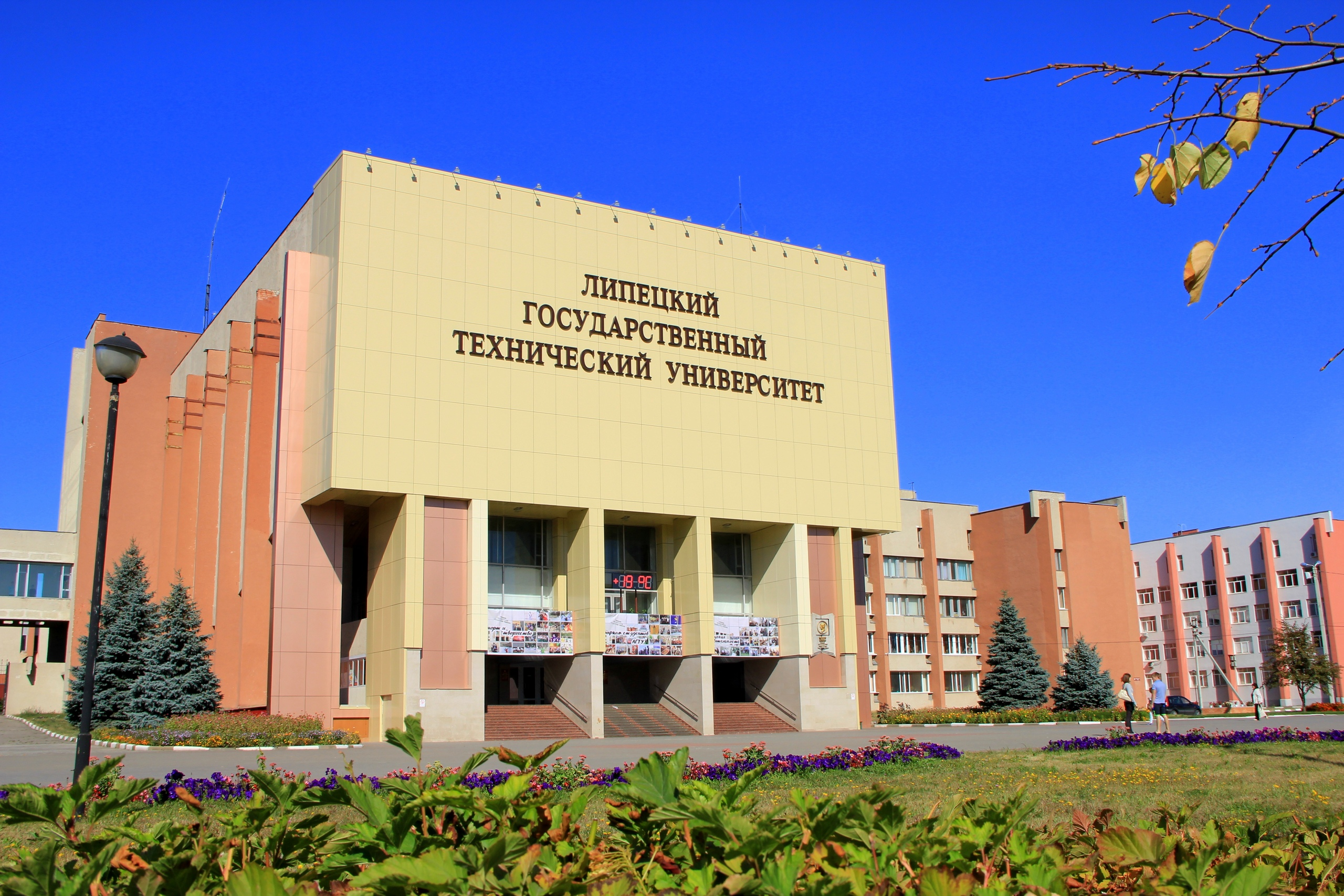
- Type: Public
- Established: 1 November 1956
- Location: Lipetsk, Russia; 52°36′06″N 39°30′16″E
- Campus: Urban
- Nickname: LGTU (Russian: ЛГТУ)
- Website: www.stu.lipetsk.ru

Lipetsk State Technical University (Russian: Федеральное государственное бюджетное образовательное учреждение высшего образования «Липецкий государственный технический университет») is a higher education institution in the city of Lipetsk, Russia.

== History ==
It was founded in 1956 as the evening faculty of the Tula Mechanical Institute by Order No. 869 of the Minister of Higher Education of the USSR dated November 1, 1956. At the time, it was the first and only technical university in the Lipetsk Oblast. Initially, the faculty offered two specializations:

- Mechanical Engineering Technology, Metal-Cutting Machines and Tools;
- Foundry Machines and Technology.

Simultaneously with the faculty's founding, departments of Higher Mathematics, Physics, and Chemistry were established.

In 1959, the evening faculty was transformed into the Lipetsk Evening Faculty of MISiS, and in 1966, into the Lipetsk branch of MISiS (based on Order No. 471 of the Minister of Higher and Secondary Specialized Education of the USSR dated December 16, 1966). During this time, new departments of Ferrous Metallurgy and Mechanical Engineering Technology were established.

In 1973, the Lipetsk Polytechnic Institute was established on the basis of the Lipetsk branch of MISiS by Resolution No. 86 of the Council of Ministers of the Soviet Union dated January 27, 1972, and Order No. 399 of the USSR Minister of Higher and Secondary Specialized Education dated May 15, 1972.

In the late 1980s, in connection with the humanization of technical education, the departments of culture and psychology were created.

In 1991, an eighth faculty, Business and Management (now the Faculty of Economics) was established. Construction of a new educational and laboratory building was also completed at that time.

In 1994, the institute received the status of a state technical university by Order No. 524 of the State Committee of the Russian Federation for Higher Education dated May 26, 1994.

In 2007, the university won a diploma in the "100 Best Products of Russia" competition in the "Educational Activity" category.

In 2009, the university received a certificate of conformity for its quality management system for educational activities in accordance with the requirements of GOST R ISO 9001-2008.
