= Dmitri Shershnev =

Russian footballer

Personal information
- Full name: Dmitri Anatolyevich Shershnev
- Date of birth: 1 August 1979 (age 47)
- Place of birth: Lipetsk, Russian SFSR
- Height: 1.89 m (6 ft 2 in)
- Position: Midfielder

Senior career*
Years	Team	Apps	(Gls)
1997–1999	FC Metallurg Lipetsk	3	(0)
2003	FC Vidnoye	25	(1)
2004	FC Neftekhimik Nizhnekamsk	8	(0)
2005	FC Oryol	0	(0)
2005	FC Volga Nizhny Novgorod	10	(0)
2006	FC Metallurg Lipetsk	22	(2)
2007	FC SOYUZ-Gazprom Izhevsk	10	(0)
2008	FC Fakel Voronezh (D4)		
2008–2009	FC Rusichi Oryol	20	(4)
- * Club domestic league appearances and goals

Dmitri Anatolyevich Shershnev (Russian: Дмитрий Анатольевич Шершнев; born 1 August 1979) is a former Russian professional football player.

== Club career ==
He played 4 seasons in the Russian Football National League for FC Metallurg Lipetsk and FC Neftekhimik Nizhnekamsk.

== See also ==
- Football in Russia
