= Yuri Gladkikh =

Soviet footballer

Personal information
- Full name: Yuri Nikolaevich Gladkikh
- Date of birth: 8 October 1960 (age 66)
- Place of birth: Lipetsk, Soviet Union
- Height: 1.71 m (5 ft 7 in)
- Position: Forward

Youth career
- Novolipetsk Lipetsk

Senior career*
Years	Team	Apps	(Gls)
1977–1982	Metallurg Lipetsk	166	(28)
1983–1986	Iskra Smolensk	95	(8)
1987	Metallurg Lipetsk	26	(2)
1988–1989	Traktor Pavlodar	72	(10)
1990	Metallurg Yermak	17	(5)
1990–1991	Shakhter Karagandy	24	(1)
1991–1992	Kokshetau	27	(4)
- * Club domestic league appearances and goals

Yuri Nikolaevich Gladkikh (Russian: Юрий Николаевич Гладких; born 8 October 1960) is a Soviet former footballer who played as a midfielder in the 1970s and 1980s.

== Career ==
Born in Lipetsk, Gladkikh began playing football in the Soviet Second League with local side FC Metallurg Lipetsk. He appeared in 192 league matches over two stints with Metallurg. In 1983, Gladkikh joined Soviet First League side FC Iskra Smolensk, where he would make nearly 100 league appearances over four years. He also helped the club reach the semi-finals of the 1984–85 Soviet Cup, and was awarded Master of Sports of the USSR that year.
