= Ducati (disambiguation) =

Ducati is an Italian motorcycle manufacturer.

Ducati or variation, may refer to:

== Organizations ==
- Ducati (company), an Italian conglomerate
- Ducati Corse, an Italian motorcycle racing team

== Other uses ==
- Texas Instruments Ducati, an AV CODEC coprocessor
- Caterina Ducati, a materials scientist

== See also ==
- Ducati Museum, Bologna, Italy
- Ducato (disambiguation)
- Ducat (disambiguation)
