= Lipetsk =

City in Lipetsk Oblast, Russia

Lipetsk Липецк
- City
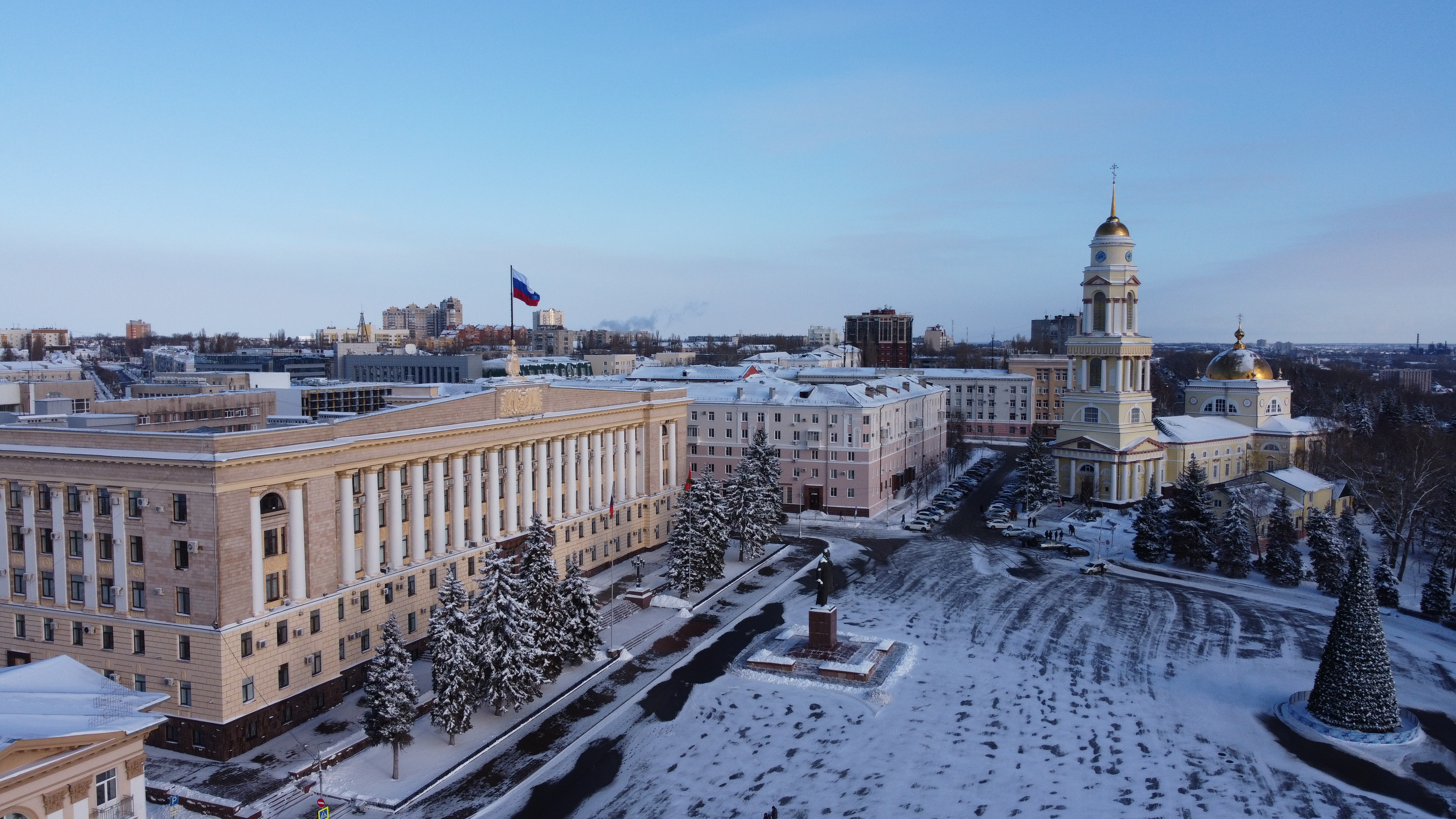
- Sobornaya Square

- Flag Coat of arms
- Interactive map of Lipetsk
- Location of Lipetsk Lipetsk (Russia) Lipetsk (European Russia) Lipetsk (Europe)
- Coordinates: 52°37′N 39°36′E
- Country: Russia
- Federal subject: Lipetsk Oblast
- Founded: 1703
- City status since: September 27, 1779

Government
  - Body: Council of Deputies
  - Head: Yevgenia Uvarkina
- Elevation: 160 m (520 ft)

Population (2010 Census)
  - Total: 508,887
  - Estimate (2025): 509,719 (+0.2%)
  - Rank: 36th in 2010

Administrative status
  - Subordinated to: Lipetsk City Under Oblast Jurisdiction
  - Capital of: Lipetsk Oblast, Lipetsky District

Municipal status
  - Urban okrug: Lipetsk Urban Okrug
  - Capital of: Lipetsk Urban Okrug, Lipetsky Municipal District
- Time zone: UTC+3 (MSK)
- Postal codes: 398000–398002, 398004–398007, 398011, 398013–398017, 398019, 398020, 398024–398027, 328029, 328032, 328035–328038, 328040–328043, 328046, 328048, 328050, 328054–328056, 328058, 328059, 328070, 328700, 328899, 328910, 328999
- Dialing code: +7 4742
- OKTMO ID: 42701000001
- City Day: Third Sunday in July
- Website: www.lipetskcity.ru

Lipetsk (Russian: Ли́пецк, IPA: [ˈlʲipʲɪtsk]), also romanized as Lipeck, is a city and the administrative center of Lipetsk Oblast, Russia, located on the banks of the Voronezh River in the Don basin, 438 kilometers (272 mi) southeast of Moscow.

== History ==
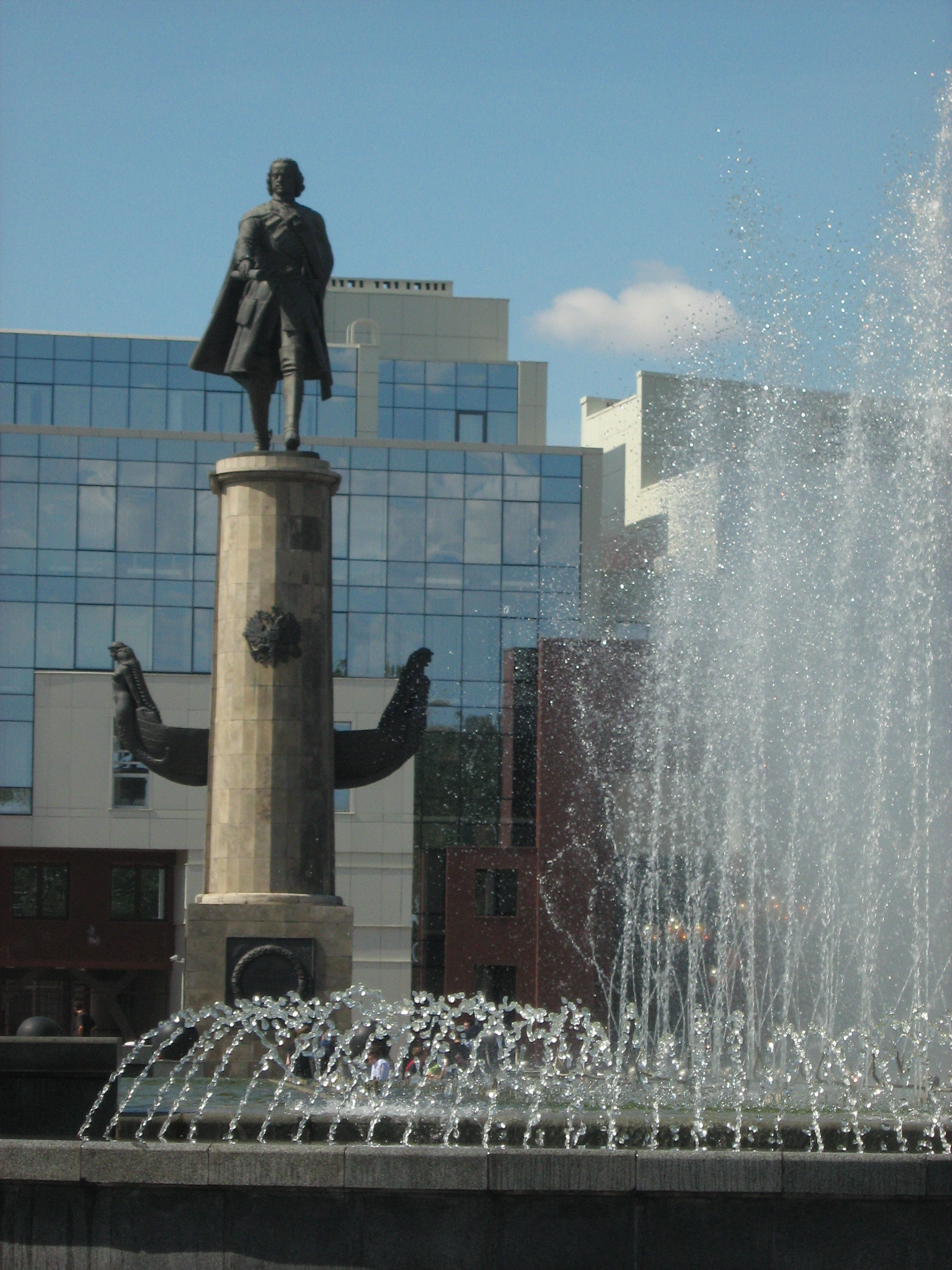
Monument to Peter the Great

The name means "Linden city" and is cognate with Leipzig. In 1284, the city was destroyed by the Mongols.

The foundation of the modern city dates back to 1703, when Peter the Great ordered construction of a cast iron factory in Lipetsk near the iron ore deposits for making artillery shells. On September 27, 1779, Lipetsk was granted town status. It became one of the principal towns of Tambov Governorate.

In 1879, Lipetsk hosted a congress of members of Land and Liberty.

After the Treaty of Rapallo (1922) until 1933, the much-reduced German Army (Reichswehr) of the Weimar Republic secretly contracted with Soviet authorities to operate a clandestine military aviation base and test facility near Lipetsk – circumventing prohibitions of the Versailles Treaty. The base enabled technical collaboration by the two powers whose separate defeats in World War I left them isolated in post-war Europe. This activity inside the USSR took place away from the vigilant eyes of the victors. The Abwehr, The SS and German Army Group Centre penetrated part of this Lindenstadt Region in 1941–2.

== Administrative and municipal status ==
Lipetsk is the administrative center of the oblast and, within the framework of administrative divisions, it also serves as the administrative center of Lipetsky District, even though it is not a part of it. As an administrative division, it is incorporated separately as Lipetsk City Under Oblast Jurisdiction—an administrative unit with a status equal to that of the districts. As a municipal division, Lipetsk City Under Oblast Jurisdiction is incorporated as Lipetsk Urban Okrug.

== Economy ==
The principal industries of Lipetsk include ferrous metallurgy, machinery, metalworking, machine tools, engines, chemicals, food, and clothing.

The former steel combine was privatized in 1992 and Novolipetsk Steel (NLMK) with approximately 48,000 employees and a 64% export ratio (2005) is one of the largest employers in the oblast. In 2008, the company's revenue was $11.7 billion. Other industry are another metallurgical plant "Svobodny Sokol" ("Free Falcon"), a tractor factory LTZ, solvent-extraction plant Liboil (largest rapeseed oil producer in Central Federal District and the second in Russia), pipe factory, a factory for refrigerators and household appliances, an ice factory, lathe factory, chemical factories, etc. Industry is mainly located south of the Voronezh River.

=== Transportation ===
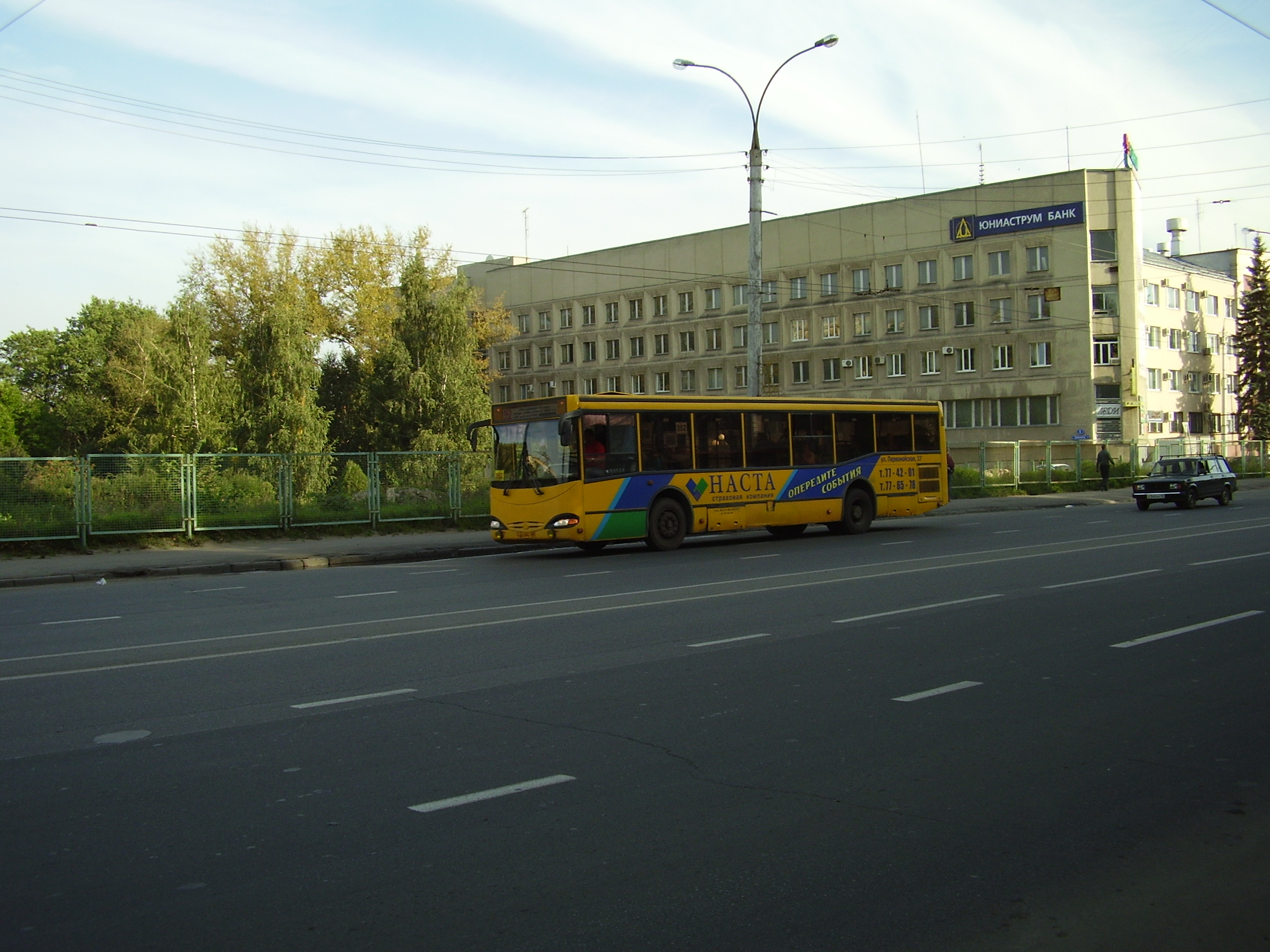
Bus in Lipetsk, 2007

Since 1868, there is a railway connection between Lipetsk and Moscow. Trams, trolleybuses and buses provide local public transportation. In 2013, the municipality aspired to renovate the tramway network as it is largely segregated from motor traffic. It negotiated a 10-year, RUR 30 billion loan from the European Bank of Reconstruction & Development for tramway renewal.

=== Health care ===
Lipetsk is one of the oldest mud bath and balneological resorts in Russia (first opened in 1805). Peat mud and chalybeate bicarbonate calcic springs are used to treat patients. Sulphate and chloride sodium water is used for therapeutic baths and drinking.

== Education ==
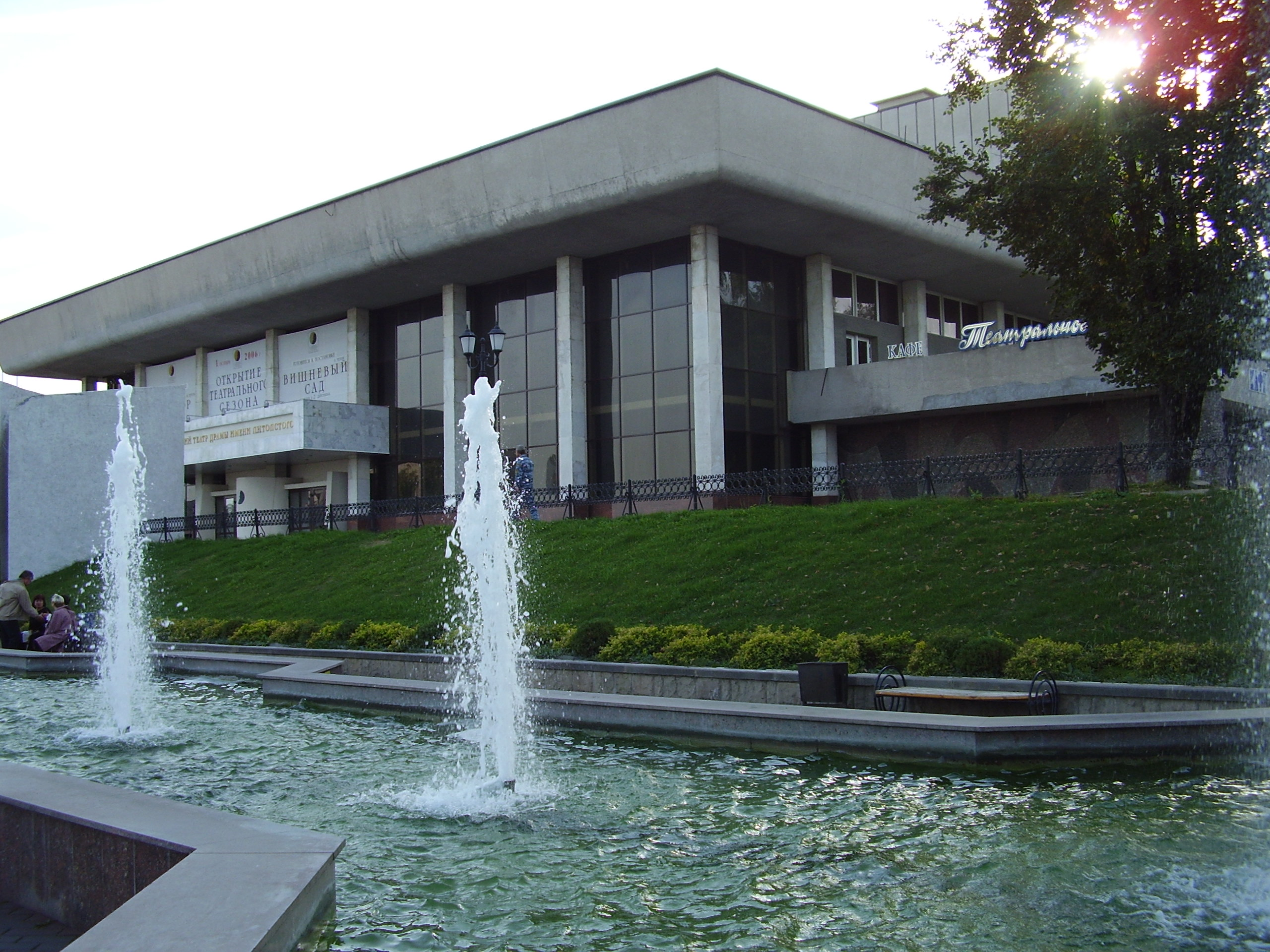
Lipetsk State Academic Drama Theater named after Leo Tolstoy

Lipetsk is home of the Lipetsk State Technical University, Lipetsk State Pedagogical University, and some other colleges.

== Military ==
The Lipetsk air base is located north of the town. The 4th Center of Combat Application and Conversion of Frontline Aviation named after Valery Chkalov is situated in Lipetsk.

The Lipetsk Air Center's chief, colonel Kharchevsky, has become famous after trial air combats in the United States and being a personal pilot of President Putin.

The city is also served by the smaller Lipetsk Airport.

On 24 February 2024, Ukraine claimed that its drones set fire to the Novolipetsk steel plant in Lipetsk. No casualties were reported however the facility was evacuated.

== Twin towns and sister cities ==
Lipetsk is twinned with:

Country	City	Start
Germany	Cottbus	1974
China	Anshan	1992
Italy	Fabriano	2003

== Notable people ==
- Andrei Gheorghe
- Yuri Gladkikh
- Viktor Kukin
- Dmitry Kulikov
- Alexandre Naoumenko
- Dmitri Shershnev
- Eugene Smurgis
- Maria Viktorovna
