= Cape Ducato =

Cape Ducato may refer to:

- Lefkada, a Greek island in the Ionian Sea also called Cape Ducato
  - Action off Cape Ducato, a World War I naval engagement between French destroyers Mameluk and Lansquenet and French cruiser Châteaurenault, against German submarine SM UC-38
- Cape Ducato-class vehicle cargo ship, a post-Cold-War U.S. Navy RORO transport vessel class
  - MV Cape Ducato (T-AKR-5051), a Cape Ducato-class post-Cold-War U.S. Navy auxiliary ship
- SS Cape Ducato, a World War II U.S. Navy Type C1-A small transport vessel; see Type C1 ship

== See also ==
- Ducato (disambiguation)
- Cape (disambiguation)
