= Viktor Kukin =

Russian footballer

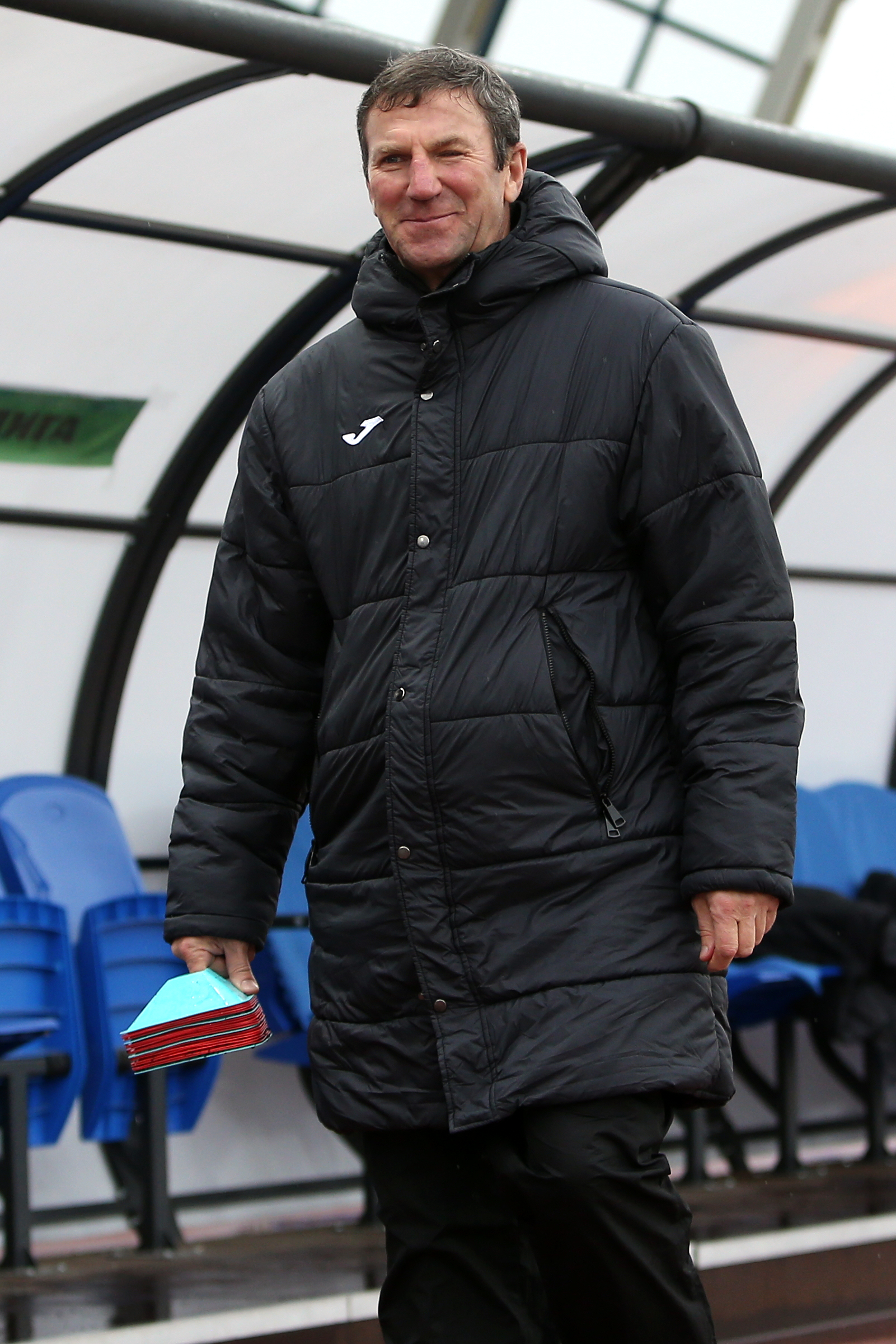

Personal information
- Full name: Viktor Ivanovich Kukin
- Date of birth: 1 May 1960 (age 66)
- Place of birth: Lipetsk, Russian SFSR
- Positions: Defender; midfielder

Team information
- Current team: FC Metallurg Lipetsk (administrator)

Youth career
- FC Metallurg Lipetsk

Senior career*
Years	Team	Apps	(Gls)
1978–1979	FC Metallurg Lipetsk	35	(1)
1979	FC Krylia Sovetov Kuybyshev	11	(1)
1980	FC Kuban Krasnodar	15	(0)
1981–1982	FC Metallurg Lipetsk	36	(0)
1982–1983	FC Iskra Smolensk	57	(0)
1984–1990	FC Metallurg Lipetsk	118	(8)
1988	FC Novolipetsk Lipetsk		
1989–1990	FC Metallurg Lipetsk	53	(2)
1990–1991	FC Uralan Elista	53	(0)

Managerial career
- 1988: FC Novolipetsk Lipetsk
- 2002–2005: FC Metallurg Lipetsk (administrator)
- 2006: FC Metallurg Lipetsk (director)
- 2007–: FC Metallurg Lipetsk (administrator)
- * Club domestic league appearances and goals

Viktor Ivanovich Kukin (Russian: Виктор Иванович Кукин; born 1 May 1960) is a Russian professional football official and a former player and referee. He works as an administrator with FC Metallurg Lipetsk.

== Playing career ==
A graduate of the FC Metallurg Lipetsk youth football system, Kukin played professional football in the Soviet Top League with FC Krylia Sovetov Kuybyshev and FC Kuban Krasnodar, and in the Soviet First League and Soviet Second League with FC Novolipetsk Lipetsk and FC Metallurg Lipetsk.

== Referee career ==
From 1993 to 2001 he worked as a referee in the Russian First Division and lower levels.
