= The Darling (short story) =

Short story by Anton Chekhov

"The Darling" (Russian: Душечка, romanized: Dushechka) is a short story by Russian author Anton Chekhov, first published in the No.1, 1899, issue of Semya (Family) magazine, on January 3, in Moscow. Later, Chekhov included it into Volume 9 of his Collected Works, published by Adolf Marks.

The story follows the life of a woman who is referred to by others as "darling" for her generosity and submissive nature.

== Background ==
Anton Chekhov started writing short comic stories while attending medical school to help pay for school and his family. He finally became a full-time writer in 1892 and wrote his famous stories such as "Neighbors", "Ward Number Six", "The Black Monk", and "The Murder". Chekhov was known throughout Russia, but remained unknown internationally up until World War I, when the majority of his works were translated into English.

The main character of Olenka may be based in part on Chekhov's mother, who had deeply loved her own father, traveling all over Russia with him as a fabric merchant, and who stayed loyal to her husband through abuse, alcoholism and bankruptcy.

== Plot ==
Olenka Plemyannikova, the daughter of a retired collegiate assessor, falls in love with the theater owner, Kukin. Olenka's father dies and she marries Kukin, the two of them live a happy married life. She soon takes over some of his roles in the box office by keeping accounts and the business end of some payments; during this time she becomes more involved in the business and acts like Kukin. Kukin travels to Moscow and dies; Olenka is given word of his death and mourns for three months. Olenka soon finds another man she becomes attached to, Vasily Pustovalov, a merchant from a timber yard; after a few days she becomes infatuated by him and they marry. Olenka disregards all responsibilities of the theater and concentrates on the opinions and thoughts of her new husband. The two of them live a comfortable life of casual talk and religious activities until Vasily becomes ill and dies from a prolonged cold. Shortly after Vasily's death another man enters Olenka's life, Smirnin, a veterinary surgeon. Smirnin complains that he had left his wife and son because of her unfaithfulness, so he is offered the lodge to live in with Olenka until he is able to fix the situation. Olenka and Smirnin become involved with one another, but try to keep it a secret; this fails because Olenka talks to Smirnin's friends about the cattle, which embarrasses him. Smirnin leaves to travel to Moscow and is gone for months, during this time Olenka cannot think of anything independently from her husband or predominant male figure and is unable to create an opinion. Smirnin finally returns and states that he has started working again as a veterinary because his son is now at the age of attending school and that he has reconciled with his wife; Smirnin's family moves into the lodge that Olenka offers to them. Olenka soon becomes obsessed with the son, Sasha; she follows him to school and confesses that she loved him, "never had her soul surrendered to any feeling so spontaneously". The final line in the short story is a quote from a sleeping Sasha, "I'll give it to you, get away! Shut up!"

== Characters ==
- Olenka (Olga Semyonovna Plemyanniakova): the daughter of a retired collegiate assessor. Beautiful, emotional, gentle, soft-hearted, compassionate, with mild and tender eyes. Easily swayed with the opinions around her and follows those that are closest to her. Is referred to as "darling" for her sweet personality and willingness to give.
- Plemyanniakov: Olenka's Father – A retired collegiate assessor – has fallen ill and dies in the beginning of the story. Olenka's first male figure.
- Ivan Petrovich Kukin: neighbor of Olenka – manages the open air theater. Becomes Olenka's first husband and dies when he works in Moscow. Described as a small thin man, yellow face, with curls, talks in a thin tenor voice with an expression of despair, but had a deep genuine affection in Olenka
- Vassily Andreitch Pustovalov: Olenka's neighbor is a merchant from a timber yard. He comforts her after the death of Kukin and falls in love with Olenka. Falls ill from a cold and later dies a few months later. Olenka's third male figure.
- Vladimir Platonitch Smirnin: a veterinary surgeon – has separated from his wife who has his son, left her because of unfaithfulness. Easily embarrassed by Olenka. Olenka's fourth male figure
- Sasha: Smirnin's son from his previous marriage attends school and is very intelligent. Parents abandoned him for work and social lives so was raised by Olenka. This is the last male figure that Olenka cares for, but she smothers him with maternal love as compared to her previous husbands/male figures.

== Themes ==
The predominant theme in the story is codependency. Olenka is obsessed with her male companions because she depends on them for validation and social status. "It was evident that she could not live without attachment." When she is married to the theatre manager, she lives and breathes for the theatre. When she is married to the devout lumber merchant, she only thinks of lumber and attends church instead of the theatre. When she becomes the companion to the veterinary surgeon, she learns everything she can about animal husbandry and animal disease so that she can keep up with the dinner party conversations with other veterinarians. After the veterinary surgeon leaves town for work, she becomes deeply depressed without someone to be attached to. "What was worst of all, she had no opinions of any sort. She saw the object about her and understood what she saw, but could not form any opinion about them, and did not know what to talk about. And how awful it is to not have any opinions." Her final codependent relationship is with the son of the veterinary surgeon, Sasha. She becomes as obsessed with the child as with any of the adult men in her life. "How she loved him. Of her former attachments, none had been so deep." Olenka even begins to study so that she can keep up with his schoolwork. Through this education, she finally is able to develop opinions of her own.

The secondary theme is the trap of selflessness inherent in codependency. Olenka offers money to struggling actors, free room and board to the veterinary surgeon, and full time care to Sasha as a way to stay connected to them. Everyone calls her "The Darling" because she is generous and supportive; which is seen by adults in the community as a positive trait. The story ends abruptly with Sasha rejecting Olenka, calling out her codependent behavior; pointing out her folly in the way only a child can do.
