= Dukat mine =

Gold mine in Russia

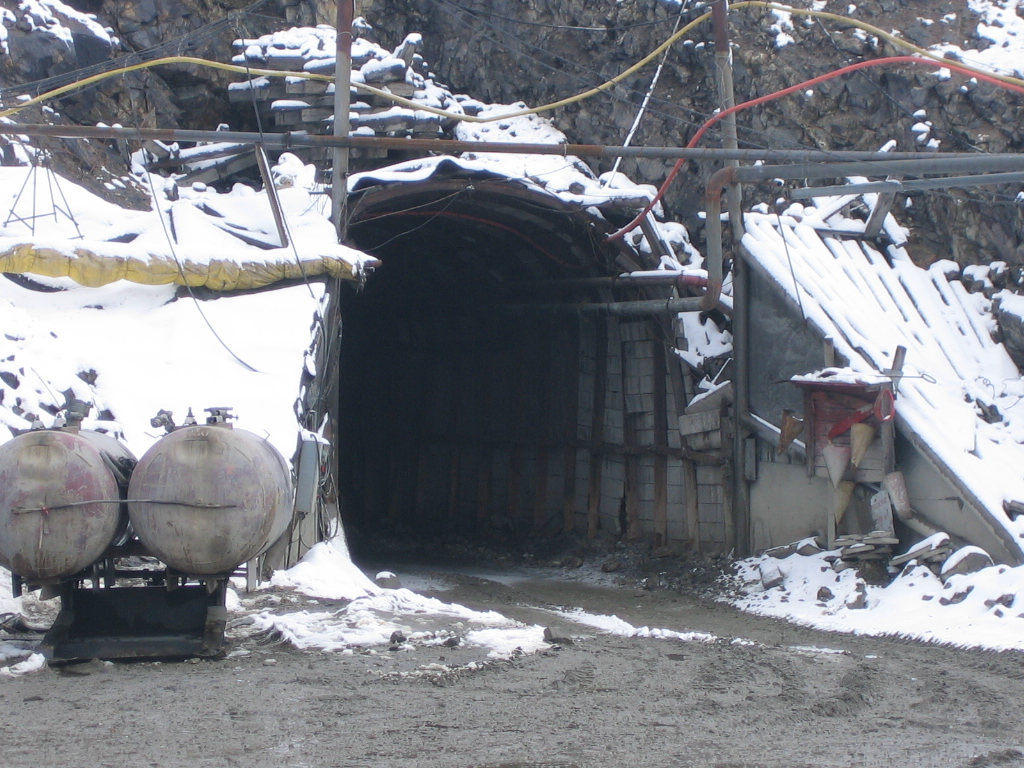
- Entrance to the gallery 22

- Location within Russia
- Location: Magadan, Russia; 62°34′18.9″N 155°17′22.3″E
- Products: Gold

The Dukat mine is one of the largest gold mines in Russia and in the world. The mine is located few km west of Dukat, a town in Omsukchansky District, Magadan Oblast. The mine has estimated reserves of 7.4 million oz of gold.

== See also ==
- Gold mining
