= Omsukchansky District =

Omsukchansky District Омсукчанский район (Russian)
- District
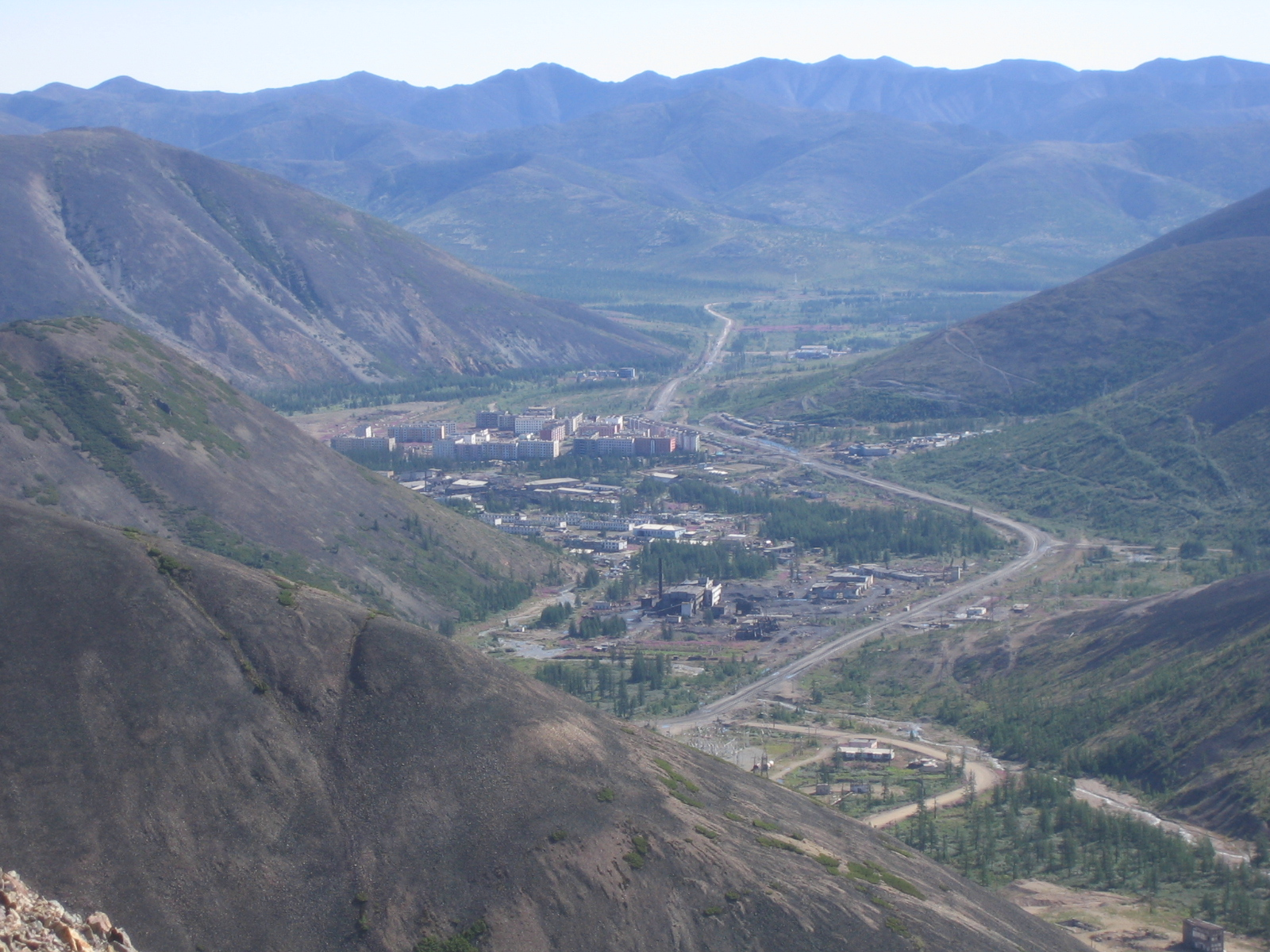
- View of the urban-type settlement of Dukat in Omsukchansky District

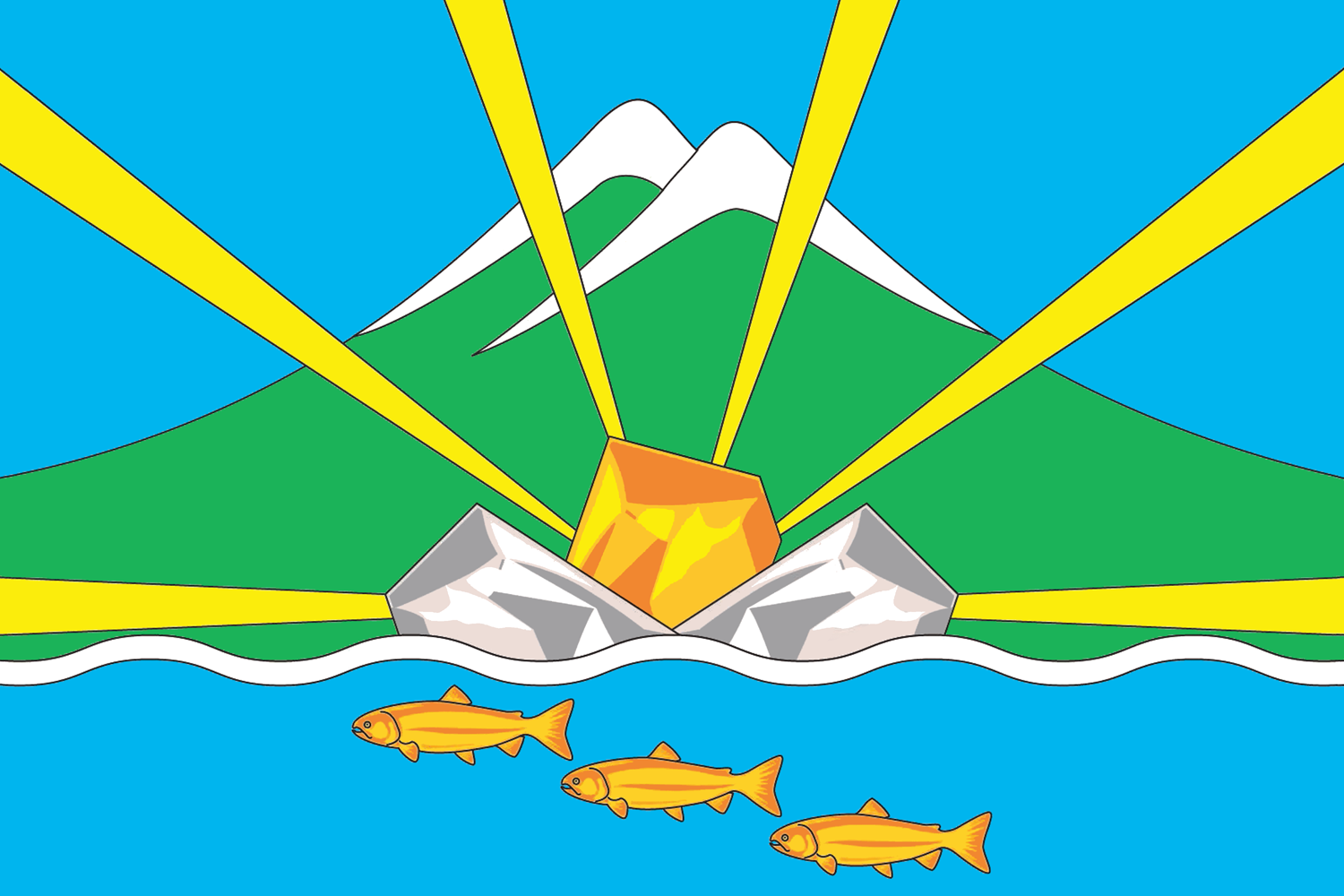
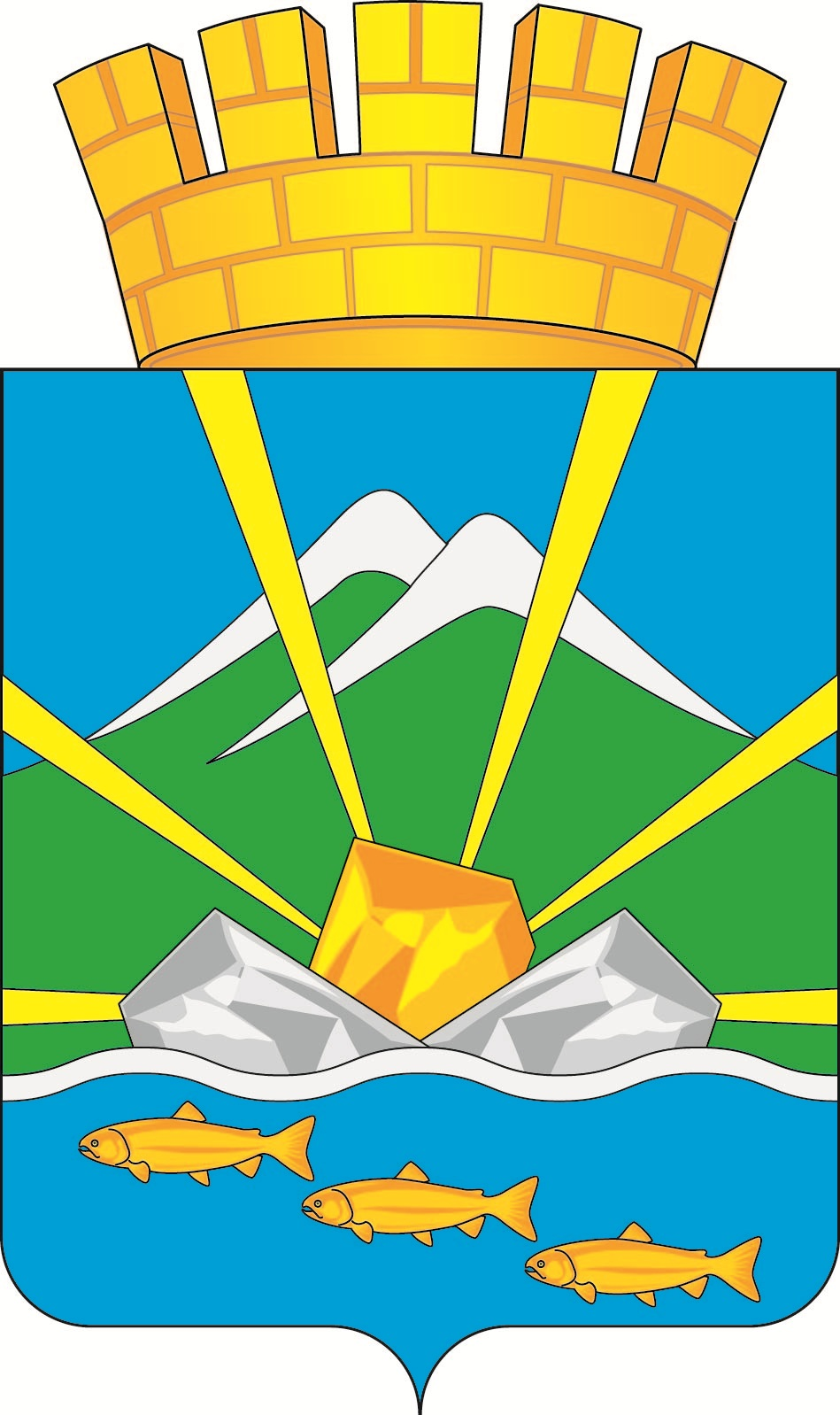
- Flag Coat of arms
- Location of Omsukchansky District in Magadan Oblast
- Coordinates: 63°00′N 156°20′E
- Country: Russia
- Federal subject: Magadan Oblast
- Established: July 16, 1954
- Administrative center: Omsukchan

Area
  - Total: 60,400 km^{2} (23,300 sq mi)

Population (2010 Census)
  - Total: 5,531
  - Estimate (1 January 2017): 5,078
  - Density: 0.0916/km^{2} (0.237/sq mi)
  - Urban: 99.7%
  - Rural: 0.3%

Administrative structure
  - Inhabited localities: 3 urban-type settlements, 2 rural localities

Municipal structure
  - Municipally incorporated as: Omsukchansky Urban Okrug
- Time zone: UTC+11 (MSK+8)
- OKTMO ID: 44704000
- Website: http://omsukchan-adm.ru

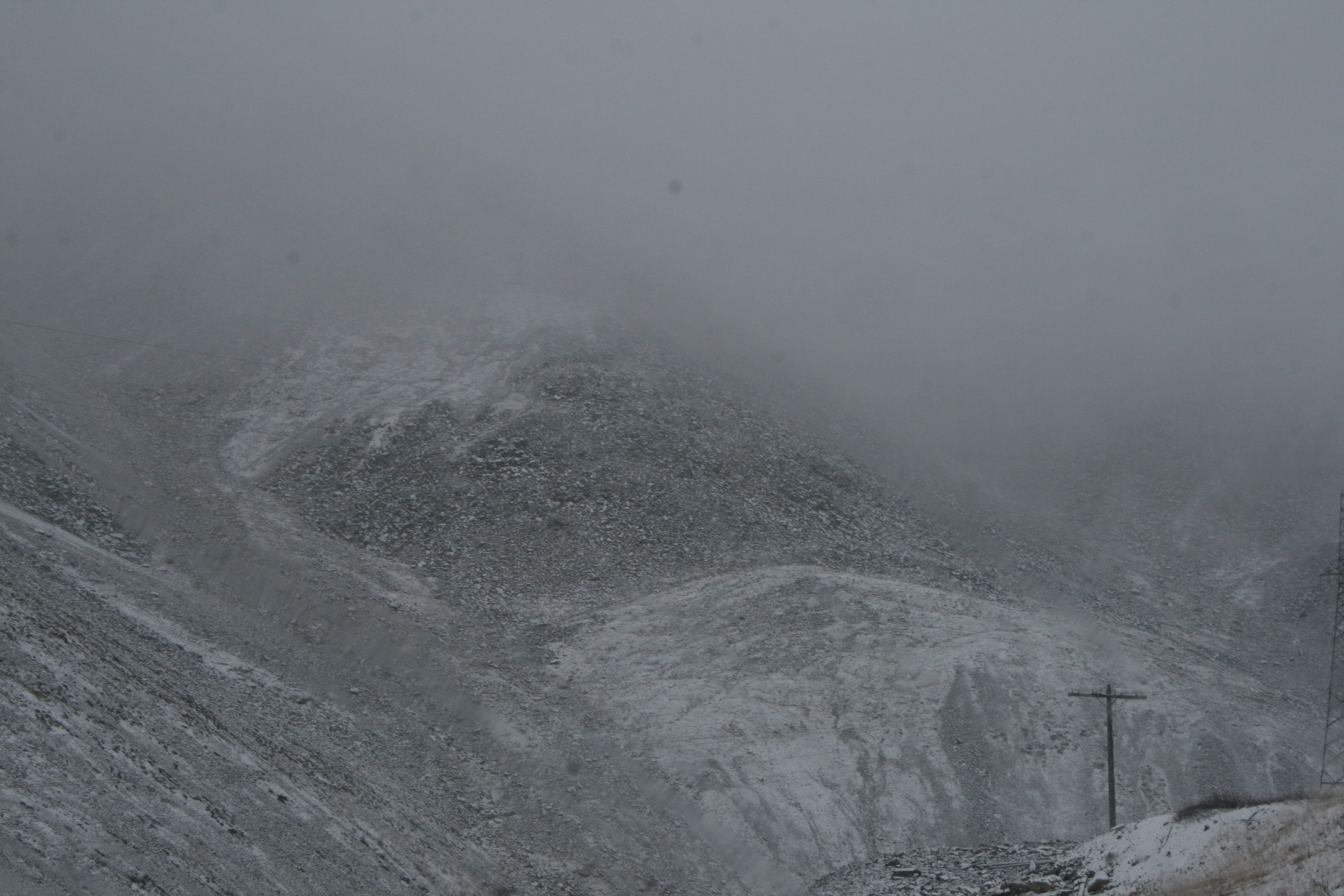
The Karpanovsky Mountain Pass

Omsukchansky District (Russian: Омсукча́нский райо́н) is an administrative district (raion), one of the eight in Magadan Oblast, Russia. As a municipal division, it is incorporated as Omsukchansky Urban Okrug. It is located in the eastern central part of the oblast. The area of the district is 60,400 square kilometers (23,300 sq mi). Its administrative center is the urban locality (an urban-type settlement) of Omsukchan. As of the 2010 Census, the total population of the district was 5,531, with the population of Omsukchan accounting for 75.2% of that number.

Historical population
Year	Pop.	±%
1959	4,927	—
1970	7,446	+51.1%
1979	14,886	+99.9%
1989	19,419	+30.5%
2002	6,209	−68.0%
2010	5,531	−10.9%
2021	4,543	−17.9%
Source: Census data

== History ==
The territory of modern Omsukchansky District was originally a part of Severo-Evensky District. The split was formalized on July 16, 1954, which is considered the date of Omsukchansky District's foundation.

== Geography ==
The Omsukchan Range, highest ridge of the Kolyma Mountains, rises in the district to the northwest of Omsukchan town. The Korkodon river flows across the district in its upper course.

=== Administrative and municipal status ===
Within the framework of administrative divisions, Omsukchansky District is one of the eight in the oblast. The urban locality (an urban-type settlement) of Omsukchan serves as its administrative center.

As a municipal division, the district has been incorporated as Omsukchansky Urban Okrug since January 1, 2015. Prior to that date, the district was incorporated as Omsukchansky Municipal District, which was subdivided into two urban settlements.

=== Settlements ===
Name	Type	Pop. (2017)	Coord
Omsukchan (Омсукчан)	Urban-type, seat	3,763	62°30′40.6″N 155°47′01.4″E
Dukat (Дукат)	Urban-type	1,315	62°34′28.4″N 155°23′08.0″E
Galimy (Галимый)	Urban-type	0	62°21′14.2″N 155°57′50.0″E
Merenga (Меренга)	Village (selo)	0	61°53′27.2″N 156°08′12.0″E
Verkhny Balygychan (Верхний Балыгычан)	Village (posyolok)	0	62°06′55.4″N 154°40′39.6″E
Industrialny (Индустриальный)	abolished village	0	62°33′11.4″N 155°41′53.5″E
Kupka (Купка)	abolished village	0	62°04′02.1″N 153°30′03.2″E
Trud (Труд)	abolished village	0	62°05′03.1″N 155°42′13.0″E

== See also ==
- Dukat mine
- Omsukchan Airport
