= Ducat (surname) =

Ducat is a surname. Notable people with the surname include:

- Andy Ducat (1886–1942), British cricketer and professional footballer
- Arthur Ducat (1830–1896), American Union Army officer and businessman
- Benedicto Ducat (born 1957), Filipino impressionist painter
- Robert Ducat (born 1969), American Christian music artist
- William Ducat (1847–1922), British archdeacon
