= Leonid Komskyi =

Art collector and gallery owner (b. 1964)

Leonid Komskyi Леонід Комський
- Born: 16 July 1964 (age 61); Irpin, Kyiv Region, Soviet Union
- Occupations: Ukrainian gallery owner and collector, founder of "Ducat" Auction House, President of the Guild of Antiquaries of Ukraine

Leonid Komskyi (born 16 July 1964, Irpin, Kyiv region, USSR) is a Ukrainian gallery owner and collector. He founded Ducat Auction House and served as President of the Guild of Antiquaries of Ukraine.

== Career ==
Komskyi founded Ducat Auction House in 2008. The main emphasis is the art of the first half of the 20th century, the domestic unofficial art of the 1950-1990s and modern art.

In 2016, Ducat presented Ukraine's first-ever second-hand book auction, "Ukrainian Book".

3-4% of the lots are the works of young artists. The paintings of such masters as Matvii Vaisberh, Pavlo Makov, Oleksandr Zhyvotkov, Oleksandr Roitburd are mostly exhibited.

Rare Ukrainian books, maps, documents and graphics are exhibited in the gallery. In particular, alongside "The Ukrainian Book" auction, the lifetime edition of the "Aeneid" of Kotliarevsky and the works of Taras Shevchenko were exhibited.

According to Komskyi, art lovers used to buy paintings of Russian classics, while Ukrainian art is becoming increasingly popular.

Komskyi is the publisher of the Antiquary magazine.

In 2018, he participated in the Real Proof project, helping activists to seize a house on 8B Reitarska Street, and was accused of raiding.

== Connections ==
Komskyi was associated with the former Deputy Prime Minister Dmytro Tabachnyk. He acted as an intermediary in the resale of valuable paintings and early printed books.

Komskyi is listed as a beneficiary of "Olivin +" LLC, a jewellery manufacturer.
