= Lipetsk State Pedagogical University =

Public university in Russia

- Федеральное государственное бюджетное образовательное учреждение высшего образования "Липецкий государственный педагогический университет имени П.П. Семёнова-Тян-Шанского"
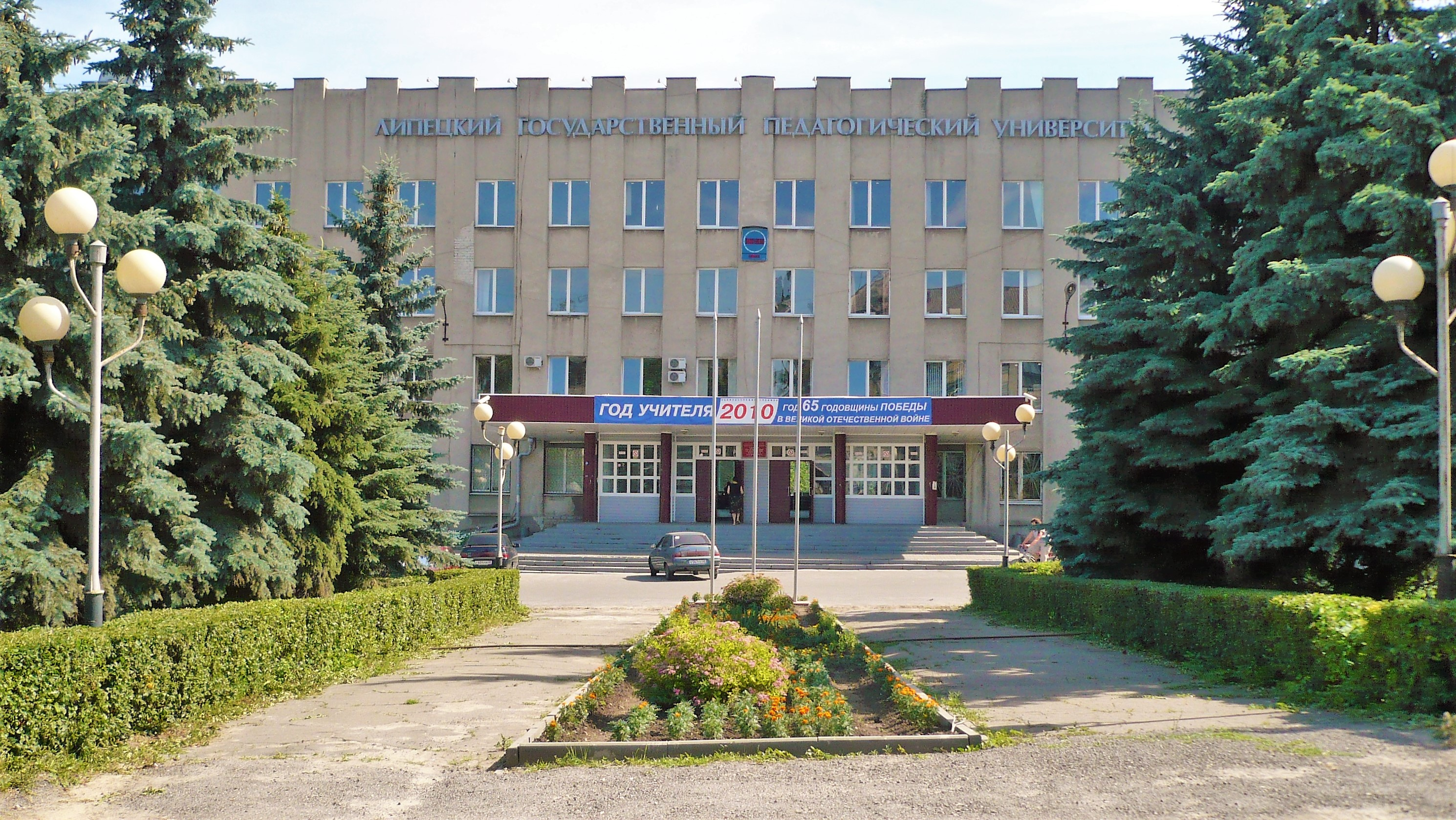
- Type: public
- Established: 1949
- Rector: Nina Fedina
- Students: 45,000
- Location: Lipetsk, Russia; 52.617582897°N 39.6187819081°E
- Campus: urban
- Language: Russian
- Website: https://lspu-lipetsk.ru/
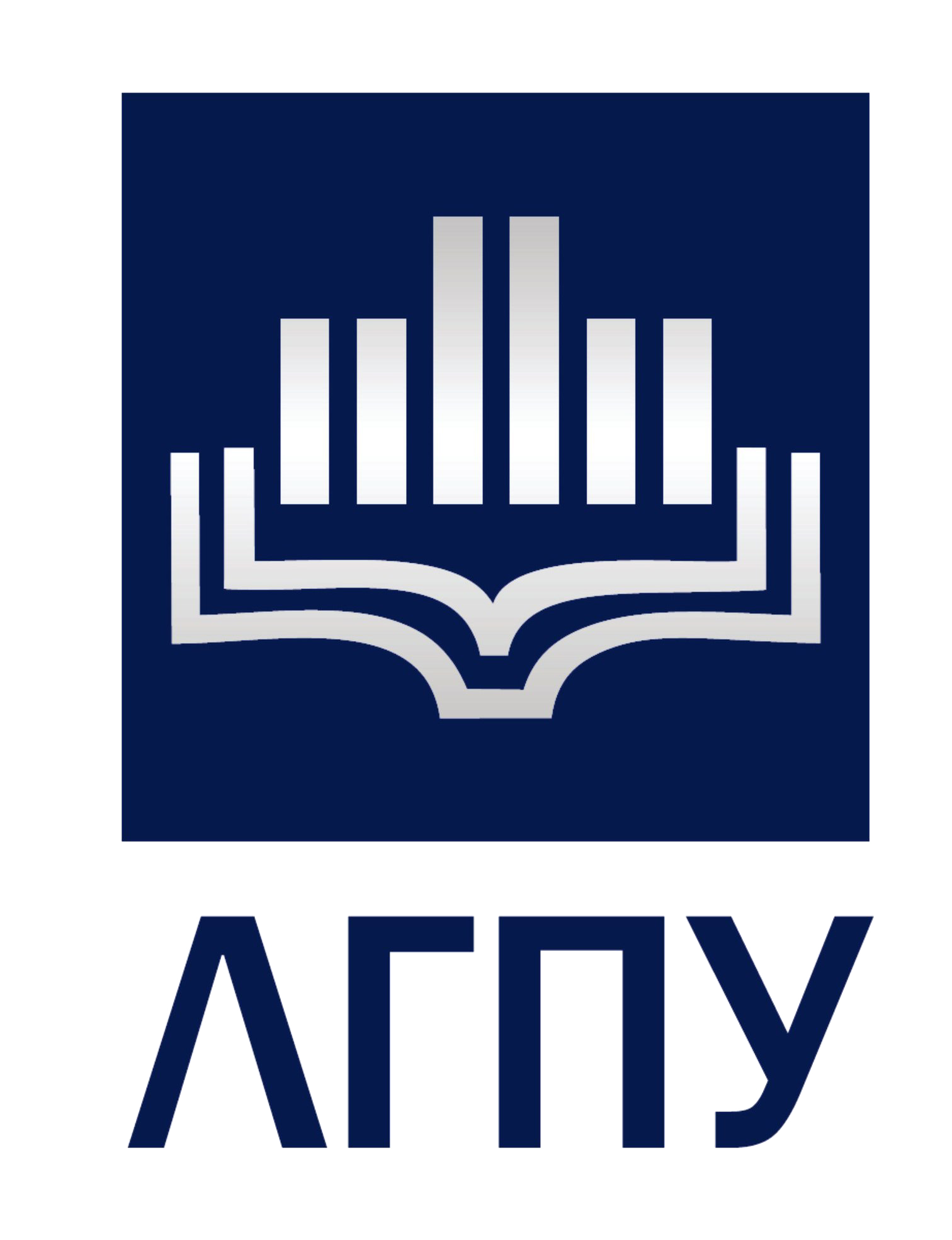

Lipetsk State Pedagogical University (Russian: Федеральное государственное бюджетное образовательное учреждение высшего образования "Липецкий государственный педагогический университет имени П.П. Семёнова-Тян-Шанского") is a public university located in Lipetsk, Russia. It was founded in 1949 on the basis of the Lipetsk Pedagogical Vocational School as a teacher's institute.

== History ==
In 1931, the Lipetsk Pedagogical Vocational School was established, which trained primary school teachers. In 1949, a teacher's institute was formed on the basis of the Lipetsk Pedagogical Vocational School. At that time, the institute had about 200 students and 2 faculties: historical-philological and physical-mathematical. In 1954, in connection with the acquisition of the status of a regional center by Lipetsk, by order of the Ministry of Education of the Russian Soviet Federative Socialist Republic dated 8 June 1954, the teacher's institute was transformed into the Lipetsk State Pedagogical Institute.

Since 1975, foreign students began to study at the institute.

On 10 October 2000, the institute was renamed into the Lipetsk State Pedagogical University. In 2016, the university was named after Pyotr Semyonov-Tyan-Shansky, a Russian geographer and statistician.

== Structure ==
Since 1 February 2016, the university has included 6 specialized independent institutes, which were created on the basis of 13 previously functioning faculties:

- Institute of Natural, Mathematical and Technical Sciences;
- Institute of History, Law and Social Sciences;
- Institute of Psychology and Education;
- Institute of Physical Culture and Sports;
- Institute of Philology;
- Institute of Culture and Art.
