= Fyodor Kukin =

Russian ice hockey player

- Born: February 26, 1993 (age 32); Arkhangelsk, Russia
- Height: 6 ft 0 in (183 cm)
- Weight: 165 lb (75 kg; 11 st 11 lb)
- Position: Goaltender
- Caught: left
- Played for: Yugra Khanty-Mansiysk
- Playing career: 2010–2017

Fyodor Kukin (born February 26, 1993) is a Russian former professional ice hockey goaltender.

Kukin played one game in Kontinental Hockey League with Yugra Khanty-Mansiysk during the 2013-14 KHL season. He signed for HC Plzeň of the Czech Extraliga in 2015 but never played a game for the team.
