= Omsukchan Airport =

- IATA: none; ICAO: UHMF; LID: ОСУ

Summary
- Airport type: Public
- Serves: Omsukchan
- Elevation AMSL: 528 m / 1,732 ft
- Coordinates: 62°27′28″N 155°44′18″E

Map
- Location in Magadan Oblast

Runways
Direction	Length		Surface
Direction	m	ft	Surface
04/22	2,100	6,900

Omsukchan Airport (ICAO: UHMF) is a minor airport built 7 km south of Omsukchan in Magadan Oblast, Russia

== Airlines and destinations ==
Airlines	Destinations
SiLA Airlines	Magadan

== See also ==
- List of airports in Russia
