= Galimy =

Galimy Галимый
- Urban-type settlement
- Interactive map of Galimy
- Location of Galimy Galimy (Magadan Oblast)
- Coordinates: 62.3550°N 155.9679°E
- Country: Russia
- Federal subject: Magadan Oblast
- Administrative district: Omsukchansky District
- Founded: 1940
- Elevation: 728 m (2,388 ft)

Population (2010 Census)
  - Total: 5
  - Estimate (2025): 0 (−100%)
- Time zone: UTC+11 (MSK+8)
- Postal code: 686414
- OKTMO ID: 44704000061

Galimy (Russian: Галимый) is an urban locality (an urban-type settlement) in Omsukchansky District of Magadan Oblast, Russia. Population: 5 (2010 census); 188 (2002 census); 1,239 (1989 Soviet census).
