= Collegiate Assessor =

Collegiate assessor

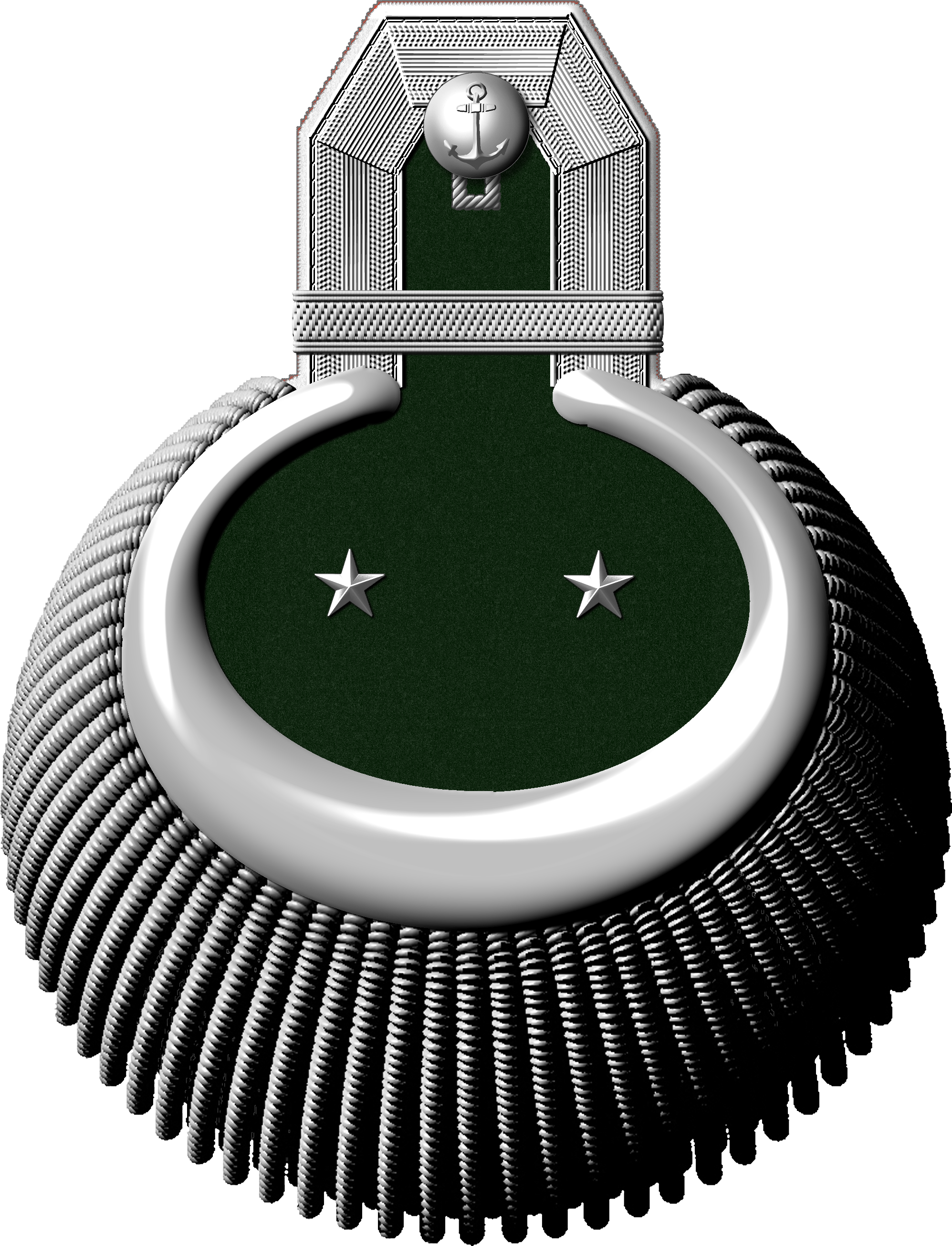
Epaulette
(1883)

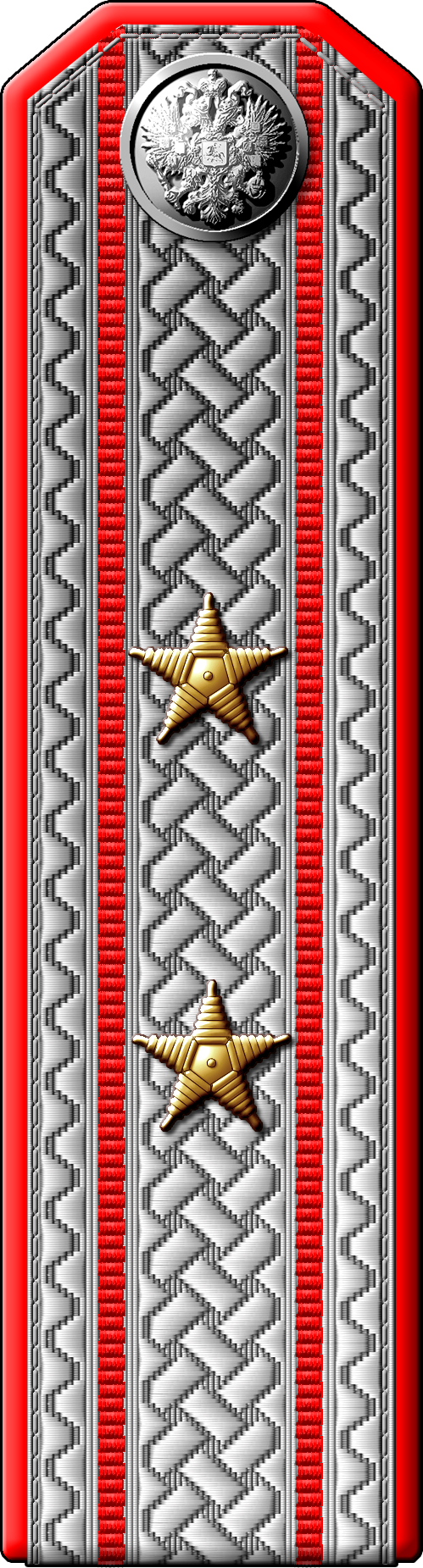
Shoulder board
(1915)

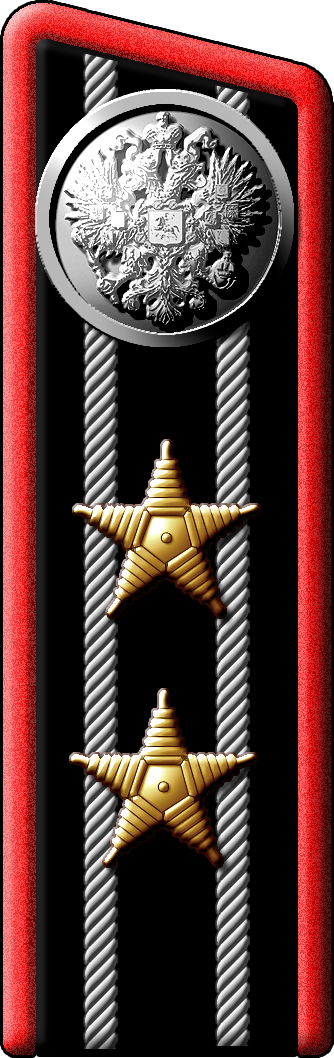
Gorget patch for a greatcoat
(1904)

Civil rank of the 8th class in the Table of Ranks

Collegiate assessor (Russian: коллежский асессор) was a civil service rank in the Russian Empire from 1717 to 1917, corresponding to the 8th class of the Table of Ranks from January 24, 1722. The title originated in 1717, when the position of assessor was established in the Petrine collegia. In addition to the collegia, assessors served in the Senate, the Synod, nadvorny courts, provincial courts, and provincial boards.

Until 1884, the rank corresponded to the army rank of major, and after the abolition of the major rank in the army, it corresponded to captain. Holders of the rank were addressed as "Ваше Высокоблагородие" ("Your High Nobility"). Until 1845, the rank conferred hereditary nobility; thereafter, it conferred only personal nobility. Holders typically served as registrars, secretaries, or councilors. The insignia consisted of two stars on two-striped buttonholes.

A 1745 decree introduced a requirement of 12 years' service for non-nobles seeking advancement from the 9th class. In 1809, promotion to the rank was made conditional on holding a higher-education degree or passing a special examination. In 1834, the required length of service was increased, and in 1856, the preferential terms of promotion based on education were abolished. The practice of hiring graduates from educational institutions that trained the requisite specialists was retained.

During the Caucasian War, in order to attract officials to the civil institutions of the Caucasus Viceroyalty, a simplified procedure for promotion to collegiate assessor was introduced that waived the examination requirement and reduced the required years of service. Young officials who obtained the rank and hereditary nobility by this route were jokingly known in society as "Caucasian assessors".

According to the "Code of Statutes on Civil Service" of 1842, the annual salary of a collegiate assessor was 135 silver rubles, equivalent to 472½ rubles in assignations. By 1847, there were 4,671 collegiate assessors in the Russian Empire.

== Further development of legislation ==
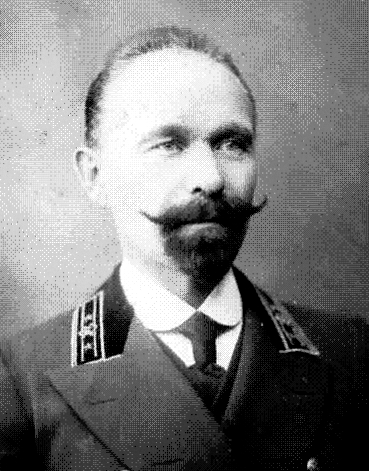
Collegiate assessor V. V. Argentov (variant with a gorget patch for a frock coat and linen coat)

On February 16, 1790, Catherine II signed a decree to the Senate "On the rules of promotion in ranks". Under this decree, holders of a 14th-class rank could advance through the hierarchy by two means, regardless of vacancies: the award of a rank for distinguished service, or the completion of a prescribed number of years in the previous rank (three years). Non-nobles were required to serve 12 years before being promoted from the 9th to the 8th class.

The decree of December 9, 1799, established terms of service for ranks from the 9th to the 5th class (4, 5, 6, and 4 years respectively). It was understood that higher ranks would generally be conferred outside these rules, at the personal discretion of the emperor. The possibility of promotion for distinguished service was again provided for.

The decree of Alexander I to the Senate of August 6, 1809, "On the rules for promotion to ranks in the civil service and on examinations in sciences for promotion to collegiate assessors and state councilors", stipulated that only persons who had completed a higher education or passed an examination according to an established programme could be promoted to the rank of collegiate assessor, in addition to meeting the corresponding length-of-service requirement.

The regulation of 1834 specified that estate affiliation was taken into account only when conferring a rank of the 8th class, which carried hereditary nobility. For non-nobles, the required length of service was increased regardless of educational attainment. A further condition for promotion to collegiate assessor for officials of initial and middle rank was appointment to a position of the corresponding class.

The law of December 9, 1856, "On terms of promotion in ranks in civil service", abolished preferential terms of service based on education and established uniform terms for promotion to the next rank for all officials (four years each from the 8th to the 6th class).

The rank was abolished on November 12, 1917, by the Decree on the Abolition of Estates and Civil Ranks.

== Collegiate assessor in Russian literature ==
- Alexander Pushkin, in an epigram on Alexander I dating to the first half of the 1820s, wrote of the tsar: "the hero has wearied of the front — / Now he is a collegiate assessor / In the department of foreign affairs!" Since the preceding lines describe "our tsar" as a dashing captain, the implication is that the emperor received a promotion upon transferring to a different department.
- In his Lyceum poem "To Comrades" (1817), Pushkin wrote: "I do not tear my breast to become a captain / And I do not crawl into assessors".
- Nikolai Gogol: The protagonist of the short story "The Nose", Kovalyov, is a collegiate assessor, though he prefers to be called a major (Gogol himself later attained this rank). Ivan Pavlovich Yaichnitsa in the play Marriage holds the rank of collegiate assessor. In the comedy "The Government Inspector", the district court judge Ammos Fyodorovich Lyapkin-Tyapkin also holds this rank.
- Alexander Griboyedov, "Woe from Wit": Famusov obtained the rank of collegiate assessor for Molchalin, thereby demonstrating great trust in him.
- Fyodor Dostoevsky, "Notes from Underground": The narrator served for many years as a collegiate assessor before receiving an inheritance of six thousand rubles and immediately retiring.
- Anton Chekhov: In the short story "Fat and Thin", the character Porfiry (the thin man) is a collegiate assessor: "I am serving, my dear! A collegiate assessor for two years now, and I have the Stanislaus". In the short story "The Darling", the protagonist Olenka is introduced as the daughter of a retired collegiate assessor. In the story "Lawlessness", the protagonist, collegiate assessor Miguev, has been unfaithful to his wife with a maid and is convinced that she has left their baby on his doorstep — it is precisely the fear for his position and reputation that drives Miguev's subsequent misadventures that evening.
