= Fat and Thin (sculpture) =

The sculptural composition Fat and Thin
- Russian: Скульптурная композиция «Толстый и тонкий»
- Interactive map of The sculptural composition Fat and Thin
- Location: Taganrog, Rostov Oblast, Russia
- Designer: David Begalov
- Type: sculptural composition
- Material: bronze
- Completion date: 2010
- Opening date: 2010
- Dedicated to: “Fat and Thin”

The sculptural composition Fat and Thin is a monument in Taganrog town of the Rostov Region that is illustrating the characters of a satirical short story by Anton Chekhov “Fat and Thin”. The monument was constructed in 2010. Its author is sculptor David Begalov.

== History ==
The story related to the sculpture was written by A.P. Chekhov in 1883. It describes two classmates who meet at the Nikolaevsky station. One of them, Misha, is described as a fat man satisfied with his lifestyle and destiny. Another character, Porphyry is a thin and weedy man, busy caring for his family and life.

During the conversation it Emerges that the thin man is an office chairman with a low salary, and he has to cut out wooden cigarette cases to earn his living. Misha, on the other hand, has become a Privy Council member.

When each of the characters discover the social status of the other, The poorer of the two changes his behavior dramatically. Chekhov describes the following: “The thin man turned pale and rigid all at once, but soon his face twisted in all directions in the broadest smile; it seemed as though sparks were flashing from his face and eyes. He squirmed; he doubled together, crumpled up…” Porphyry could not stop his habit of being obsequious. In the story, Chekhov shows how social status influences people’s attitudes and other stereotypical ways of thinking.

== Composition ==
The friends’ meeting is depicted by the sculptural composition. It was constructed in 2010 in Taganrog on the Gogol Lane near the “Chekhov Shop” museum. The composition is made of bronze and installed on a low pedestal. It shows the thin man, the fat man and the thin man’s wife, and son. Despite the fact there is no description of the characters, The sculptor David Begalov managed to express their social status through their position. The small cringing official is constructed in a crunched pose that helps to express his respectfulness to the privy council member, who is shown as a wealthy man in fine costume holding a walking stick. His pose shows self-assurance after having eaten a satisfying meal in the restaurant. The thin man’s wife and son are listening to the former friends' have a conversation with great interest.
