= Burning Buildings =

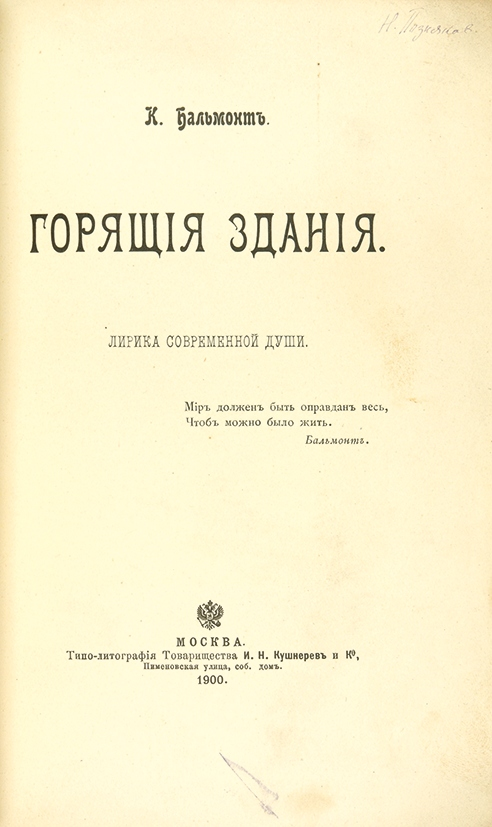
- 1900 cover
- Author: Konstantin Balmont
- Original title: Горящие здания
- Publication date: 1900
- Publication place: Russian Empire
- Media type: Print
- Preceded by: Silence
- Followed by: Let Us Be Like the Sun

Burning Buildings (Russian: Горящие здания /pre-1917: Горящiя зданiя, romanized: Goryashchiye zdaniya, subtitled: Lyric of the Modern Soul, Russian: Лирика современной души) is the fifth book by Russian Silver Age modernist poet Konstantin Balmont. It was first published in 1900 by Scorpion in Moscow and made its author famous across his country.

The collection comprised 131 poems, most of them written in late 1899 at the house of the publisher and close friend Sergey Poliakov. The Burning Buildings' second edition came as part of an anthology entitled The Collection of Poems (Собрание стихов) which came out in 1904 in Moscow. The book's third edition was included into the Complete Poems (Moscow, Scorpion, 1908). Its fourth and fifth editions followed in 1914 and 1917, respectively.

== History ==
As Balmont wrote in 1899, the whole collection has been created "under the spell of one single emotional wave" which turned his "life into a fairytale."

I found myself caught up in a single wave of passion, got enraptured and carried on by it, being thrown up and down, unable to break free until I managed to straddle it by way of understanding its meaning. The book is called The Lyric of Modern Soul and that is not some vacuous metaphor. While never cultivating artificial infatuation with what is now called modern world, which lived in other forms many times, I've never shut myself from voices coming from the past and, inevitably, the future... In this book I speak not just for myself but for many others who've got no voice and keep numb... but still are able to feel the burden of fatal conflicts even stronger than myself.

According to critic M. Stakhova, "The author saw his artistic mission in "discovering new amalgams of ideas, colours and sounds." His main ideology in those times revolved around the idea of creating "a lyric of the modern soul," the one with many facets, but also self-liberation and self-knowledge." Balmont was apparently looking for a new character, 'genius of Elements' and 'superhero'. Yet, sending the book to Leo Tolstoy, he wrote: "This is but one long scream of a soul, torn apart, lowly and, if you like, ugly. But I'll repudiate not a single page of it, not until I cease loving ugliness no lesser than I love harmony."

== Reception ==
Prince Alexander Urusov whose opinion was crucial for Balmont, did not appreciate the poet's new, aggressive brand of modernism, abhorring what he called "the extremes of decadence." Nikolai Gumilyov greeted Balmont's new development; in the article called "Leaders of the New School", praised the emergence of "all those hunchbacks, demons, all things beastly and perverse that have swept away the horde of old words, all those romances and dreaming, girls and boys, flowers and sunrises."
