= Under the Northern Sky (poetry collection) =

1894 book of poetry by Konstantin Balmont

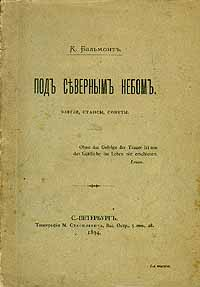
- Author: Konstantin Balmont
- Original title: Под северным небом
- Language: Russian
- Genre: Russian Symbolism
- Publication date: 1894
- Publication place: Russian Empire
- Media type: Print (hardback & paperback)
- Followed by: In Boundlessness

Under the Northern Sky (Russian: Под се′верным не′бом, romanized: Pod severnym nebom) is a collection of poetry by Konstantin Balmont featuring 51 poems, first published in the early 1894 in Saint Petersburg. Formally Balmont's second book, it is considered to be his debut, since all the copies of the Yaroslavl-released Collection of Poems (Сборник стихотворений, 1890) have been purchased and destroyed by the author.

== History ==
In December 1893 Balmont informed his friend, Nikolai Minsky in a letter: "Wrote the whole lot of the new poems and in January am going to start the process of publishing a book. Expect some chastising from my liberal friends, for there is no liberalism in them, with the 'degrading' motives aplenty."

The collection's general mood was captured in an epigraph, from the Austrian poet Nikolaus Lenau: "All the divine things enter my life invariably accompanied by sorrow." The Brockhaus and Efron Encyclopedic Dictionary later described the book as full of "greyness, hopelessness and gloom." Yet, Balmont's misgivings proved groundless: the reaction to the publication was positive. Critics liked the musical quality of his poetry, exquisiteness of form and the sense of tension which enlivened the general atmosphere of gloom.

== Notable poems ==
- "Choln tomlenya" (Чёлн томленья, Boat of Longing). Dedicated to Prince Alexander Ivanovich Urusov, a lawyer and philanthropist who supported and encouraged Balmont. "Urusov helped my soul to break the chains, to recognize my own self," wrote Balmont later in the Mountain Peaks. The poem became famous but drew mixed response. Zinaida Gippius considered it the epitom of vacuous pretentiousness, and once famously ridiculed its most 'sonorous' line: "chuzhdy charam chorny choln" ("charms-defying black boat").
- "Fantazia" (Фантазия). One of the first poems by Balmont, first published in Severny Vestnik in October 1893, soon after the author met Merezhkovsky and Minsky for the first time.
- "Lunny svet" (Лунный свет, Moonlight). This sonnet's rhythm and structure were lavishly praised by Ellis, one of Russian Symbolism's theoreticians, in his book Russian Symbolists.
