= Mirra Lokhvitskaya =

Russian poet (1869–1905)

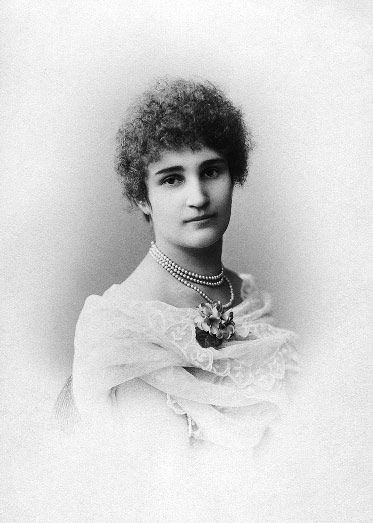
- Lokhvitskaya in the 1880s
- Born: Maria Alexandrovna Lokhvitskaya; November 19, 1869; Saint Petersburg, Russia
- Died: August 27, 1905 (aged 35); Saint Petersburg, Russia
- Occupation: Poet
- Spouse: Eugeny Gibert
- Writing career
- Notable awards: Pushkin Prize

Mirra Lokhvitskaya (Russian: Ми́рра Ло́хвицкая; born Maria Alexandrovna Lokhvitskaya; Russian: Мари́я Алекса́ндровна Ло́хвицкая; December 1 [O.S. November 19] 1869 – 9 September [O.S. August 27] 1905) was a Russian poet who rose to fame in the late 1890s. In her lifetime, she published five books of poetry, the first and the last of which received the prestigious Pushkin Prize. Due to the erotic sensuality of her works, Lokhvitskaya was regarded as the "Russian Sappho" by her contemporaries, which did not correspond with her conservative life style of dedicated wife and mother of five sons. Forgotten in Soviet times, in the late 20th century Lokhvitskaya's legacy was re-assessed and she came to be regarded as one of the most original and influential voices of the Silver Age of Russian Poetry, and the first in the line of modern Russian women poets who paved the way for Anna Akhmatova and Marina Tsvetaeva.

== Biography ==
Maria Lokhvitskaya was born on November 19, 1869, in Saint Petersburg, Russia. Her father Alexander Vladimirovich Lokhvitsky (1830–1884) was a well-known lawyer of the time, famous for his public speeches, the author of several academic works on jurisprudence. The primary source of young Maria's creative aspirations, though, was her mother Varvara Alexandrovna (née Hoer), a well-educated Frenchwoman, fond of literature and poetry. Lokhvitskaya's younger sister Nadezhda would later become a well-known humorist writer better known as Teffi, their brother Nikolay Lokhvitsky (1868–1933), a Russian White Army general and a one-time associate of Aleksandr Kolchak, fought against the Red Army forces in Siberia. Another sister Yelena Lokhvitskaya (1874–1919) wrote poetry, translated Maupassant (together with Teffi) and was a Drama Society member, but never regarded herself professional. Of Mirra's two other sisters, only the names are known: Varvara Alexandrovna (Popova, in marriage) and Lydia Alexandrovna (Kozhina).

In 1874, the Lokhvitsky family moved to Moscow. In 1882, Maria enrolled in the Moscow Aleksandrinsky Institute, from which she graduated in 1888. Some sources stated that her literature tutor was Apollon Maykov but modern literary historians challenge this. At age fifteen, Lokhvitskaya started writing poetry and published two of her poems as a small brochure (approved by the college's authorities) not long before graduation. In 1884, Alexander Lokhvitsky died and his widow took the children back to Saint Petersburg. Maria followed suit four years later, now as a young teacher. In 1888, several of her poems, signed M. Lokhvitskaya, were published by Sever (North) magazine. Several popular literary journals became interested in the young debutante and soon the moniker "Mirra" emerged. A family legend proposes that it had to do with her dying grandfather Kondrat's mysterious parting words: "...and the smell of myrrh is blown away by the wind."

=== Literary career ===
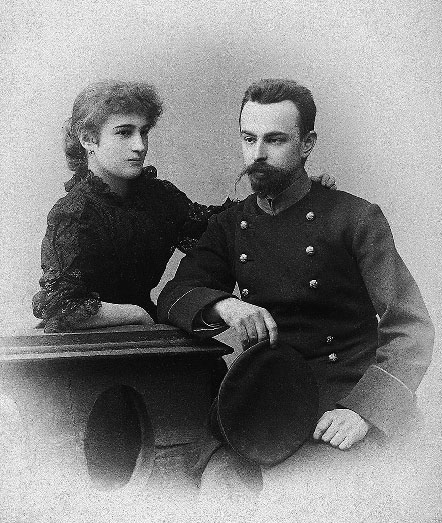
Mirra and Eugeny Gibert

Lokhvitskaya rose to fame in 1891 after her first long poem, "By the Seaside" (У моря), appeared in the August issue of the Russkoye Obozrenye (Russian Review) magazine. She became a popular figure in the Petersburg literary circles and became friends with Vsevolod Solovyov, Ieronim Yasinsky, Vasily Nemirovich-Danchenko, Pyotr Gnedich, and Vladimir Solovyov. In late 1891, Lokhvitskaya married Eugeny Gibert, a French construction engineer, and the couple moved first to Yaroslavl, then to Moscow. They had five sons.

Lokhvitskaya's first major book, a collection called Poems, 1889–1895 (Стихотворения, 1889–1895), drew positive response and brought her the prestigious Pushkin Prize in 1896, a year after its publication. "Never since Fet has a single poet managed to get a grip of their readership in such a way," wrote her friend Vasily Nemirovich-Danchenko. Volume II (1896–1898) followed in 1898 and two years later was re-issued, coupled with the first volume, in The Complete... edition.

In the course of the next few years, Lokhvitskaya published dozens of new poems, including the extensive Him and Her. Two Words (Он и Она. Два слова) and two epic dramas, Eastward (На пути к Востоку) and Vandelin. Springtime Fairytale. By the time her Volume III (1898–1900) came out, Lokhvitskaya was Russia's most popular and best-loved woman poet. Far from enjoying her stardom, though, she spent the last five years of her life in physical pain and mental turmoil.

=== Death ===
The exact cause of Lokhvitskaya's death remains unknown. Her health started to deteriorate in the late 1890s: she complained of insomnia and violent nightmares, suffered from bouts of severe depression, and later experienced chronic and ever worsening stenocardia. In 1904 Lokhvitskaya's illness progressed; she was bedridden for most of the year, tortured by pain and anxiety. In the early days of summer 1905, the family moved her to Finland, where her condition improved slightly, but on return she was hospitalized.

Mirra Lokhvitskaya died on August 27, 1905. Tuberculosis has often been cited as the cause of death, but this claim remained unsubstantiated and there was no mention of it in any of the obituaries. On August 29, Lokhvitskaya was interred in Alexander Nevsky Lavra's Dukhovskaya Church, a small group of relatives and friends attending the ceremony. Among those absent was Konstantin Balmont whom she had been passionately in love with. It was the stress of this strange relationship that, as some believed, had triggered her psychological crisis, and led to moral and physical demise. "Her death was enigmatic. Spiritual disturbance was the cause," Lokhvitskaya's friend Isabella Grinevskaya wrote in her memoirs.

=== Relationship with Konstantin Balmont ===
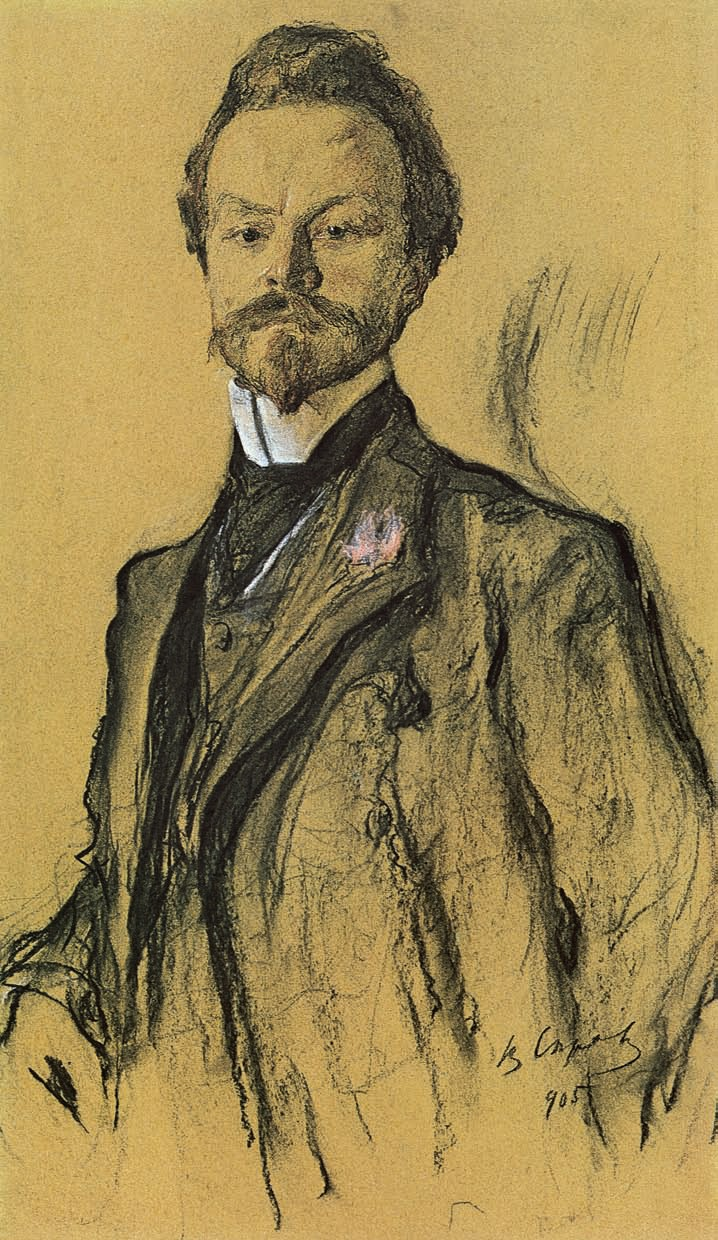
Konstantin Balmont

Lokhvitskaya and Balmont met for the first time in the mid-1890s, in Crimea. Sharing similar views on poetry in general, and its symbolist line of development in particular, they soon became close friends. What followed, though, was not a trivial affair, but a peculiar and obscure poetic dialogue full of allusions, to decipher the details of which one had to examine the whole bulk of the heritage of both poets. In Lokhvitskaya's poetry her lover figured as 'Lionel', after the character of Percy Bysshe Shelley (it was Balmont who translated into Russian most of the Englishman's poetry in the 1890s), a "youth with curls coloured ripen rye" and "eyes greenish like the sea".

This affair instigated public discussion and was often referred to as 'scandalous'. Whether Lokhvitskaya and Balmont had ever been physically close, remained unclear. Some suggested they might have had a short affair in the early days; in the later years even in the geographical terms both were wide apart, with Balmont spending much of his time abroad. In his autobiography At the Dawn (На заре) he described their relationship as 'poetic friendship'. Modern literary historians consider their relationship to have been truly platonic affair, albeit violently passionate, frustrating and psychologically detrimental for both.

In 1901, Balmont and Lokhvitskaya met, apparently, for the last time. Thereafter, their relationship was confined to enigmatically constructed poetic dialogues, full of demands and threats on his part and pleas for mercy on hers. Apparently both were taking their shared self-created world of horror and passion seriously. Balmont was continuously complaining in his letters of being 'possessed', while Lokhvitskaya submerged herself in a quagmire of violent visions which, coupled with feelings of guilt towards her family, might have led to an illness the roots of which were obviously psychosomatic. Some (Alexandrova included) regard the involvement of Valery Bryusov, Balmont's close rival/friend to be the most damaging factor. The well-publicized fact that Bryusov (who hated Lokhvitskaya, thinking she was trying to 'steal' a friend of his) dabbled in black magic added a gothic touch to the whole affair.

== Personality ==
People who knew Lokhvitskaya personally later spoke of the stark contrast between the poet's 'bacchanal' reputation and her real life persona. The author fond of erotic imagery (whom some critics labeled 'pornographer') in reality was, according to Ivan Bunin, "the most chaste woman in Saint Petersburg, a faithful wife and most caring, protective mother of several children." Playing 'Eastern beauty' at home, she received visitors lying languidly on a couch. Still, according to Bunin, there was not a trace of pretentiousness behind this posturing; on the contrary, the hostess greatly enjoyed matter-of-fact chattering about funny and trivial things, displaying wit and disarming self-irony.

In the circle of her literary friends, Lokhvitskaya was surrounded by 'aura of adoration'; it seemed as if every man, according to a biographer, "was a little in love with her." Among them was Bunin. In a by and large grim gallery of his literary portraits (most of them crude caricatures), Lokhvitskaya was the only person whom he remembered fondly. "Everything in her was charming: the sound of her voice, the liveliness of her speech, the glitter of her eye, her wonderful facetiousness. The colour of her face was exceptionally beautiful: opaque and smooth, like that of a ripe Crimean apple," Bunin wrote in his memoirs.

Lokhvitskaya was reticent, attended literary parties on just rare occasions and her appearances there were not necessarily triumphant. "As she entered the stage, there was such a look of helplessness about her as to take away all the attractiveness," wrote the religious author Evgeny Pogozhev (Poselyanin), remembering one such evening. Lokhvitskaya's shyness was one of the reasons why so little mention has been made of her in the extensive body of Russian Silver Age memoirs. Influential critic Akim Volynsky once confessed: "Sadly, Lokhvitskaya, one of the most intriguing women of the time, left but a vague trace in my memory."

Good looks certainly played a part, first in Lokhvitskaya's meteoric rise to fame, then in the way people "refused to see beyond her beauty, remaining oblivious to the sharp intelligence that was becoming more and more obvious in her work." According to Alexandrova, Lokhvitskaya's was a "typical drama of a good-looking woman in whom most people failed o recognize anything beyond her physical attractiveness."

== Legacy ==
Mirra Lokhvitskaya's poetry on the face of it wasn't innovative; contemporary critics praised it for lightness of touch, rare musical quality and occasionally dazzling technical perfection. In retrospect it turned out that Lochvitskaya's work bore one profoundly novel element, what one critic called "the outright celebration of female worldview." In that respect Lokhvitskaya is now considered the founder of Russian woman's poetry and a predecessor to such groundbreaking figures as Anna Akhmatova and Marina Tsvetaeva. Another original aspect of Lokhvitskaya's poetry was its unusual frankness; she was the first woman in Russian literature to enjoy total freedom of self-expression, speaking openly of sensuality, passion and sex. The famous phrase "Lasciviousness equals happiness" (Eto stchastye – sladostrastye) summed up her attitude and has been often quoted as her chosen 'signature line'.

But while passions of love remained the leitmotif of Lokhvitskaya's poetry, its context was transforming in quick and dramatic fashion, making the decade of her reign in Russian poetry an intriguing field for literary research. The critic and author Semyon Vengerov who rated her among the 'outstanding Russian poets' wrote (in Brockhaus and Efron Encyclopedic Dictionary):

The history of Lokhvitskaya's literary eroticism can be divided into three periods. Her first volume, for all its touches of cynicism, is marked by gracious naivety. "Sweet songs of love" there are aplenty, but they are addressed to her husband who brought her "happiness and joy". In Volume II this hue of self-conscious teenager's delight disappears without a trace. The lady singer turns extremely sultry... Volume III brings her into the third and final phase with darkness choking the light. There is no joy anymore: hopelessness, suffering and death is what Lokhvitskaya becomes preoccupied with. Lucid simplicity is gone, giving way to decorative quirkiness, with plots becoming increasingly subtle and exquisite.

There wasn't a trace of lasciviousness left in the last, fifth volume. Lokhvitskaya excluded all poems addressed to her "spiritual lover," and what was left amounted to a fine collection of elegies full of dark premonitions, quasi-religious fables and thinly veiled farewells to her children. After her death in 1905, the lines of a late 1890s poem which sounded like a perfect epitaph have often been quoted:

Я хочу умереть молодой.
Золотой закатиться звездой.
Облететь неувядшим цветком.
Я хочу умереть молодой...
...
Пусть не меркнет огонь до конца
И останется память о той,
Что для жизни будила сердца.
Я хочу умереть молодой!

Translation:

I'd rather die young
Tumble down like a star of gold
Drop like a flower that's fresh
I'd rather die young

For the fires to burn till the end
And memories forever remain
Of the one who disturbed people's hearts in order to bring them to life
I'd rather die young

There were numerous misconceptions about Lokhvitskaya, according to Vengerov who refused to see in her a 'decadent' poet. "Totally devoid of sickly feebleness and vain extravagance" (generally associated with the Russian decadent movement), she was, "eager to enjoy life, declaring her right to put forth her feelings with all the mighty fullness of her soul," he maintained. In fact, "the poetess's agility was very much akin to the challenges of Marxism," opined the critic (a Marxist himself), while her "views on the meaning and reason of life belonged to the Oriental tradition," even if "channeled through a narrow love theme." If there was one thing in Lokhvitskaya's poetry that riled most of her contemporaries, that was her almost demonstrative lack of social awareness.

Some saw her as a quintessentially mystic poet. Vyacheslav Ivanov, speaking of Lokhvitskaya's enigma, marveled at her "almost antiquely harmonious nature." "She accepted Christianity with all the joy of unbroken soul of pagan outsider, responding to Christian demands with her wholesome, natural kindness," according to Ivanov. Typecasting her as an 'original' (as opposed to 'proto-modern') 'bacchanal character', he wrote:

...As a true bacchanal woman she was carrying in herself a fatally polarized outlook. Passion calls for and is responded to by death; pleasure brings pain. The beauty of erotic love and the demonic horrors of violence inspired her in equal measure. With daring curiosity she poised over abysses of torture. Possessed by the devilish charms of the Middle Ages, she ecstatically turned into one of those witches who've known all the joys of Sabbaths and burning fires...

The modern scholar Tatyana Alexandrova (author of Mirra Lokhvitskaya: Doomed to Melt in Flight, 2008) too saw the poet more as mystic seer than 'sultry songstress.' Quoting Lokhvitskaya's short poem (written in 1902, long before even the First Russian revolution):

Мне ненавистен красный цвет
За то, что проклят он.
В нем – преступленья долгих лет,
В нем – казнь былых времен...

Translation:

I hate the colour Red
For it's forever cursed
In it – all crimes of times gone by
Death sentences of the Past...

...she opined that "...this poem was in itself a good enough reason for Lokhvitskaya's legacy to remain unpublished in the Soviet times."

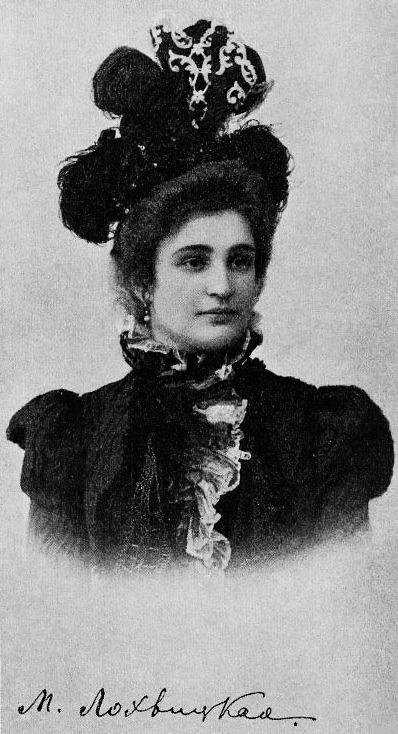
Lokhvitskaya in 1901

The Silver Age critic Alexander Izmaylov (writing in 1905) rated Lokhvitskaya as the greatest Russian woman poet ever ("or, rather, the only one, due to lack of competition"). "Full of fiery passions, yet occasionally sickly nervous, she entered this world as a strange amalgam of Heaven and Earth, flesh and spirituality, sinfulness and saintly aspirations, lowlife delights and longings for a higher plane, the future Kingdom of Beauty," he wrote. Still, Izmaylov recognized in Lokhvitskaya's poetry a kind of flatness, s narrow-mindedness which was becoming more and more obvious with the years.

Mikhail Gershenzon deplored the way Lokhvitskaya has been totally misunderstood by the general readership; only "those enchanted by the subtle aromas of poetry, its musicality, easily recognized her exceptional gift." Speaking of the posthumous compilation Before the Sunset (Перед Закатом), he wrote: "She could rarely fulfill all of her ideas in one piece, but her poetic designs worked best when she herself wasn't aware of their inner meaning. In the art of bringing individual verses, lines even, to perfection, she had no equal. It looks as if not a single Russian poet has ever come as close as she did to Pushkin's lucid clarity, her verses being easily as catchy." Summarizing Lokhvitskaya's development over the years, Gershenzon wrote: "While in her earlier poems there prevailed a 'hurry up, lover, my oil is burning' kind of motif, her latter works documented the process of her soul getting deeper and quieter. As if the moment she spotted this mysterious pattern of things beyond the passions adorning human life's fanciful facade, walls opened wide to let her see through into the unfathomable space."

The popularity of Mirra Lokhvitskaya's poetry waned quickly after his death. Igor Severyanin became fascinated with her and even called his fantasy world Mirralliya, but in the 1920s Lokhvitskaya's name slipped into oblivion. Both the Soviet and the Russian immigrant critics labeled the author and her works "narrow-minded, trivial, saloon-wise and vulgar." The often quoted words of Valery Bryusov – "The future complete anthology of Russian poetry will feature some 10–15 of Lokhvitskaya's truly flawless poems..." – were only part of his statement, the second half of which ("...but the attentive reader will be forever excited by and engaged in the hidden drama of this poet's soul that has marked the whole of her poetry") was invariably omitted. For more than ninety years Lokhvitskaya remained unpublished in her homeland.

In the early 1990s, things started to change. The Dictionary of Russian Women Writers (1994) admitted that Lokhvitskaya's "influence on her contemporaries and on later poets is only beginning to be recognized." The American slavist V. F. Markov called Lokhvitskaya's legacy "a treasury of prescience", suggesting that it was her and not Akhmatova who "taught [Russian] women how to speak." "Her poetic world might have been narrow, but shallow – never," biographer Alexandrova asserted. It is just that, according to Vyacheslav Ivanov, this depthness wasn't obvious: "the depth of hers was that of a sunlit well, unseen to the untutored eye."

In the 2000s, several songs based upon the poetry of Mirra Lokhvitskaya were written by Larisa Novoseltseva.

== Sources ==
- "Лохвицкая, Мирра Александровна" . Brockhaus and Efron Encyclopedic Dictionary (in Russian). 1906.

== Links ==
- Mirra Lokhvitskaya Website (Russian)
- Works by Mirra Lokhvitskaya at LibriVox (public domain audiobooks)
- Mirra Lokhvitskaya Poems (Translations)
