= Union of Russian Writers and Journalists in Paris =

Russian émigré writers' and journalists' organization in Paris

The Union of Russian Writers and Journalists in Paris (Russian: Союз русских писателей и журналистов в Париже) was a literary organization formed in July 1920. In 1921 Ivan Bunin was elected its first chairman, to be succeeded a year later by Pavel Milyukov who held this post for many years. Another stalwart was Vladimir Zeeler, the Union's secretary for thirty years.

Among the members of the Union's executive committee were Alexey N. Tolstoy, Sergey Polyakov, D.S. Mirsky; later Alexander Yablonovsky, Konstantin Balmont, Valentin Bulgakov, Alexander Kuprin, Mark Slonim, Sergey Varshavsky, Sergei Efron, Boris Zaytsev, Ivan Shmelyov, Mark Aldanov, Don-Aminado, Nadezhda Teffi, Sasha Chyorny, Kirill Zaytsev, Vadim Rudnev. The Union had no publication of its own, the works of its members were published mostly by the Petropolis Publishers, as well as Sovremennye zapiski (Contemporary Notes) magazine and Vozrozhdenye (Revival) newspaper. As the Nazi German troops entered Paris, the Union of Russian Writers and Journalists in Paris disbanded.
