= Silence (Balmont) =

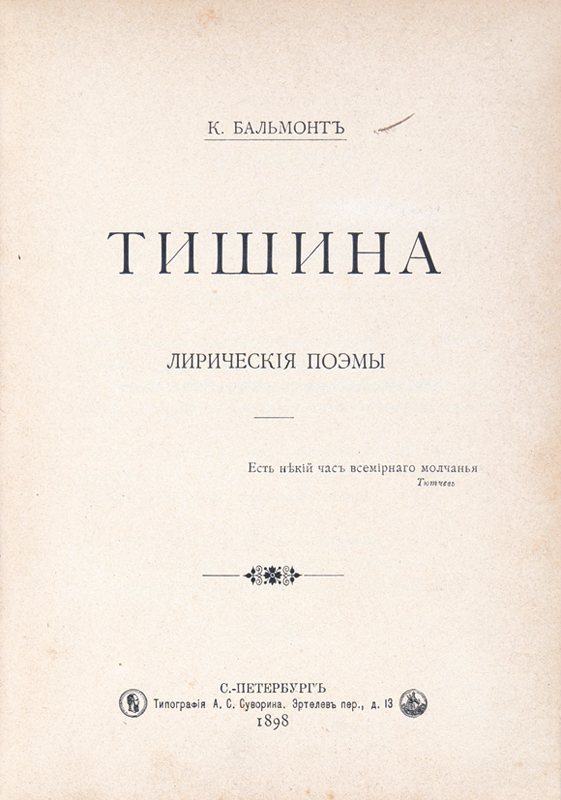
- Author: Konstantin Balmont
- Original title: Тишина. Лирические поэмы
- Language: Russian
- Genre: Russian Symbolism
- Publication date: 1898
- Publication place: Russian Empire
- Media type: Print (hardback & paperback)
- Preceded by: In Boundlessness
- Followed by: Burning Buildings

Silence (Russian: Тишина, romanized: Tishina, subtitled "Lyric poems", Лирические поэмы) is the third poetry collection by Konstantin Balmont, first published in August 1898 in Saint Petersburg, by Alexey Suvorin's Publishing House. Following In Boundlessness (1895), it features 77 poems, most of which were based upon the author's impressions of his 1896-1897 European journey which took him to Germany, France, Italy and Great Britain, where he read Russian poetry in Oxford. The book's epigraph, "There is some kind of universal hour of silence" (Есть некий час всемирного молчанья) comes from Fyodor Tyutchev's poem "Videniye" (The Vision, Видение).

The book, divided into several cycles, was constructed as if it were a musical composition, poems linked both rhythms and inner associations. It bore the first marks of Nietzschean motifs and heroes, notably the "Elemental Genius," who transcends his own humanity in order to break free from all restrictions. Silence was praised by Prince Alexander Urusov who recognized it as a work of a great talent who was beginning to forge his very own, distinctive style in poetry.

== Notable poems ==
- "Dead Ships" (Мёртвые корабли, Myortvye korabli), dated 9 December 1895, is a seven-part poem, marked with sharp variations of moods and rhythms. It was written in the days when the drama of the Fridtjof Nansen's Fram expedition (1893-1896) was in the focus of the world media's attention. Balmont saw the North Pole as a symbol of unattainable Absolute and Nansen's endeavor as an ultimate challenge of human spirit. The epigraph for the poem comes from Elena Blavatskaya's book Voice of Silence: "The Soul, before it starts to learn and dares to recollect, has to merge with Silent Voice and wait until Voice of Silence starts speaking to inner mind."
- "Don Juan" (Дон Жуан). Fragments from the unfinished poem. Balmont's Juan sees riding waves of 'elemental passions' as a dangerous but invigorating game worth giving his life for. He ends his journey, though, a devastated, tired man who'd lost every single sacred thing that he ever believed in, according to L.A. Kolobayeva ("Russian Symbolism").
