= Konstantin Balmont =

Russian poet (1867–1942)

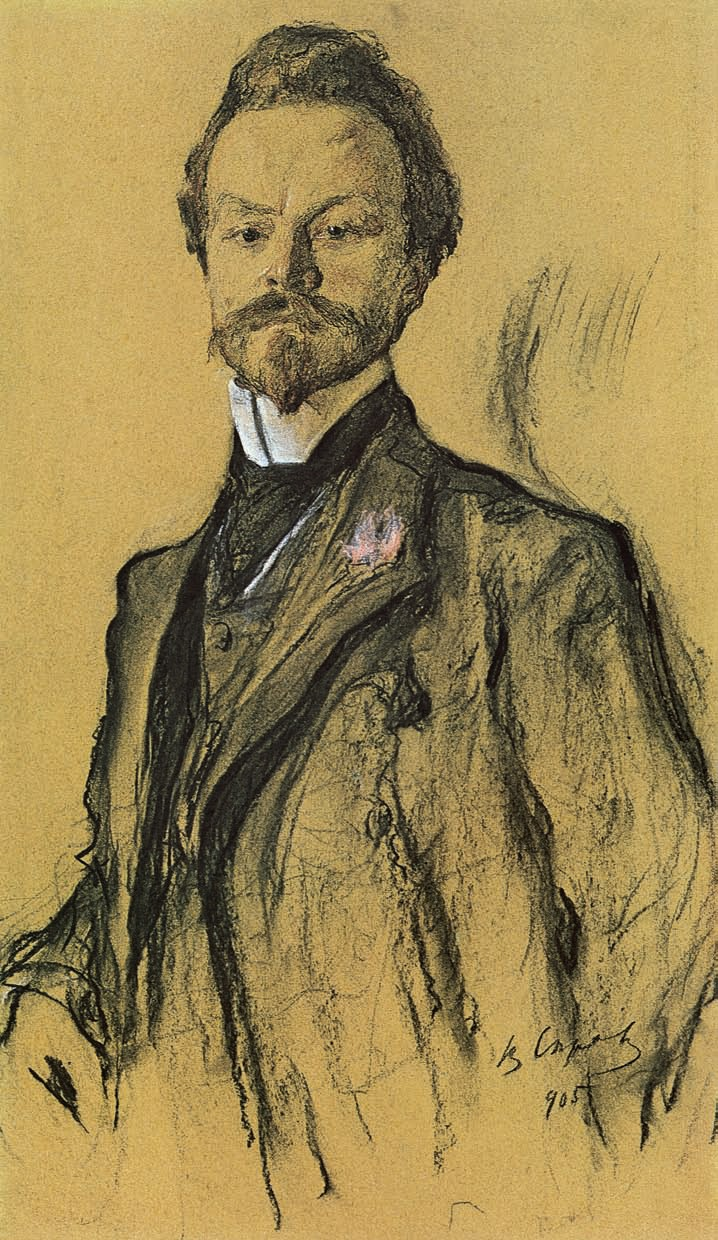
- Portrait by Valentin Serov, 1905
- Born: Konstantin Dmitrievich Balmont; 15 June [O.S. 3 June] 1867; Shuya, Russia
- Died: 23 December 1942 (aged 75); Paris, France
- Citizenship: Russia, France
- Education: Moscow University (dropped out)
- Occupation: Poet
- Spouses: Larisa Garelina; Yekaterina Andreeva
- Partners: Dagmar Shahovskoy; Elena Tzvetkovskaya
- Writing career
- Period: 1885–1937
- Genres: Poetry; memoirs; political essay
- Notable works: Burning Buildings (1900); Let Us Be Like the Sun (1903)
- Movement: Russian symbolism

Konstantin Dmitriyevich Balmont (Russian: Константин Дмитриевич Бальмонт; 15 June [O.S. 3 June] 1867 – 23 December 1942) was a Russian symbolist poet and translator who became one of the major figures of the Silver Age of Russian Poetry.

Balmont's early education came from his mother, who knew several foreign languages, valued literature and theater, and exerted a strong influence on her son. He then attended two gymnasiums, being expelled from the first for political activities and graduating from the second. He started studying law at the Imperial Moscow University in 1886 but was quickly expelled for taking part in student unrest. He tried again at the Demidov Law College from 1889 but dropped out in 1890.

In February 1889, Balmont married Larisa Mikhailovna Garelina. Unhappy in marriage, on 13 March 1890 he attempted suicide by jumping from a third-storey window, resulting in a limp and an injured writing hand for the rest of his life. He became involved in two other common-law marriages and attempted suicide a second time in 1909.

Balmont wrote poetry and prose prolifically and published his works to wide audiences in Imperial Russia. After the Bolshevik revolution he emigrated in 1920 and had a smaller following in exile. He translated the works of other writers, including Edgar Allan Poe. He was thought of among the pre-revolutionary Russian intellectual milieu as an innovative poet and enjoyed friendships with many of his fellow Russian emigrant poets. He died of pneumonia in France in 1942.

== Biography ==
Konstantin Balmont was born at his family's estate, Gumnishchi, in Shuya, then part of Vladimir Governorate, the third of seven sons of a Russian nobleman, lawyer, and senior state official, Dmitry Konstantinovich Balmont, and Vera Nikolayevna (née Lebedeva) who came from a military family. The latter knew several foreign languages, was enthusiastic about literature and theater, and exerted a strong influence on her son. Balmont learned to read at the age of five and cited Alexander Pushkin, Nikolay Nekrasov, Aleksey Koltsov, and Ivan Nikitin as his earliest influences. Later he remembered the first ten years of his life spent at Gumnishchi with great affection and referred to the place as 'a tiny kingdom of silent comfort'.

In 1876, the family moved to Shuya where Vera Nikolayevna owned a two-story house. At age ten Konstantin joined the local gymnasium, an institution he later described as "the home of decadence and capitalism, good only at air and water contamination." It was there that he became interested in French and German poetry and started writing himself. His first two poems were criticized by his mother in such a way that for the next six years he made no further attempt at writing poetry. At the gymnasium Balmont became involved with a secret circle (formed by students and some teachers) which printed and distributed Narodnaya Volya proclamations. "I was happy and I wanted everybody to be happy. The fact that only a minority, myself included, were entitled to such happiness, seemed outrageous to me," he later wrote. On 30 June 1886, he was expelled from the Shuya gymnasium for his political activities.

Vera Nikolayevna transferred her son to a Vladimir gymnasium, but here the boy had to board with a Greek language teacher who took upon himself the duty of a warden. In late 1885, Balmont made his publishing debut: three of his poems appeared in the popular Saint Petersburg magazine Zhivopisnoe obozrenie. This event (according to biographer Viktor Bannikov) "was noticed by nobody except for his [tor]mentor" (his mother) who forbade the young man to publish anything further.

In 1886, Balmont graduated from the much hated gymnasium ("It completely ruined my nervous system." he remembered in 1923). and enrolled in Moscow State University to study law. There he became involved with a group of leftist activists and was arrested for taking part in student unrest. He spent three days in jail, was expelled from the university, and returned home to Shuya. In 1889, Balmont returned to the university but soon quit again after suffering a nervous breakdown. He joined the Demidov Law College in Yaroslavl but dropped out in September 1890, deciding he'd had enough formal education. "I simply couldn't bring myself to study law, what with living so intensely through the passions of my heart," he wrote in 1911. In February 1889, he married Larisa Mikhailovna Garelina; unhappy in marriage, on 13 March 1890 Balmont attempted suicide by jumping from a third-story window, leaving him with a limp and an injured writing hand for the rest of his life. The year he spent recuperating from his suicide attempt became a turning point for Balmont, who, in his words, experienced 'extraordinary mental agitation' and envisaged his 'poetic mission.'

=== Debut ===
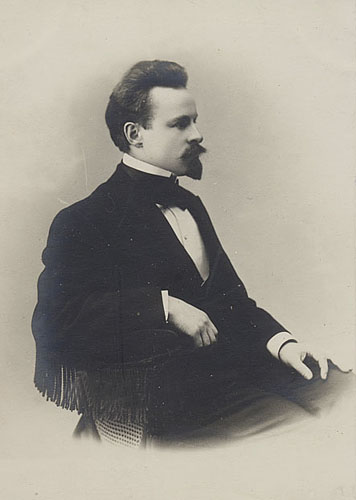
Balmont in the late 1880s

In 1890, Balmont released a self-financed book called Collection of Poems (Sbornik stikhotvoreny), which included some of the pieces published in 1885. Instrumental in helping the publication was Vladimir Korolenko, by then an established writer, who had received a handwritten notebook (sent to him by Konstantin's classmates) and sent back detailed and favorable critical analysis. He praised the schoolboy's eye for detail, warned against the occasional lapse of concentration, and advised him to "trust that unconscious part of the human soul which accumulates momentary impressions." "Should you learn to concentrate and work methodically, in due time we'll hear of your having developed into something quite extraordinary," were the last words of this remarkable letter. Balmont was greatly impressed with the famous writer's magnanimity and later referred to Korolenko as his 'literary godfather'. The book, though, proved to be a failure. Disgusted with it, Balmont purchased and burnt all the remaining copies. "My first book, of course, was a total failure. People dear to me have made this fiasco even less bearable with their negativism," he wrote in 1903, meaning apparently Larisa, but also his university friends who considered the book 'reactionary' and scorned its author for 'betraying the ideals of social struggle'. Again, Korolenko came to Balmont's aid: "The poor guy is very shy; more editorial attention to his work would make great difference," he wrote to Mikhail Albov, one of the editors of Severny Vestnik, in September 1891.

In 1888–1891, Balmont published several poems he translated from German and French. For a while, none of the literary journals showed interest in Balmont's own work.

Some crucial practical help came from Moscow University professor Nikolai Storozhenko. "Were it not for him, I would have died of hunger" Balmont later remembered. The professor accepted his essay on Percy Bysshe Shelley and in October 1892 introduced him to the authors of Severny Vestnik, including Nikolai Minsky, Dmitry Merezhkovsky, and Zinaida Gippius, as well as the publisher Kozma Soldatyonkov, who commissioned him to translate two fundamental works on the history of European literature. These books, published in 1894–1895, "fed me for three years, making it possible for me to fulfill all my poetic ambitions," Balmont wrote in 1922. All the while he continued to translate Shelley and Edgar Allan Poe. The lawyer and philanthropist, Prince Alexander Urusov, an expert in Western European literature, financed the publication of two of Poe's books, translated by Balmont. These translations are still held to be exemplary by modern Russian literary scholars. In 1894, Balmont met Valery Bryusov, who, impressed by the young poet's "personality and his fanatical passion for poetry," soon became his best friend.

=== 1893–1899 ===
In December 1893, Balmont informed Nikolai Minsky in a letter: "I've just written a series of my own poems and I am planning to start the publishing process in January. I anticipate my liberal friends will be outraged, for there's not much liberalism in this, while there are 'corrupting influences' aplenty." Under the Northern Sky (Под северным небом) came out in 1894 and marked the starting point in his literary career, several critics praising the young author's originality and versatility. The second collection, In Boundlessness (В безбрежности, 1895) saw Balmont starting to experiment with the Russian language's musical and rhythmical structures. Mainstream critics reacted coolly, but the Russian cultural elite of the time hailed the author as gifted innovator. Around this time, Balmont met and became close friends with Sergei Poliakov, Knut Hamsun's Russian translator and an influential literary entrepreneur (who in 1899 would launch the Scorpion publishing house). He also became a close friend of Bryusov, who had a formative influence on the development of Balmont's poetic and critical voice. In 1896, Balmont married Ekaterina Alekseyevna Andreeva, and the couple went abroad that year to travel through Western Europe. All the while Balmont was engaged in intensive self-education: he learned several languages and became an expert in various subjects like the Spanish art and Chinese culture. In the spring of 1897, Oxford University invited Balmont to read lectures on Russian poetry. "For the first time ever I've been given the opportunity to live my life totally in accord with my intellectual and aesthetic interests. I'll never get enough of this wealth of arts, poetry, and philosophical treasures", he wrote in a letter to critic Akim Volynsky. These European impressions formed the basis for Balmont's third collection Silence (Тишина, 1898).

=== 1900–1905 ===
After two years of continuous traveling, Balmont settled at Sergey Polyakov's Banki estate to concentrate on his next piece of work. In late 1899, he informed the poet Lyudmila Vilkina in a letter:

I write non-stop. My love of life grows and now I want to live forever. You won't believe how many new poems I've written: more than a hundred! It's madness, it's fantasy, and it's something new. The book I'm going to publish will be different. It will raise many eyebrows. My understanding of the state of things has totally changed. It may sound funny, but I'll tell you: now I understand how the world works. For many years [this understanding] will stay with me, hopefully forever.

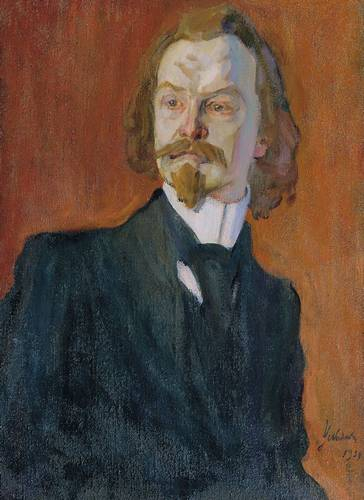
K. Balmont. A portrait by Nikolai Ulyanov (1909)

The book in question, Burning Buildings (Russian: Горящие здания, 1900), a collection of innovative verse aimed at "inner liberation and self-understanding," came to be regarded as an apex of Balmont's legacy. In it Balmont's Nietzschean individualism reached almost religious dimensions, typified by lines like: "O yes, I am the Chosen, I am the Wise, I am the Initiate / The Son of the Sun, I am a poet, the son of reason, I am emperor." In 1901, Balmont sent Leo Tolstoy a copy of it, saying in a letter: "This book is a prolonged scream of a soul caught in the process of being torn apart. One might see this soul as low or ugly. But I won't disclaim a single page of it as long I keep in me this love for ugliness which is as strong as my love of harmony." Burning Buildings made Balmont the most popular poet in the Russian Symbolist movement. He introduced formal innovations that were widely emulated in Russian verse, including melodic rhythms, abundant rhymes, and the meticulous organization of short lyric poems into narrative poems, cycles, and other units of composition. "For a decade he was a towering presence in Russian poetry. Others either meekly followed or struggled painfully to free themselves from his overbearing influence," wrote Valery Bryusov later. He was also known for his prolific output, which became seen as a shortcoming over time. "I churn out one page after another, hastily... How unpredictable one's soul is! One more look inside, and you see the new horizons. I feel like I've struck a goldmine. Should I keep on this way, I'll make a book that will never die," he wrote to Ieronim Yasinsky in 1900.

In March 1901, Balmont took part in a student demonstration on the square in front of Kazan Cathedral which was violently disrupted by police and Cossack units. Several days later, at a literary event in the Russian State Duma, he recited his new poem "The Little Sultan" (Malenkii sultan), a diatribe against Tsar Nicholas II, which then circulated widely in hand-written copies. As a result, Balmont was deported from the capital and banned for two years from living in university cities. On 14 March 1902, Balmont left Russia for Britain and France, lecturing at the Russian College of Social Sciences, Paris. While there he met Elena Konstantinovna Tsvetkovskaya, the daughter of a prominent general, who in 1905 became his third (common-law) wife. In 1903, Balmont returned to Russia, his administrative restrictions having been removed by Interior Minister von Plehve. Back in Moscow, he joined Bryusov and Polyakov in the founding of the journal Vesy ('The Scales'), published by Scorpion.

In 1903, Let Us Be Like the Sun. The Book of Symbols (Будем как Солнце. Книга Символов) came out to great acclaim. Alexander Blok called it "unique in its unfathomable richness." The same year, Balmont moved to the Baltic Sea shore to work on his next book, Only Love (Только любовь, 1903) which failed to surpass the success of the two previous books, but still added to the cult of Balmont. "Russia was passionately in love with him. Young men whispered his verses to their loved ones, schoolgirls scribbled them down to fill their notebooks," Teffi remembered. Established poets, like Mirra Lokhvitskaya, Valery Bryusov, Andrei Bely, Vyacheslav Ivanov, Maximilian Voloshin, and Sergey Gorodetsky, treated him (according to biographer Darya Makogonenko) as a "genius... destined to rise high above the world by submerging himself totally in the depths of his soul." In 1904 Balmont published his collected writings in prose as Mountain Peaks (Gornye vershiny).

In 1904–1905, Scorpion published a two-volume set of Balmont's collected works, followed in 1905 by the collection A Liturgy of Beauty. Elemental Hymns (Литургия красоты. Стихийные гимны) and A Fairy's Fairy Tales (Фейные сказки, both 1905). The first work dealt mostly with his impressions of the Russo-Japanese War, while the second was a children's book written for his daughter Nina Balmont. Neither collection was received as warmly as their predecessors; in retrospect many contemporaries recognized this as the beginning of Balmont's long decline as a poet. Back from his trip to Mexico and California, Balmont became involved in the 1905 street unrest, reciting poems on barricades and (according to Yekaterina Andreyeva) "carrying a pistol in his pocket wherever he went." Now friends with Maxim Gorky, he contributed both to the latter's New Life (Novaya zhizn) and Paris-based Red Banner (Krasnoye znamya) radical newspapers. On 31 December 1905, he fled to Paris to avoid arrest. Balmont's posturing as a political immigrant was ridiculed in Russia at the time, but years later researchers found evidence that the Russian secret police considered the poet a 'dangerous political activist' and tried to spy on him abroad. Balmont returned to Russia only in 1913 after an amnesty on the occasion of the 300th anniversary of the Romanov dynasty was declared.

=== 1906–1917 ===
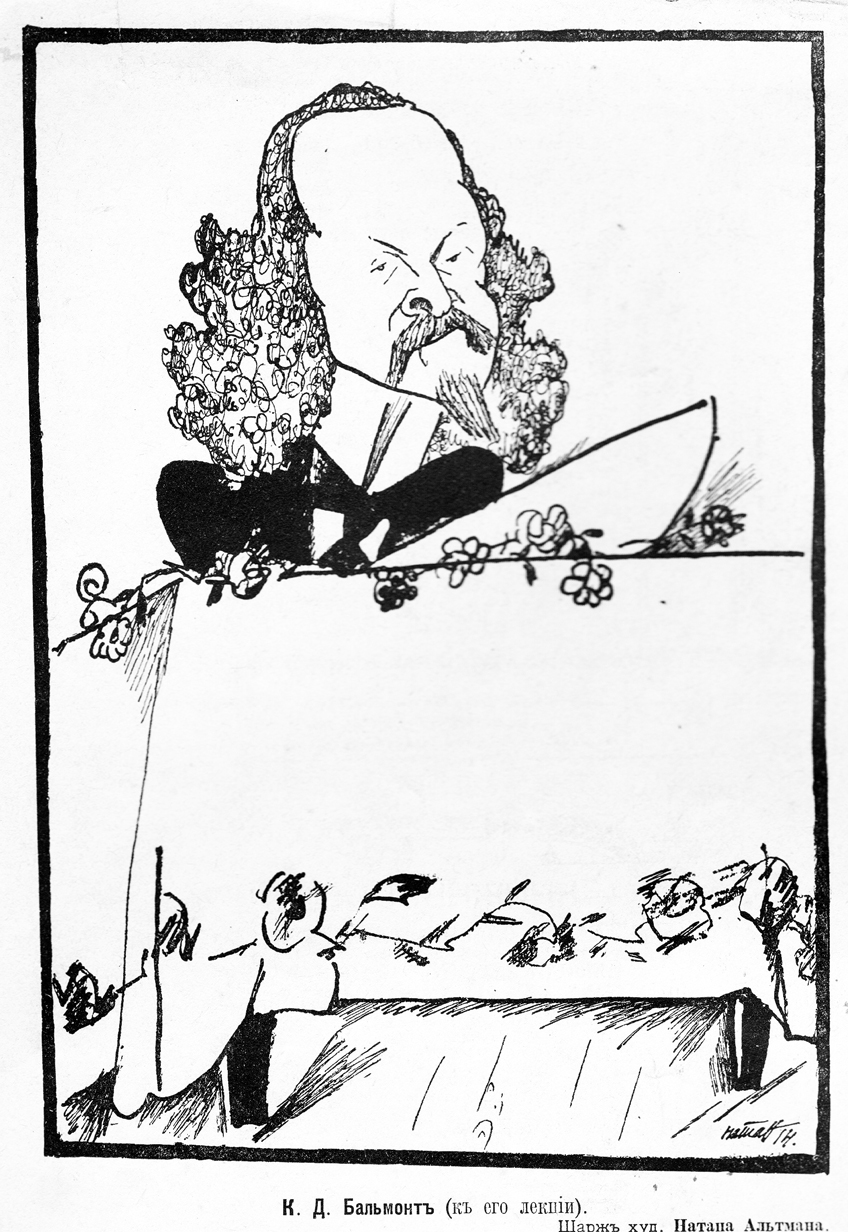
Balmont lecturing. Nathan Altman's caricature, 1914

Balmont's next two books collected poetry written during and in the wake of the First Russian Revolution. Inspired by Walt Whitman, who he was translating at the time, Balmont gathered his civic verse into the collection Poems (Стихотворения, 1906), which was immediately confiscated by the police. Songs of the Avenger (Песни мстителя, 1907), containing direct calls for the assassination of the Tsar, was banned in Russia, and published in Paris. Evil Charms (Злые чары, 1906) was banned for its allegedly anti-religious sentiments. In 1907–1912, Balmont traveled continuously. Snakes' Flowers (Zmeinye tsvety, 1910) and The Land of Osiris (Krai Ozirisa, 1914) collected his travel sketches. Then came the Russian folklore-oriented Firebird. Slav's Svirel (Жар-птица. Свирель славянина, 1907), Birds in the Air (Ptitsy v vozdukhe, 1908), Green Vertograd. Words Like Kisses (Зелёный вертоград. Слова поцелуйные, 1909) and The Glow of Dawns (Zarevo zor, 1912). In Ancient Calls (Зовы древности, 1909) Balmont adapted poems and inscriptions from a variety of ancient sources. Both critics and fellow poets (Bryusov among them) saw these post-1905 books as manifesting a deep creative crisis, of which the poet himself, apparently, remained unaware. Vladimir Markov later argued that Green Vertograd marked the start of a new ascent in Balmont's lyrical poetry, based on the reworking of folkloric material (mostly but not exclusively Russian in origin). A somewhat better reception awaited White Lightning (Белые зарницы, 1908) and Luminous Sea (Морское свечение, 1910), collections of his essays on Russian and foreign authors.

The outbreak of World War I found Balmont in France, and he had to make a long trip through the United Kingdom, Norway, and Sweden to return home in May 1915. In 1916 he traveled through the entire Empire, giving readings to large audiences and reached Japan, where he was also warmly received. During the war Balmont published Ash. The Vision of a Tree (Ясень. Видение древа, 1916) and 255 sonnets under the title Sonnets of the Sun, Honey, and the Moon (Сонеты Солнца, мёда и Луны, 1917). Both books were received warmly by the public, though the majority of critics found them monotonous and banal. Balmont also composed longer poems, including six garlands of sonnets. He made new friends, including the composers Alexander Scriabin and Sergei Prokofiev, collaborating with the latter on musical works. His 1915 volume Poetry as Magic gave the most coherent and influential statement of his theoretical positions on poetry. White Architect (1914) confirmed Balmont's return as a lyric poet; Markov underscores its more classical qualities of "energy, virility, solidity, and finish." In 1914, the publication of Balmont's Complete Works in ten volumes commenced.

=== 1917–1942 ===
Balmont welcomed the February Revolution and even entered the competition for a new Russian national anthem, but the failure of the Provisional Government and the October Revolution left him bitterly disappointed. He joined the Constitutional Democratic Party and praised Lavr Kornilov in one of his articles. He condemned the doctrine of the dictatorship of the proletariat as destructive and suppressing. Still, in his essay Am I a Revolutionary or Not?, he argued that a poet should keep away from political parties and keep "his individual trajectory which is more akin to that of a comet rather than a planet."

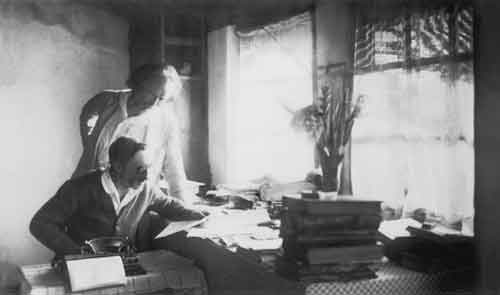
Ivan Shmelyov and (above him) Konstantin Balmont. 1926

1918–1920 were years of great hardship for Balmont who, living in Petrograd (with Elena Tsvetkovskaya and their daughter Mirra) had also to support Andreyeva and their daughter Nina in Moscow. He struck up a friendship with Marina Tsvetaeva, another poet on the verge of physical collapse. Unwilling to collaborate with the Bolsheviks (whose "hands were smeared with blood," as he declared openly at one of the literary meetings) occasionally he had to be forced to. In 1920 Anatoly Lunacharsky (urged by Jurgis Baltrušaitis, then the head of the Lithuanian diplomatic mission in Moscow) granted Balmont permission to leave the country. Boris Zaitsev later opined that what Baltrushaitis did was actually to save Balmont's life. According to Sergey Litovtsev (a Russian critic who lived in immigration) at one of the secret meetings of the Cheka the fate of Balmont was discussed, "...it's just that those who were demanding he be put to a firing squad happened to be in the minority at the time." On May 25, 1920, Balmont and his family left Russia for good. As soon as Balmont reached Reval, rumors began to circulate that he had begun to make anti-Soviet public statements, leading to the cancellation of other writers' journeys out of Soviet Russia. Balmont denied these rumors, and there is no evidence to support them, but by 1921 Balmont was regularly publishing inflammatory articles against the Soviet government in the émigré press.

In Paris, Balmont found himself unpopular. Radical Russian émigrés took his safe and easy departure as a sign of his being a Communist sympathizer. Lunacharsky, with his apologetic article ensuring the public at home that Balmont's stance was not in any way anti-Bolshevik, played up to these suspicions. On the other hand, the Bolshevik press accused him of 'treacherousness' for "having been sent to the West on a mission to collect common people's revolutionary poetry and abused the trust of the Soviet government." Condemning repressions in Russia, Balmont was critical of his new environment too, speaking of many things that horrified him in the West. What troubled him most though, was his longing for Russia. "Not a single other Russian poet in exile suffered so painfully from having been severed from his roots," the memoirist Yuri Terapiano later argued. For Balmont his European experience was a "life among aliens." "Emptiness, emptiness everywhere. Not a trace of spirituality here in Europe," he complained in a December 1921 letter to Andreyeva.

In 1921, Balmont moved out of Paris into the provinces where he and his family rented houses in Brittany, the Vendée, Bordeaux, and the Gironde. In the late 1920s, his criticism of both Soviet Russia and what he saw as the leftist Western literary elite's indifference to the plight of the Russian people, became more pronounced. Great Britain's acknowledgement of the legitimacy of (in Balmont's words) "the international gang of bandits who seized power in Moscow and Saint Petersburg" rendered "a fatal blow to the last remnants of honesty in post-War Europe." Still, unlike his conservative friend Ivan Shmelyov, Balmont was a liberal: he detested fascism and right-wing nationalist ideas. All the while, he shied away from Russian Socialists (like Alexander Kerensky and Ilya Fondaminsky) and expressed horror at what he saw as France's general 'enchantment' with socialism. His views were in many ways similar to those of Ivan Bunin; the two disliked each other personally, but spoke in one voice on many occasions.

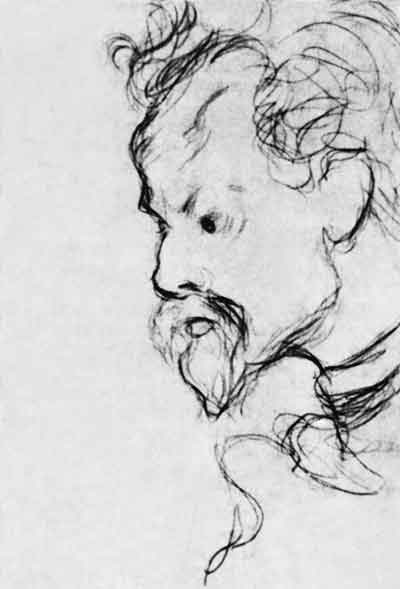
Balmont by Voloshin

In emigration Balmont published several books of poetry, including A Gift to Earth (Дар Земле), Lightened Hour (Светлый час, both 1921), The Haze (Марево, 1922), From Me to Her. Poems of Russia (Моё — ей. Стихи о России, 1923), Beyond Stretched Horizons (В раздвинутой дали, 1929), Northern Lights (Северное сияние, 1933), Blue Horseshoe (Голубая подкова) and Serving the Light (Светослужение, both 1937). He released autobiographies and memoirs: Under the New Sickle (Под новым серпом), The Airy Path (Воздушный путь, both 1923) and Where Is My Home? (Где мой дом?, Prague, 1924). Balmont's poetry in emigration was criticized by Vladimir Nabokov who called his verse "jarring" and "its new melodies false." Nina Berberova argued that Balmont had exhausted his muse while in Russia and that none of his later work was worthy of attention. Modern Russian critics assess Balmont's last books more favorably, seeing them as more accessible and insightful, even if less flamboyant than his best known work. The poet and biographer Nikolai Bannikov called the poems "Pines in Dunes" (Дюнные сосны) and "Russian Language" (Русский язык) "little masterpieces". From the mid-1920s, Balmont turned his gaze to Eastern Europe, traveling to centers of the Russian emigration in Lithuania, Poland, Czechoslovakia and Bulgaria, translating poetry from their languages, and adapting their folklore in his own original work.

In the early 1930s, as the financial support from the Czech and Yugoslav governments stopped, Balmont, who had to support three women, fell into poverty. Ivan Shmelyov provided moral support, and professor Vladimir Zeeler some financial help. In April 1936 a group of Russian writers and musicians abroad celebrated the 50th anniversary of Balmont's literary career by staging a charity event; among the organizers and contributors were Shmelyov, Bunin, Zaitsev, Sergei Rachmaninoff, and Mark Aldanov.

Balmont died on 23 December 1942 in a refuge for Russian émigrés, the Russian House, due to complications from pneumonia. He is interred in Noisy-le-Grand's Catholic cemetery, four words engraved on his grey tomb: "Constantin Balmont, poete russe". Among the several people who came to the funeral were Zaitsev, Balmont's daughter Mirra, and Jurgis Baltrushaitis's widow.

== Personality ==
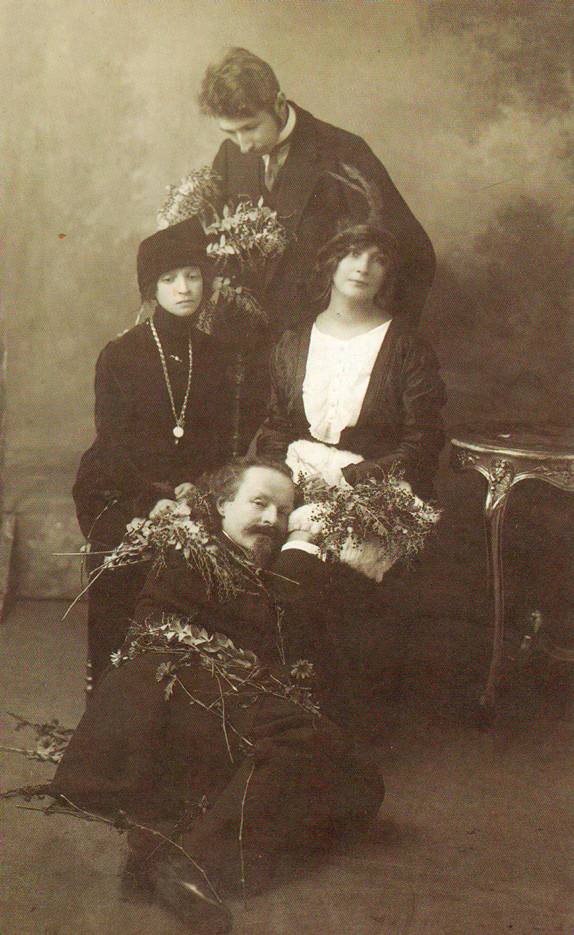
Balmont and Sergey Gorodetsky with their respective wives (Andreyeva to the right), Saint Petersburg, 1907.

Konstantin Balmont has been characterized variously as theatrical, pretentious, erratic and egotistical. Boris Zaitsev, ridiculing good-humouredly his best friend's vain eccentricities, remembered episodes when Balmont "could be an altogether different person: very sad and very simple." Andrei Bely spoke of Balmont as a lonely and vulnerable man, totally out of touch with the real world. Inconsistency marred his creativity too: "He failed to connect and harmonize those riches he was given by nature, aimlessly spending his spiritual treasures," Bely argued.

"Balmont was a poseur and the reasons for this were obvious. Always crowded by worshipers, he tried to behave in a manner he saw as befitting a great poet... It was laughter that gave him away... Just like a child, he was always moved by a momentary impulse," wrote Teffi. "He lives his everyday life as a poet, trying to discover each moment's full richness. That is why one shouldn't judge him by common criteria," Valery Bryusov argued.

Pyotr Pertsov who knew Balmont from teenage years, characterized him as "a very nice, friendly, and considerate young man." Marina Tsvetaeva insisted that he was "the kind of man who'd give a needy one his last piece of bread, his last log of wood." Mark Talov, a Soviet translator who in the 1920s found himself penniless in Paris, remembered how often, after having left Balmont's house, he would find money in a pocket; the poet (who was very poor himself) preferred this anonymous way of helping so as not to confuse a visitor.

Bohemian habits notwithstanding, Balmont was a hard worker, proficient and prolific. Eccentric to many, he seemed rational and logical to some. The publisher Sergey Sabashnikov remembered Balmont as "accurate, punctual, pedantic and never slovenly... Such accuracy made Balmont a very welcome client," he added.

== Origins ==
In his 1903 short autobiography, Balmont wrote:

According to our family legend, my ancestors were sailors, either Scottish or Scandinavian, who came to Russia and settled there. My father's father was a Navy officer and a hero of the Turkish War praised by Tsar Nicholas the First for bravery. My mother's ancestors were Tatars, the first in the line being Prince Bely Lebed (White Swan) of the Golden Horde. That was where two of her distinctive qualities, unruliness and tempestuousness, which I inherited, came from.

According to Yekaterina Andreyeva's Memoirs, Balmont's paternal grand-grandfather Ivan Andreyevich Balamut (Баламут, the Ukrainian surname, translated literally as "trouble-maker") was a landowner in Kherson, Southern Ukraine, who served as a cavalry sergeant in Catherine the Great's Imperial Guard regiment (Andreyeva insisted she had seen the proof of it in an original parchment-written document kept in the family archives).

Dmitry Konstantinovich, Vera Nikolayevna and all of their relatives pronounced the surname Bál'mont. The poet changed its pronunciation to Bal'mónt, citing "a certain woman's whimsy" as his reason.

== Private life ==
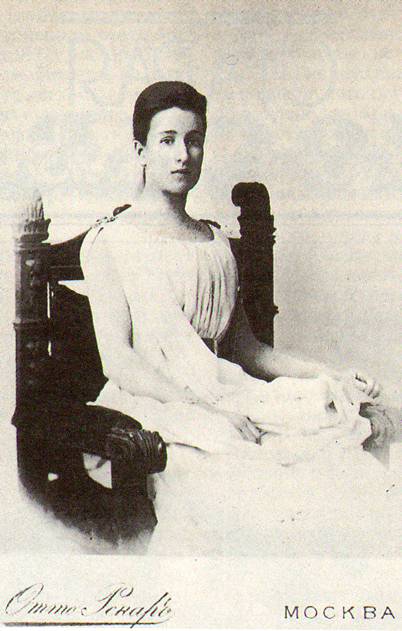
Yekaterina Andreyeva, Balmont's second wife.

In 1889, ignoring his mother's warnings, Balmont married Larisa Mikhaylovna Garelina, a daughter of Shuya-based factory-owner, described as a neurasthenic who "gave [the poet] the love of a truly demonic nature". This led first to Balmont's ties with his family being severed, then his March 13, 1890, suicide attempt. The couple's first son died in infancy; the second, Nikolai, suffered from mental illness. Later some critics warned against demonizing Larisa Garelina, pointing to the fact that years later she married the well-known Russian journalist and literature historian Nikolai Engelgardt and enjoyed a normal family life with him. Their daughter Anna Engelgardt became the second wife of poet Nikolay Gumilyov.

On 27 September 1896, Balmont married Yekaterina Alekseyevna Andreyeva (1867–1952), a well-educated woman who came from a rich merchant's family, related to the well-known Moscow publishers, the Sabashnikovs. Andreyeva and Balmont had much in common; they formed a tandem of translators and worked together on the works of Gerhart Hauptmann and Oscar Wilde. Andreyeva, a strong-minded woman, was a leading force in the family, and in her 'strong, healthy and loving hands' (according to Boris Zaitsev, who knew them well) Balmont led a "disciplined, working man's life." In 1901 their daughter Nina Balmont (Bruni in marriage, died in Moscow in 1989) was born.

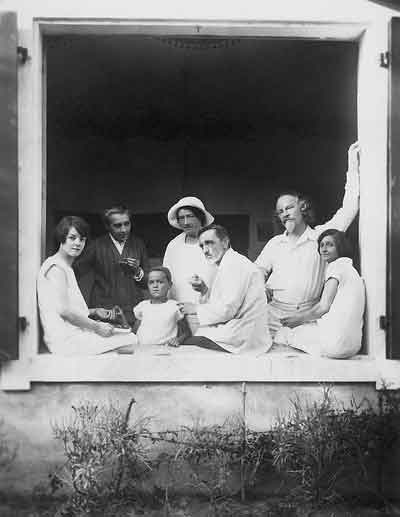
Balmont and Ivan Shmelyov (second and third to the right respectively) with relatives and friends. Leftmost: Mirra Balmont, rightmost: Yelena Tsvetkovskaya.

In the early 1900s, while in Paris, Balmont met Yelena Konstantinovna Tsvetkovskaya (1880–1943), general K. G. Tzvetkovsky's daughter, a student of mathematics at the University of Paris and the poet's ardent fan. Balmont, as some of his letters suggested, wasn't in love with her, but soon found himself in many ways dependent upon the girl who proved to be a loyal, devoted friend. Balmont's family life got seriously complicated in 1907 when Tsvetkovskaya gave birth to a daughter Mirra, named so by her father in the memory of the poet Mirra Lokhvitskaya, who died in 1905 and with whom he had passionate platonic relations. Torn between the two families, in 1909 Balmont attempted suicide for the second time (jumping out a window) and again survived. Up until 1917 he lived in Saint Petersburg with Tsvetkovskaya and Mirra, occasionally visiting Yekaterina and Nina in Moscow. While in France Balmont continued to correspond with Andreyeva up until 1934.

Balmont and Tsvetkovskaya, according to Teffi, communicated in a bizarrely pretentious manner. "She was always calling him 'a poet' and never 'my husband', since they never married (he remained legally married to Yekaterina until his death). A simple phrase such as 'my husband would like a drink' in their special argot would turn into something like: 'A poet is willing to appease his thirst'." Unlike Andreyeva, Yelena Tsvetkovskaya was helpless in domestic life and had no influence over Balmont whatsoever.

From 1919 Balmont was romantically linked with Dagmar Shahovskaya (née von Lilienfeld, 1893–1967), who followed Balmont to France in 1921. They lived apart except for brief periods, although Dagmar bore Balmont two children: Georges (1922–1943) and Svetlana (1925–2018). Balmont sent her letters or postcards almost daily; in all, 858 of them survived, mostly from 1920-1924. It was Elena Tsvetkovskaya, though, who remained with Balmont until his dying day. She died in 1943, surviving him by a year. Balmont's wife, Yekaterina died in 1954. Dagmar Shahovskaya died in 1967.

Mirra Tsvetkovskaya (in her first marriage Boychenko, in the second Ayutina) was a published poet, who used the pseudonym Aglaya Gamayun. She died in Paris in 1970.

== In music ==
Among the Russian composers who have set Balmont's poetry to music are Mikhail Gnessin, Nikolai Myaskovsky, Nikolai Obukhov, Sergei Prokofiev, Sergei Rachmaninoff, Maximilian Steinberg, Igor Stravinsky, and Sergei Taneyev. His free Russian translation of Edgar Allan Poe's "The Bells" formed the basis for Rachmaninoff's choral symphony of the same name, Op. 35. He surely influenced Aleksandr Scriabin for his Poème de l’extase.

== Selected works ==
=== Poetry collections ===
- Collection of Poems (Сборник стихотворений, 1890)
- Under the Northern Sky (Под северным небом, 1894)
- In Boundlessness (В безбрежности, 1895)
- Silence (Тишина. Лирические поэмы, 1898)
- Burning Buildings. The Lyric of the Modern Soul (Горящие здания. Лирика современной души, 1900)
- Let Us Be Like the Sun. The Book of Symbols (Будем как солнце. Книга символов, 1903)
- Only Love (Только любовь. Семицветник, 1903)
- Liturgy of Beauty (Литургия красоты. Стихийные гимны, 1905)
- Fairy's Fairytales (Фейные сказки (детские песенки), 1905)
- Vile Charms (Злые чары, 1906)
- Poems (Стихотворения, 1906)
- Firebird. Slavic Svirel (Жар-птица. Свирель славянина, 1907)
- Songs of the Avenger (Песни мстителя, 1907)
- Three Blossoms. Theatre of Youth and Beauty (Три расцвета. Театр юности и красоты, 1907)
- Runaround of Times (Хоровод времён. Всегласность, 1909)
- Birds in the Air (Птицы в воздухе. Строки напевные, 1908)
- Green Vertograd (Зелёный вертоград. Слова поцелуйные, 1909)
- White Architect. Mystery of Four Lanterns (Белый Зодчий. Таинство четырёх светильников, 1914)
- Ash. Visions of a Tree (Ясень. Видение древа, 1916)
- Sonnets of Sun, Honey and Moon (Сонеты Солнца, Мёда и Луны, 1917; published in 1921 in Berlin)
