= Segodnya (1919) =

Russian-language newspaper published in Riga, Latvia (1919–1940)

Segodnya Сегодня
- Type: Daily newspaper
- Owner(s): Jakovs Bramss and Boriss Poļaks
- Founder(s): Jakovs Bramss and Boriss Poļaks
- Founded: 17 August 1919
- Ceased publication: 21 June 1940
- Political alignment: Liberal democratic
- Language: Russian
- Headquarters: Dzirnavu iela 55/57, Riga, Latvia
- Free online archives: periodika.lv

Segodnya (Russian: Сегодня, lit. 'Today', Latvian: Segodņa) was a Russian-language newspaper published in Riga, Latvia from 1919 to 1940. It was founded and owned by Yakov Brams (Jakovs Brams) and Boris Polyak (Boriss Poļaks).

Its editorial line was liberal and democratic. It had a comparatively well-developed network of foreign correspondents and extensive analysis of European affairs, making it accessible amongst Russian émigrés and was the most significant Russian newspaper with circulation outside the USSR in the 1930s. The newspaper was the most popular daily periodical among the Russian speaking population of Latvia at the time. From 1924 an evening edition, Segodnya Vecherom, was published.

Material was sent to the newspaper from famous Russian writers and poets – Arkady Averchenko, Konstantin Balmont, Ivan Bunin, Alexander Kuprin, Nadezhda Teffi and Ivan Shmelev. In the words of a researcher of the Russian press, Yury Abyzov: 'the newspaper was not émigré, or anti-Bolshevist, or European. It was considered itself Latvian, inasmuch as it catered for the multi-ethnic society of the republic, which had grown in an atmosphere of Russian culture'.

The newspaper was shut down by the Soviet authorities following the occupation and annexation of Latvia by the USSR in 1940 with the last issue being released on 21 June 1940. The editorial board tried to preserve the paper by renaming it to Russkaya Gazeta (Russian: Русская газета, lit. 'The Russian Gazette'), but it was closed by the Soviets after its 5th issue on July 2. After the removal of the chief editors and arrests of most of the contributors, the remnants of the paper became the Trudovaya Gazeta (Russian: Трудовая газета, lit. 'The Labor Gazette') from July 4. Ultimately, it also was banned on November 9 and merged into the newly established newspaper Proletarskaya Pravda (Russian: Пролетарская правда, lit. 'The Proletarian Truth').

Due to the paper's editorial line critical of Soviet communism, many people connected with Segodnya were singled out for persecution by the NKVD. Both owners of the paper managed to flee to the United States.

A number of its staff and contributors came from Latvia's Jewish community and were also murdered in the Holocaust during Latvia's occupation by Nazi Germany in 1941–1944, while some perished in the Soviet Gulag (e.g. Grigory Landau).

== Literature ==
- Abyzov, Iuriy (ed.), Gazeta "Segodnia", 1919–1940: rospis'. Riga: Latviiskaia natsional'naia biblioteka, 2001. 2 v. ISBN 9984-607-34-8 (ch. 1) ISBN 978-9984-607-34-4 (ch. 1) ISBN 9984-607-36-4 (ch. 2) ISBN 978-9984-607-36-8 (ch. 2) (in Russian) OCLC 50159356
- Равдин Б., Флейшман Л., Абызов Ю. "Русская печать в Риге: из истории газеты "Сегодня" 1930-х годов", Stanford 1997.
