= Let Us Be Like the Sun =

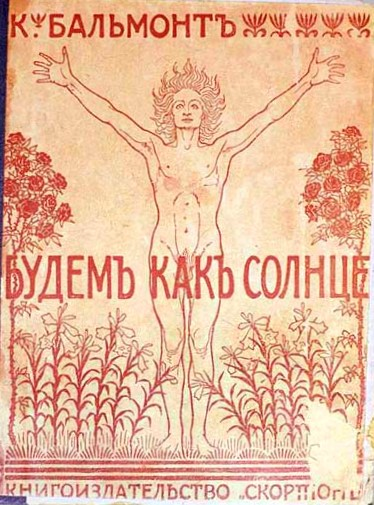
- First edition cover
- Author: Konstantin Balmont
- Original title: Будем как Солнце
- Publication date: 1903
- Publication place: Russia
- Media type: Print

Let Us Be Like the Sun is the sixth book of poetry by Konstantin Balmont, first published in 1903 by Scorpion in Moscow.

For an epigraph, Balmont has chosen the words of Anaxagoras: "I entered this world to see the Sun." The book came out with a dedication to Valery Bryusov, Sergey Poliakov, Yurgis Baltrushaitis and Lucy Savitskaya.

== Background ==
Most of its poems were written in 1901–1902 when Balmont stayed at the Sabynino estate in the Kursk Governorate. In March 1902 Balmont made the public recitals for members of G. G. Bakhman's literary circle. The censorship committee instantly got interested, examined the book and demanded that numerous changes should be made. On July 1, 1903, Balmont wrote in a letter to Yeronym Yasinsky, then the editor of Ezhemesyachnye sochinenya (Monthly Books) magazine: "Have you received the book Let Us Be Like the Sun which while running through the censorship gauntlet has lost ten poems in the process? They wanted to throw out "The Devil's Artist" too, but it was saved by the fact that it had been published already in Ezhemesyachnye sochinenya."

The book was completed in late 1902 and published in 1903. Its second edition came as part of the Collection of Poems (1904, Scorpion, Moscow), the third of the Complete Poems by Balmont (1908, Scorpion, vol.2), the fourth of the Complete Balmont (Scorpion, 1912, vol.3), the fifth of The Collection of Lyric (Moscow, 1918, vol. 5)

== Problems with censorship ==
In November 1902 the book was presented to the Moscow censorship committee. The author had to edit it, especially its erotic section called "Enchanted Grotto" (a metaphor for vagina), but that, apparently, was not enough. On March 3, 1903, the censor Sokolov submitted a report to the Saint Petersburg Publishing Department, stating: "Konstantin Balmont's book consists of 205 poems [...] From the censorship's point of view all of them are worthy of attention, since they belong to the so-called symbolism, too many of them being erotic, cynical and even sacrilegious. As a censor I found the book in question exceptionally detrimental and would recommend it to be reported immediately to the General Publishing Dpt., adding the notion that it might be especially harmful for modern times when the majority of readership, young people in particular, are so fond of symbolism."

Another censor, M.Nikolsky examined Let Us Be Like the Sun and demanded that some more cuts should be made in the text of the book, some copies of which have already been printed. M.N.Semyonov, Polyakov's relative and associate at the Scorpion, wrote the latter on May 17: "Brother Sergey, things with Let Us Be Like the Sun as they stand now, are appalling. I've seen Zverev today and he told me: 'When we met for the first time I told you some pornographic poems would have to go, but now, another Committee member has read it, and he found many poems there to be sacrilegious, which makes the matter more serious."

Twenty years later Balmont decided to restore the poems banned by censors. He planned to involve the avant-garde artist and painter Natalia Goncharova as well as illustrator Lucy Savitskaya in the project but failed apparently find a French publisher.

Many poems, excluded from "The Enchanted Grotto", have been later mistakenly attributed to Maximilian Voloshin (who's copied them for some reason to his notebooks). The Soviet scholar V.N.Orlov published the collection in its original form, as an academic edition.

== Critical analysis ==
The critic and biographer M.Stakhova saw the book as an attempt to artistically recreate the cosmogonist picture of the Universe with the Sun at its center; a pantheist Bible of worshipping elements, the Moon and the stars. Among its recurrent theme is that 'stopping the time' and reaching the 'magic in moment' ("The thought has no means to fathom depths/ No means to slow down the running Spring/ It can, though, say Stop! to time/ Break down its own chains and now be chained by Dream").

Fire, the earthly 'face' of the Sun, holds special place in Balmont's scheme of things. "Russian literature has never known such fire-worshipper, as Balmont was," biographer Nikolai Bannikov wrote.
