= Alexander Yablonovsky =

- Born: Alexander Snadzsky; November 15, 1870; Moscow, Russian Empire
- Died: July 4, 1934 (aged 63); Paris, France
- Occupations: journalist, publicist

Alexander Alexandrovich Yablonovsky (Russian: Александр Александрович Яблоновский, born Снадский, Snadsky, 15 November 1870, Kitrosanovka village, Kherson Governorate, Imperial Russia, - 3 July 1934, Paris, France) was a Russian writer, journalist and publicist. He was a prominent figure of the Russian literary emigration in Paris.

== Career ==
A Saint Petersburg University alumnus, Yablonovsky debuted as a published author in 1893, in Russkoye Bogatstvo, with the short story Posledyshi (Youngest Children) and went on to contribute to Mir Bozhy, Syn Otechestva, Rech, Nasha Zhyzn, as well as Obrazovaniye magazine where he edited the satirical Common Images (Родные картинки) section. In 1905-1916, he worked for Kiyevskaya Mysl where his political feuilletons appeared regularly, before moving to Russkoye Slovo in 1916. In 1912-1913, the complete collection of Yablonovsky's sketches and feuilletons came out as a separate edition, in three volumes. Widely discussed was his autobiographical novel Iz gimnazicheskoy zhizni (Из гимназической жизни, A Life in Gymnasium) originally published by Mir Bozhy in 1901.

During the Russian Civil War, Yablonovsky worked for different newspapers in the Russian South, including Rostov-on-Don-based Parus (Sail). In 1920, with the Volunteer Army units, he left Novorossiysk for Egypt, then moved to Berlin before settling in 1925 in Paris.

He contributed to numerous European Russian-language periodicals, including Segodnya (Riga), Rul (Berlin), Posledniye Izvestia (Tallinn), but mostly to Paris-based Vozrozhdenye newspaper and was one of the prominent members of its staff in 1925-1934. Specializing in political satire, Yablonovsky created the gallery of the Bolshevik leaders, including Lenin, Trotsky and Dzerzhinsky, exposed the Soviet diplomats' shady financial operations abroad ("Litvinov's Brother", Vozrozhdenye, 1928), protested against the extermination of the Russian clergy and (in "The Kindred Times", Родственные эпохи, Segodnya, 1928) argued that the sheer scope of atrocities committed by the Bolshevik regime made it a true heir to the bloodiest legacy of Ivan the Terrible.

He lampooned the Russian writers choosing to serve the new regime (Andrey Bely, Vladimir Mayakovsky, A.N. Tolstoy, Sergey Esenin, Vikenty Veresayev, but mostly the unforgiving Maxim Gorky) as well as some of their French colleagues (Anatole France, Henri Barbusse) infatuated with the Soviet Russia. With his lecture The Achievements of the Revolution he performed in Berlin, Riga and Tallinn. Some of Yablonovsky's earlier work was re-issued abroad to critical acclaim (Stories, 1922, Berlin, in two volumes; Stories for Children, Paris, 1922), but the response to his 1928 novel Deti ulitsy (Дети улицы, Children of the Street) was indifferent.

One of the leaders of the Union of Russian Writers and Journalists in Paris, Yablonovsky enjoyed sudden fame in September 1928 at the First Congress of Russian Writers Abroad in Belgrade, where his speech made a strong impression upon the audience which led him to being elected the Chairman of the Congress' Committee. Alexander I of Yugoslavia later awarded him the Order of St. Sava of the 3rd Grade.
