= In Boundlessness =

1895 book of poetry by Konstantin Balmont

- Author: Konstantin Balmont
- Original title: В безбрежности
- Language: Russian
- Genre: Russian Symbolism
- Publication date: 1895
- Publication place: Russian Empire
- Media type: Print (hardback & paperback)
- Preceded by: Under the Northern Sky
- Followed by: Silence

In Boundlessness (Russian: В безбрежности, romanized: V bezbrezhnosti) is a second major poetry collection by Konstantin Balmont, first published in 1895 in Moscow. Following Under the Northern Sky, it features 95 poems, some of which bear first signs of the author's experiments with the Russian language's musical and rhythmical structures he would later become famous for.

The book came with an epigraph from Fyodor Dostoyevsky's The Brothers Karamazov: "Kiss the earth and love tirelessly and insatiably; love everyone and everything, keep seeking delight and ecstasy." Balmont read Crime and Punishment at sixteen, and The Brothers Karamazov a year later. "It gave me more than any other book I've ever read," he later wrote of this novel.

The initial reviews by mainstream critics were lukewarm, but the Symbolist faction of the Russian artistic community embraced the book as an innovative work. In retrospect it is regarded as an important artistic statement that in many ways shaped the face of Russian literary modernism.

== Notable poems ==
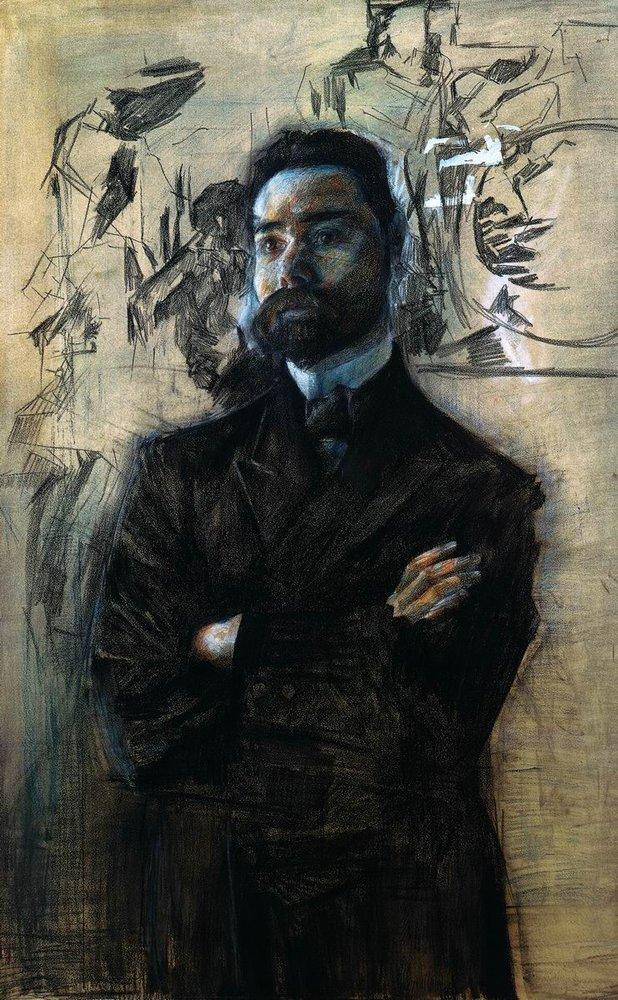
Valery Bryusov by Mikhail Vrubel, 1906

- "Okean" (Океан, Ocean). A poem dedicated to Valery Bryusov with whom Balmont (according to the former) was 'bound by a thread of both friendship and animosity'. The two, according to Marina Tsvetayeva, "walked as pair... In those years once you've mentioned one, you couldn't help meaning the other one too. Balmont-Bryusov. Joint rulers." Tsvetayeva considered them the Russian Symbolism's 'Mozart-and-Salieri', each signifying an extreme end of artistry. "Balmont: utter and complete openness. Bryusov: toughness... Childish creator (Balmont) and labourer creator (Bryusov)... Joy of giving, Balmont. Joy of possessing, Bryusov."

Maximilian Voloshin described the same antinomy as: "the poet-magician" (Balmont) and "the poet-conqueror, the poet empire-builder, bound to set laws and thrones" (Bryusov)."
Bryusov, the driving force behind the whole Russian Symbolist movement, has been hugely influenced by Balmont and was for a while admittedly under his spell. "It was through Balmont that the mystery of the poetry's musicality has been revealed to me," he wrote later.

Yet it was Bryusov who first noticed the early signs of crisis in Balmont's mid-1900s poetry and was quite open about it. In 1905 he wrote: "For a decade Balmont reigned supreme in our poetry. But now he dropped the scepter. We moved further afield. He stays where he was." Balmont was sure it was just 'jealousy' on behalf of Bryusov. "Tell Valery I do not send him my respects," he told his friends as he was departing from Russia in 1907.

- "Ya mechtoyu lovil ukhodyashchiye teni..." (Я мечтою ловил уходящие тени..., I was dream-catching vanishing shadows...). A declaration of the poet's quest for artistic truth, through climbing up a symbolic stairway in pursuit of the unfathomable. "The symbolic method here is taken to the extreme of perfection," opined the critic Ellis, who defined this method as "treating the real world as means to the end," the spectrum of reflections," and "the temple of symbols propped by columns of life" which a poet enters in order to "seek eternity in fleeting things, and boundlessness in all things relative and limited."
- "Voskres'shiy" (Воскресший, The Resurrected One). Re-evaluation of the early suicide attempt in the symbolist's terms. The poet feels the need to die (in reality, in history, et cetera) so as to recognize in him "the light of eternity."
