= Anthem of Free Russia =

1917 proposed anthem of the Russian Republic

Гимн Свободной России
English: "Anthem of Free Russia"
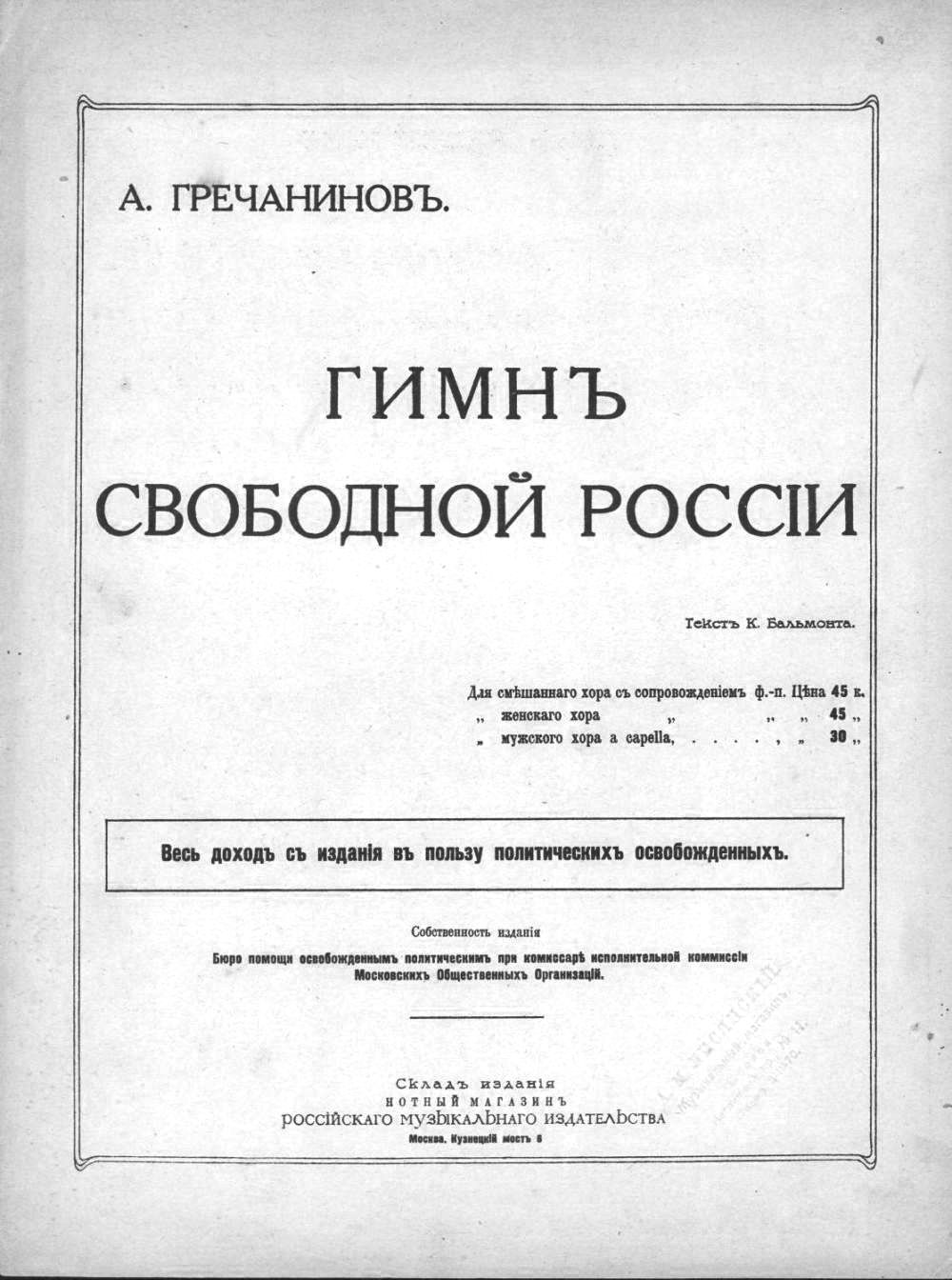
- Sheet music by the Russian Music Publishing
- Proposed national anthem of Russia
- Also known as: «Да здравствует Россия, свободная страна!» (English: "Long Live Russia, A Free Country!")
- Lyrics: Konstantin Balmont, 1917
- Music: Alexander Gretchaninov, 1917

Audio sample
- 1917 vocal recording by Fyodor Oreshkevich in Kyiv: file; help

The Anthem of Free Russia, (Note: Russian: Гимн Свободной России, romanized: Gimn Svobodnoy Rossii, IPA: [ɡʲimn svɐˈbodnəj rɐˈsʲi(j)ɪ]) sometimes known by its incipit "Long Live Russia", (Note: Russian: Да здравствует Россия, romanized: Da zdravstvuyet Rossiya, IPA: [dɐ‿ˈzdrastvʊ(j)ɪt rɐˈsʲijə]) was a proposed anthem of the Russian Republic after the February Revolution. The music was composed by Russian composer Alexander Gretchaninov and the lyrics were written by Constantine Balmont. However, unlike the "Worker's Marseillaise", the Hymn of Free Russia was not adopted by the Russian Provisional Government of 1917, nor was it approved during several special meetings of artists.

== Development ==
When Gretchaninov found out the music of the song was finalized along with unfinished lyrics, he became dissatisfied with the lyrics, so he contacted Balmont. After Gretchaninov contacted Balmont, the lyrics were complete. The anthem was eventually published and was first performed at Bolshoi Theatre, directed by Emil Cooper. Originally, the plot was taken from My Life («Моя жизнь»), a book written by Gretchaninov. It was published in New York City in 1954.

After Gretchaninov's arrival in the United States, his friend Kurt Schindler and his wife translated the text into English, which was published by G. Schirmer, Inc.

== Historical significance ==
The song was widely popular between February and the Bolshevik Revolution in November. According to the historians Boris Kolonitskii and Orlando Figes, songs were an important form of revolutionary expression:

"Singing was the signal for a demonstration. It gave the protesters a sense of purpose and confidence and, perhaps most importantly, lifted their spirits. The leaders of the singing were the focus of the crowd in the February Days. The sound of the crowd drew other people on to the streets and hence into 'the revolution'. By joining in with the singing, spectators turned into participants in a matter of moments. Songs united the demonstrators, giving cohesion and a collective identity to diverse groups and classes."

== Popularity ==
Shortly after the release of Radio Liberty on air, a musical screen saver was needed, through which listeners could listen to Russian broadcasts better. The Hymn of Free Russia was then chosen.

As radio veteran Gene Sosin recalled in the book Sparks of Freedom, the anthem began with the line "Long live Russia, a free country!" and the music was performed on a celestial, although the tempo and instrumentation was later changed to an orchestra. For 38 consecutive years, millions of listeners in the Soviet Union actively heard the tune, regardless of the song's origin. The song was well-known to be "connected with a 'free voice' from the outside world." This made people forget about their cold pasts.

The song became the unofficial anthem of the Russian opposition. During the Russian invasion of Ukraine, it also became a popular anti-war symbol.

== Lyrics ==
Anthem of Free Russia Instrumental
Instrumental rendition

Russian original

Припев:
Да здравствует Россия,
свободная страна!
Свободная стихия
великой суждена!

I
Могучая держава,
безбрежный океан!
Борцам за волю слава,
развеявшим туман!

Припев

II
Леса, поля, и нивы,
и степи, и моря,
Мы вольны и счастливы,
нам всем горит заря!

Припев

Latin transliteration

Pripev:
Da zdravstvuyet Rossiya,
svobodnaya strana!
Svobodnaya stikhiya
vyelikoy suzhdyena!

I
Moguchaya dyerzhava,
byezbryezhnyy okyean!
Bortsam za volyu slava,
razvyeyavshym tuman!

Pripev

II
Lesa, polya, i nivy,
i stepi, i morya,
My volny i schastlivy,
nam vsem gorit zarya!

Pripev

English version
(by Kurt Schindler)

Chorus:
Young Russia, hail, victorious!
All praise we chant to thee!
Amid the nations, glorious,
thou standest, proud and free!

I
No tyrant shall enslave thee,
thy sun arises bright;
All hail to those who gave thee
New Freedom's sacred light!

Chorus

II
A song of countless voices
resounds from shore to shore,
The Russian folk rejoices
with Freedom evermore.

Chorus

=== 1926 version ===
1926 recording
Alternative lyrics version performed by David Medoff, 1926

Russian original

Припев:
Да здравствует Россия,
свободная страна!
Свободная стихия
великой суждена!

I
Могучая держава,
безбрежный океан!
Борцам за волю слава,
развеявшим туман!

Припев

II
Добились теперь мы
лучшей доли,
Свергнули мы
царский гнёт!

Припев

III
Всем дали довольно
земли и воли,
Смелей, брат,
вступай вперёд!

Припев

Latin transliteration

Pripev:
Da zdravstvuyet Rossiya,
svobodnaya strana!
Svobodnaya stikhiya
vyelikoy suzhdyena!

I
Moguchaya dyerzhava,
byezbryezhnyy okyean!
Bortsam za volyu slava,
razvyeyavshym tuman!

Pripev

II
Dobilis' tyeper'
my luchshey doli,
Svyergnuli my
tsarskiy gnyot!

Pripev

III
Vsyem dali dovol'no
zyemli i voli,
Smeley, brat,
vstupay vpyeryod!

Pripev

English translation

Chorus:
Long live Russia,
a free country!
A free nature's the destiny
of the great country!

I
A mighty power,
a boundless ocean!
Glory to freedom fighters,
dispelling the fog!

Chorus

II
We have now earned
a better fate for us,
We have demolished
the despotism of the Tsar!

Chorus

III
Everyone has been given
enough land and will,
Be bold, brother,
step on forward!

Chorus

== See also ==
- "Auld Lang Syne", sung in a similar tune
- "Aegukga", sung in a similar tune
