= Anna Yevreinova =

Russian feminist writer, lawyer and literary editor

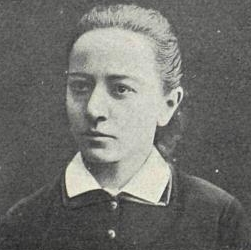
Anna Yevreinova

Anna Mikhaylovna Yevreinova, also referred to as Johanna von Evreinov (Russian: А́нна Миха́йловна Евре́инова; 1844–1919), was a Russian feminist writer, lawyer and literary editor. Following her study at the University of Leipzig, she was the first Russian woman to earn the Doctor of Law degree, she was also the first woman who obtained the Doctor of Law degree from a German university.

== Biography ==
Anna Yevreinova was a daughter of the manager of the Peterhof Palace, lieutenant general Mikhail Yevreinov. The family tried to arrange Anna's marriage against her will forcing her to attempted suicide. At that time Anna received a letter from Russian mathematician Sofia Kovalevskaya, who proposed help in enrolling to a German university. Since the family objected to her move, Anna could not receive a Russian passport and crossed the border illegally, traversing swamps in prunella shoes.

She received her doctoral degree in jurisprudence (Dr. jur.) on 21 February 1873. The title of her dissertation was "The Duties of Neutral Parties towards Parties of War".

She was a frequent correspondent with writers including Anton Chekhov. In 1885 she founded the literary magazine Severny Vestnik. She was the chief editor and the owner of this magazine for the first five years of its existence.

She had a long-term relationship with the author Maria Feodorova.

== See also ==
- First women lawyers around the world
