= Vasily Nemirovich-Danchenko =

Russian writer, essayist, journalist and memoirist

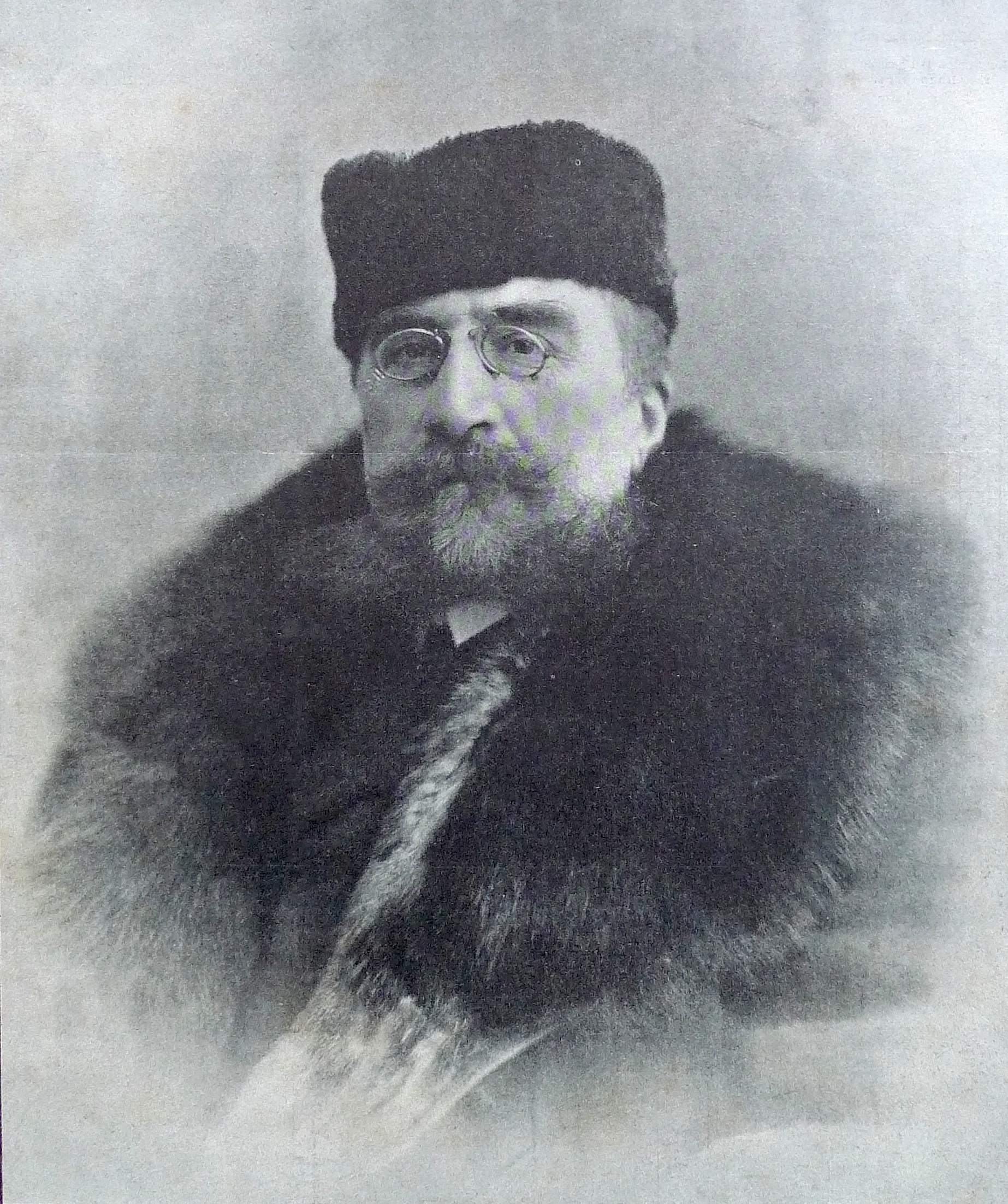
- Vasily Nemirovich-Danchenko in 1912
- Born: 4 January 1845; Tiflis, Russian Empire
- Died: 18 September 1936 (aged 91); Prague, Czechoslovakia

Vasily Ivanovich Nemirovich-Danchenko (Russian: Васи́лий Ива́нович Немиро́вич-Да́нченко, 23 December (4 January) 1845 – 18 September 1936, Prague, Czechoslovakia) was a Russian writer, essayist, journalist and memoirist. He was the brother of the theatre director Vladimir Nemirovich-Danchenko. Vasily Nemirovich-Danchenko, the most prolific Russian Empire writer of the late 19th-early 20th century, published more than 250 books; he was widely popular among the general reading public, but had little success with mainstream critics.

== Biography ==
=== Early life ===
Vasily Nemirovich-Danchenko was born in Tiflis, Russian Empire (now Tbilisi, Georgia), the son of a Russian army officer based in the Caucasus. His memories of early childhood formed the basis of many of his later books, notably those dealing with the Caucasian Wars (The Forgotten Fortress novel, 1895, Gavryushka's Captivity, 1917). He began writing poetry while a student of the Moscow 1st Cadets Corps (1854–1863). In the 1860s he became a member of the Saint Petersburg literary circle based around Sophia Mei (poet Lev Mei's wife). It was in the Modny Magazin (Fashionable Magazine) which she edited that Nemirovich-Danchenko published his first poems in 1865.

In early 1870 Nemirovich-Danchenko was deported to Arkhangelsk (some biographers suggested it was due to embezzlement, but the exact reason remained unclear). From there he wrote a letter to Aleksey Nekrasov, complaining about the injustices he had suffered. The latter took interest in the young poet and published five of his verses in his Otechestvennye Zapiski (No. 11, 1871, signed D.) magazine, under the title Songs of the Fallen. The magazine's reputation was such that several "thick" journals took interest in Nemirovich-Danchenko and his documentary prose. His books of essays (Beyond the Polar Circle, 1876; From the Ocean: Essays, 1874; Solovki: Remembering a tour with Worshippers, 1874), full of original ethnographic material written in an engaging, lively manner, became highly popular and were later re-issued as compilations. "Who's the author of those articles on Solovetsky Monastery in Vestnik Evropy? They are excellent," enquired Ivan Turgenev to Mikhail Stasyulevich, the magazine's editor-in-chief.

=== Career ===
Nemirovich-Danchenko published the majority of his novels, short stories and books for children in the 1870s. A newer series of documentaries (The Bound-up Wanderers, 1877) followed, but this time the critical reception was more cool. Nikolay Mikhaylovsky, while giving the author credit for "having some talent" and "fluency of style" criticised him for being too flashy and "ostentatious in attention-grabbing." It was this aspect of Nemirovich-Danchenko's prose that made it very popular with readers and unpopular with reviewers. Having gained the reputation of a 'tourist writer' and 'ethnographical correspondent', he spent years touring Russia and abroad. The ethnographic material gathered was used extensively in his later fiction (novels Smugglers, 1892 and The Great Old Man, 1898, among others).

As the Russo-Turkish War (1877–1878) broke out, for the first time in Russian history newspaper correspondents were admitted to the fighting Army. Nemirovich-Danchenko travelled to the Balkans as the correspondent for Novoye Vremya (The New Times). His reports were published under the Shest (Six) moniker and later made part one of the One Year of War compilation. He took part in all of the key military operations and was rewarded with the St. George's Cross, usually reserved for heroic soldiers. His cycle of war novels: The Storm (Гроза, 1879), Plevna and Shipka (Плевна и Шипка, 1881), Forward! (Вперед!, 1883), as well as numerous novelettes and short stories were based on his experiences as a correspondent.

The common characteristic of Nemirovich-Danchenko's novels was their "overpopulation"; they boasted a huge number of characters, most of them vague and undeveloped. What he was exceptionally good at, though, was depicting the 'sister of mercy' type of women finding their calling in life in evangelical self-sacrifice. Some critics argued that most of Nemirovich-Danchenko's books of the time were hardly novels in the common sense of the word: huge in size (averaging 700 pages each), they were, in effect, just long sequences of scenes, connected not by a plot line, but by the main characters appearing here and there.

The book of war memoirs called Skobelev: How I Remembered Him (Скобелев. Личные воспоминания и впечатления, 1882) featuring Mikhail Skobelev, the legendary Russian Army general and Turkish War hero as its main character, and containing a wealth of priceless documentary and first-hand historic material written in a captivating manner, became widely popular – among the critics too, for a change. It was general Skobelev who served as a prototype for another well-known Nemirovich-Danchenko novel, The Family of Great Warriors (Семья богатырей).

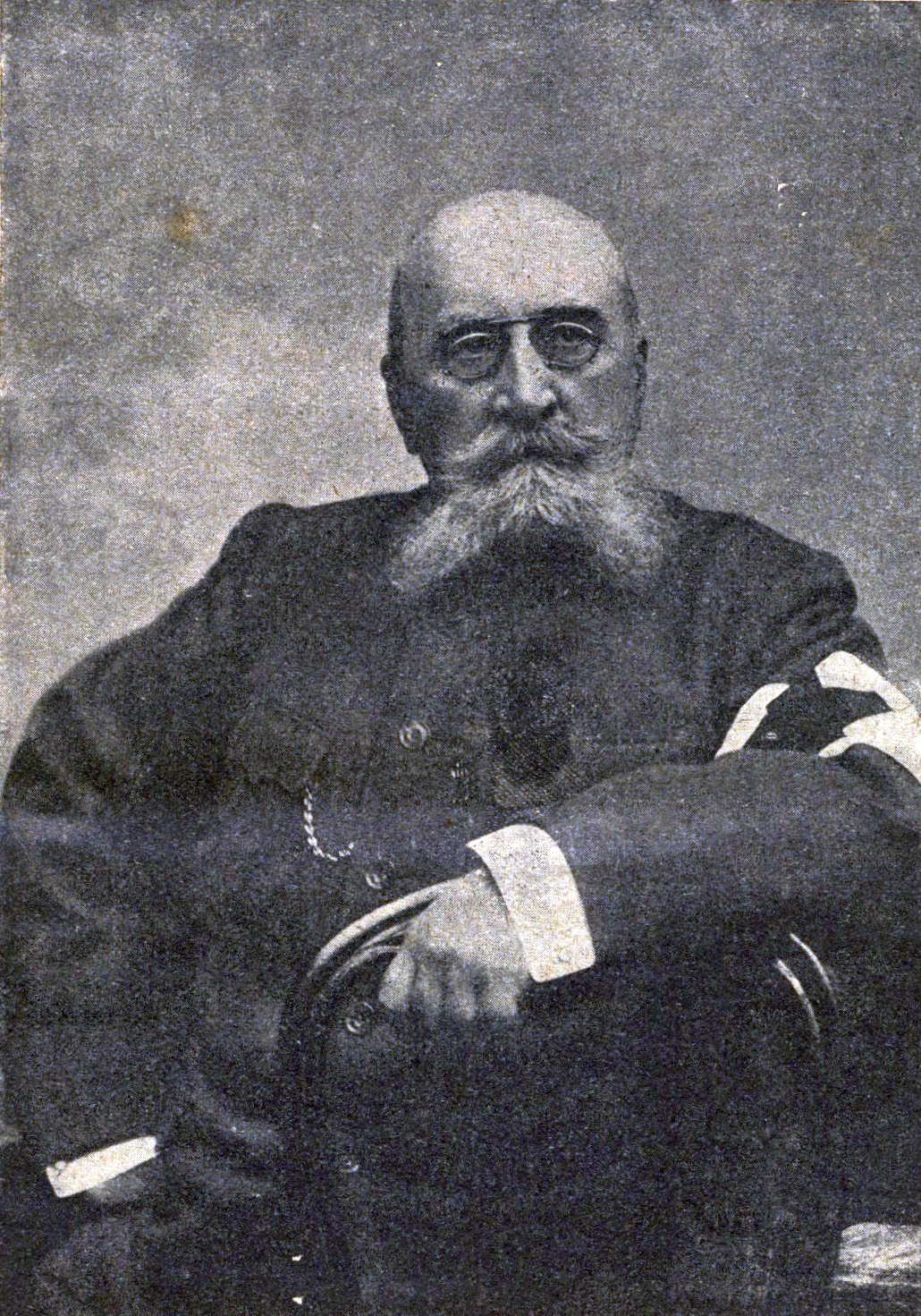
Nemirovich-Danchenko in 1915

In 1882 Nemirovich-Danchenko published his first book of poems. In the 1880s and 1890s several of his novels and short stories came out (in Russkaya Mysl, Sever, Nablyudatel and many other magazines) in which the "world of financial capital" served as the major theme. These books dealt with bank crises, financial machinations, stock exchange speculations, money laundering, the shadowy side of the massive railway boom investments, and the murky world of concessions and joint-stock companies (The Lights on Moors, 1903; Slastyonov’s Millions, 1893; Diamonds Trump!, 1894, The Tsars of Stock Exchange, 1886). Highly dynamic and full of action, these novels were steeped with murder and suicide, had exuberant and preposterous finales, and were jeered by serious critics as totally farcical. This flaw was evident even more in Nemirovich-Danchenko's romantic fiction (Two Diaries, 1901, A Woman's Confession, 1889, On Different Roads, 1894), using the adultery theme as a common leitmotif. Some of Nemirovich-Danchenko's novels, concerning "the small man's troubles" (Wolves' Feast) found favor with the leftist press; Russkaya Mysl supported the author "full of deep love for human beings" and carrying "the faith in God's eternal light filling human souls."

One of the most successful of Nemirovich-Danchenko's books was Major Bobkov and His Orphans, a novel about a man of the highest moral standards who devotes his life to the bringing up of orphan children, refusing himself everything for their happiness. Again, it even touched the soul strings of those critics who otherwise treated the author sceptically. Russkoye Bogatstvo wrote of "the novelette's original and beautiful story line," while Akim Volynsky, a critic known for his stern judgements, wrote sympathetically of this paen to "the self-effacing, self-sacrificing man labouring selfishly for the happiness of other people."

As the Russo-Japanese War broke out in early 1904, Nemirovich-Danchenko travelled to Manchuria as a Novoye Slovo war correspondent. He arrived at Port Arthur together with a shipment of ammunition just before the start of the Siege of Port Arthur. Staying in the fortress, in the first year of his mission there he published 350 reports which had "an astounding success". Nemirovich-Danchenko served again as a correspondent in World War I. His popularity with readers never waned; not long before his emigration in 1921 a Vestnik Literatury reviewer described him as "one of our best stylists" and a "master of poetry in prose" whose "books are invariably among the most in demand in libraries ".

Nemirovich-Danchenko was one of the most prolific writers in the history of Russian literature, having published more than 250 books in his lifetime. Dmitry Grigorovich wrote of him: "...What a wonderful novelist Vasily Ivanovich would have made, had he, instead of writing forty volumes, written, say, six. He is a man of such extraordinary talent".

In 1921 Vasily Nemirovich-Danchenko emigrated to Germany, then moved to Czechoslovakia where he died in Prague, in 1936.

== English translations ==
- Personal Reminiscences of General Skobeleff, Allen, London, 1884. from Archive.org
- With a Diploma, and The whirlwind, Maunsel, London, 1915. from Archive.org
- Peasant Tales of Russia, McBride, NY, 1918. from Archive.org
