= Severny Vestnik =

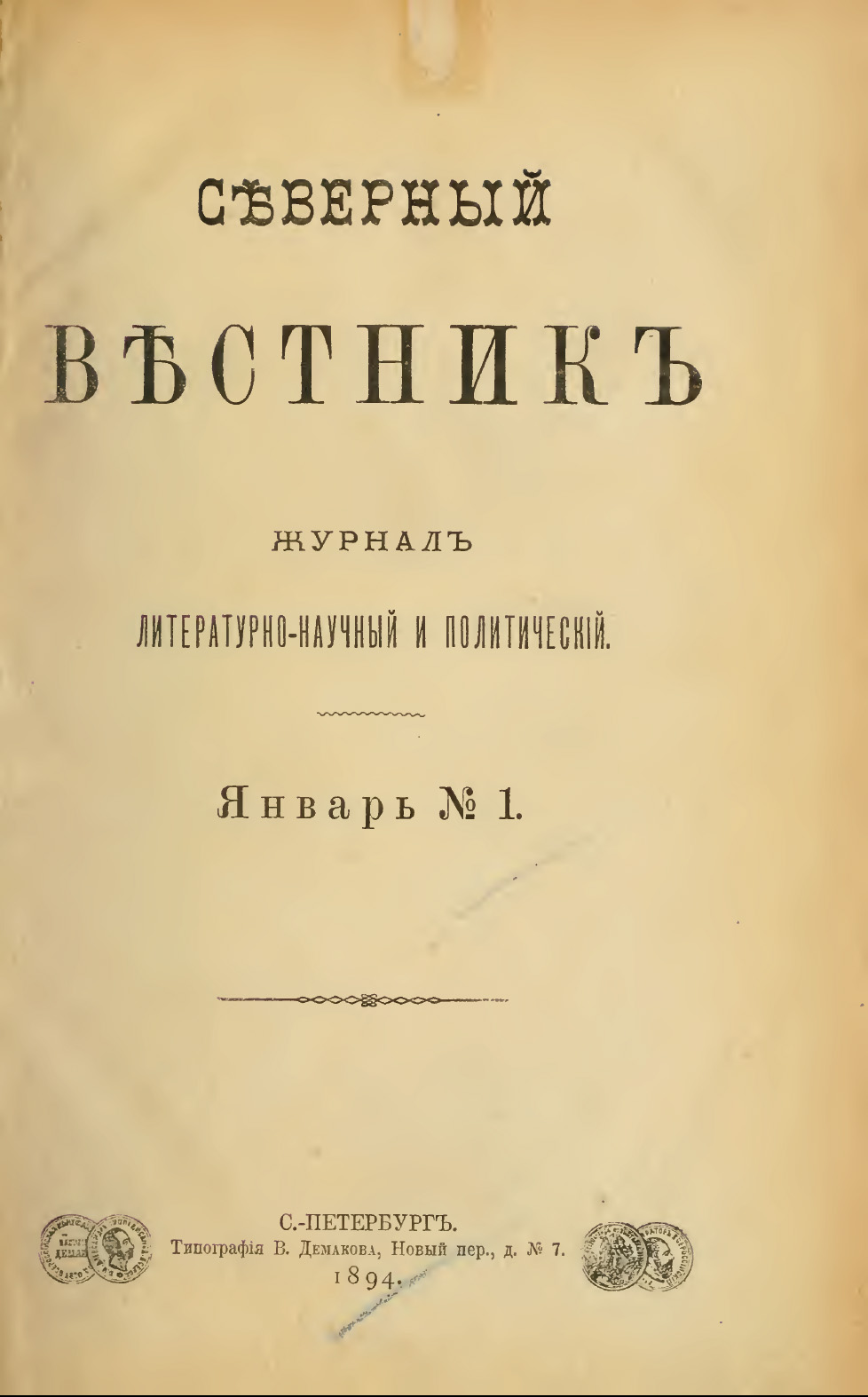
- 1894 cover of Severny Vestnik
- Editor: Anna Yevreinova; Mikhail Albov
- Frequency: Monthly
- Founded: 1885
- Final issue: 1898
- Based in: Saint Petersburg
- Language: Russian

Severny Vestnik (Russian: Се́верный ве́стник, English: The Northern Messenger) was an influential Russian literary magazine founded in Saint Petersburg in 1885 by Anna Yevreinova, who stayed with it until 1889.

== History ==
In the early years Severny Vestnik was the Narodnik's stable; after Otechestvennye Zapiski folded in 1884 it was here that Nikolay Mikhaylovsky and his allies took refuge, among them being Gleb Uspensky, Vladimir Korolenko and Anton Chekhov.

Later, in the 1890s, after Liubov Gurevich's group had acquired it, Severny Vestnik became the center of the Russian decadent movement with Dmitry Merezhkovsky, Zinaida Gippius, Konstantin Balmont and Fyodor Sologub as stalwarts. Mikhail Albov edited the magazine in the 1890s.
