= Scorpion (publishing house) =

Defunct Russian publishing house

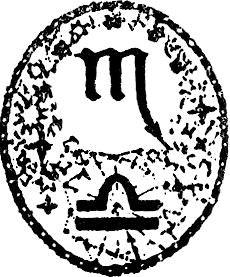
Logo of the publishing house

Scorpion (Скорпион) was a Russian publishing house which played an important role in the development of Russian symbolism in the early 1900s.

== History ==
Scorpion was founded in 1899 by the philanthropist and translator Sergey A. Polyakov, and by the poets Valery Bryusov and Jurgis Baltrušaitis. Konstantin Balmont was said to have suggested its title. Scorpion's initial agenda was two-fold: to meet the already well-developed demand for the so-called "Decadent" brand of literature and to form its own readership, interested in the "new art" of Russian modernism.

The preface to Scorpion's first ever catalog stated: "The Scorpion publishing house is interested mostly in works of art, but aims also for the fields of history of literature and aesthetic criticism. Willing to stand above the existing literary trends, it eagerly embraces everything that has real poetry to it regardless of which literary school any particular author belongs to. It is only vulgar things that we tend to avoid. Among Scorpion's other priorities is translating foreign authors who serve the New Art. The time has come to give our reader the opportunity to form their own opinions on new trends in literature."

The inclusion of the foreign literature into the Scorpion's fold was considered obligatory. This way the "European context" of the Russian symbolism was being highlighted. The first foreign book published by Scorpion, in March 1900, was Henrik Ibsen's When We Dead Awaken, translated by Polyakov and Baltrušaitis.

Bryusov praised Scorpion as the center of the New Art in Russia, having brought together the Moscow (Bryusov, Balmont, Andrei Bely) and Saint Petersburg's authors (Dmitry Merezhkovsky, Zinaida Gippius, Fyodor Sologub), the latter associated with Severny Vestnik magazine.

Closely associated with Scorpion were miriskussniki Léon Bakst and Konstantin Somov, as well as Victor Borisov-Musatov, Modest Durnov and Nikolai Feofilaktov, among others.

Scorpion, which had neither commercial success nor any academic background, proved to be instrumental in uniting the Russian symbolists into one single movement. The last book published here was Poetry like Magic by Konstantin Balmont in 1915.
