= Mikhail Albov =

Russian writer (1851–1911)

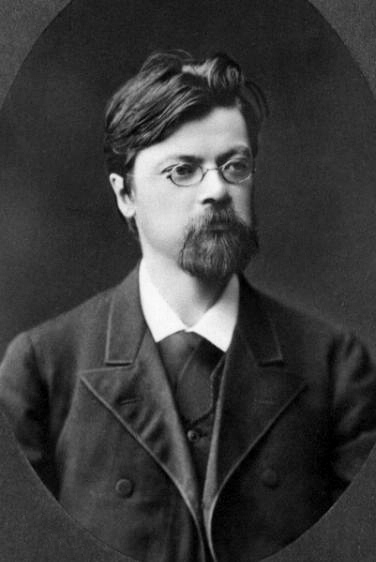
- Born: November 20, 1851; St Petersburg, Russian Empire
- Died: June 25, 1911 (aged 59); St Petersburg, Russian Empire

Mikhail Nilovich Albov (Russian: Михаи́л Ни́лович А́льбов; November 20, 1851 – June 25, 1911) was a writer from the Russian Empire.

== Biography ==
Albov was born in St Petersburg in 1851. From an early age he showed a love for reading. He was especially interested in foreign works such as Robinson Crusoe and David Copperfield. Nikolay Gogol's novel Dead Souls also made a deep impression on him. At the age of thirteen Albov's story The Memoirs of an Underground Lodger was published by the Peterburgsky Listok (St Petersburg News). After this success, he left school to focus on his literary efforts.

His first novel On the New Road appeared in 1866 and attracted general attention. In 1873, he returned to school and soon finished. He then studied at Saint Petersburg State University, where he graduated from the Faculty of Law in 1879. Upon graduating, he took a civil service post, but resigned it a few months later. In the 1890s he was the editor of the popular magazine The Northern Herald. He died in St Petersburg in 1911.
