= Vladimir Zeeler =

- Born: Vladimir Feofilovich Zeeler; Владимир Феофилович Зеелер; June 6, 1874; Kiev, Russian Empire
- Died: December 27, 1954 (aged 80); Paris, France
- Occupation: lawyer • politician • journalist • editor

Vladimir Feofilovich Zeeler (Russian: Владимир Феофилович Зеелер, 6 June 1874, Kiev, Ukraine, then Russian Empire, – 27 December 1954, Paris, France) was a Russian lawyer, state official and political activist, the Interior Minister in the short-lived South Russian Government; since 1919 a journalist, editor, memoirist and philanthropist, who for thirty years served as a Secretary of the Paris-based Union of Russian Writers and Journalists in Paris.

== Biography ==
A Kharkov University alumnus, Zeeler started his career as a lawyer in Rostov-on-Don where he also worked for the City Duma. An avid art collector, in 1910—1918 he was the head of the Rostov and Nakhichevan Fine Arts Society. Zeeler became involved in active politics in 1917 when, as a prominent member of the Constitutional Democratic Party, he became the head of its Don and Kuban regional Committee, which led to his being elected a Mayor of Rostov-on-Don. In his 28 October 1917 statement Zeeler condemned the Bolshevik-led October Revolution and on behalf of the Rostov Duma refused to sign the allegiance to those whom he referred to as 'bandits'.

He took an active part in financing and forming the regular White Army units and, after general Alexey Kaledin's suicide, supported his successor Ataman Anatoly Nazarov, serving for a while (according to Anton Denikin) as "an effective and zealous intermediary between the Volunteer Army on the one hand and the greedy Rostov plutocracy and our enemy, the revolutionary democracy, on the other." In 1919—1920 Zeeler was the Interior Minister at the Denikin-formed South Russian Government. Along with the remnants of the defeated White Army he left Russia and for the rest of his life resided in Paris. Zeeler's extensive art collection was nationalized and became part of the Don Regional Art Museum (later the Rostov-on-Don Regional Art Museum).

=== In France ===
In Paris, Vladimir Zeeler became a pivotal figure of the Russian emigration. In 1921 he joined the Committee for Helping the Russian Citizens abroad. He helped to organize and for thirty years was the secretary of the Union of Russian Writers and Journalists in Paris. A treasurer of the Union of Russian Lawyers in France and (since 1927) a secretary of the central committee of the Days of Russian Culture event, Zeeler toured with lectures, actively contributed to Russkaya Mysl (the Pyotr Struve-revived 1921-1927 version of the originally Moscow-based magazine) and was one of the editors of the book Commemorating the Ones Who Perished (Памяти погибших, 1929), dedicated to the memory of the Constitutional Democratic Party members who were killed in the 1918-1920 Russian Civil War.
