= Nadezhda Teffi =

Russian writer (1872–1952)

- Born: Nadezhda Alexandrovna Lokhvitskaya; 21 May [O.S. 9 May] 1872; Saint Petersburg, Russia
- Died: 6 October 1952 (aged 80); Paris, France
- Resting place: Sainte-Geneviève-des-Bois Russian Cemetery
- Occupations: Writer; playwright
- Relatives: Mirra Lokhvitskaya
- Writing career
- Pen name: Teffi

Nadezhda Alexandrovna Teffi (Russian: Наде́жда Алекса́ндровна Тэ́ффи; 21 May [O.S. 9 May] 1872 – 6 October 1952) was a Russian humorist writer. Together with Arkady Averchenko, she was one of the prominent authors of the magazine Novyi Satirikon. Her style is distinguished by two 'faces' of writing- the serious and the satirical, which she alternated between and often fused together to create a unique output of personal and political commentaries. Teffi's gift for humour was considered anomalous for a woman of her time, particularly due to well-known thinkers such as Henri Bergson and Arthur Schopenhauer who had declared that women were not capable of a sense of humour. Teffi would prove such thinkers wrong by skyrocketing to fame throughout Russia with her satirical writings, so much so that she had candies and perfume named after her.

== Biography ==
Teffi was born Nadezhda Lokhvitskaya into a family of gentry, at her family's estate in Volhynia Governorate; she was the second youngest of six or seven children. Her year of birth is variously reported in the range 1871–1876. Her father, Alexander Vladimirovich Lokhvitsky, a lawyer and scholar, was prominent in Saint Petersburg society. Her mother, Varvara Alexandrovna Goyer, was of French descent, a lover of poetry, and familiar with Russian and European literature. Teffi was first introduced to literature when, as a young girl, she read Childhood and Boyhood by Leo Tolstoy, and the fiction of Alexander Pushkin. All of her siblings wrote poetry. Her own first published poetry appeared in the journal, The North, in 1901 under her full name. In 1905 her first story, "The Day Has Passed", was published in the journal The Fields, also under her full name. It had been written in 1904 and first submitted to the journal God's World, which had turned it down. In the years surrounding the Russian Revolution of 1905 she published stories with political overtones against the Tsarist government.

In an answer to a questionnaire given to writers in 1911, Teffi said the following about her early literary work:

The element of observation dominated my fantasy. I liked drawing caricatures and writing satirical verses. My first published work was written under the influence of Chekhov.

When she was 17, Teffi married Vladislav Buchinsky, a Polish lawyer and judge; they settled at Buchinsky's estate at Ryki, near Warsaw but separated in 1900. They had two daughters, Waleria and Helena; some say the couple also had a son, but this has "never been confirmed." In 1901, her first poem, Mne snilsia son, bezumnyi i prekrasnyi... ("I had a dream, mad and wonderful..."), was published in the journal, Sever ("North"); Edythe Haber explains that the poem was submitted to the journal by her friends, without her consent and Teffi considered the poem to be "awful."

She was a contributor to the first Bolshevik journal The New Life, whose editorial board included writers like Maxim Gorky and Zinaida Gippius. Her best work appeared in Satiricon magazine and the popular journal Russkoye Slovo ("Russian Word"). In Russia, she published many collections of poetry and short stories, and a number of one-act plays. She first used the pseudonym "Teffi" with the publication in 1907 of her one-act play The Woman Question. She provided two separate explanations of the name; that it was suggested to her in relation to a friend whose servant called him "Steffi", or that it came from the English rhyme "Taffy was a Welshman/Taffy was a thief."

Initially a supporter of the October Revolution, she rapidly became disenchanted with the Bolsheviks, going so far as to refer to Vladimir Lenin as "the mother-in-law of the Russian Revolution". In 1918 she left St Petersburg, and on the pretext of a theatrical tour, travelled with a group of actors across Russia and Ukraine to Odessa, eventually reaching Istanbul. In 1920, she settled in Paris and began publishing her works in the Russian newspapers there. In her defection, she wrote a vivid account of her escape from the Soviet Union through the chaos of the Russia Civil War (Memories, 1928–1930) and published several collections of short stories and poems and her only novel An Adventure Novel (1932). The critic Anastasiya Chebotarevskaya compared Teffi's stories, which she said were "highly benevolent in their elegiac tone and profoundly humanitarian in their attitudes", to the best stories by Anton Chekhov. Teffi is buried at Sainte-Geneviève-des-Bois Russian Cemetery in France.

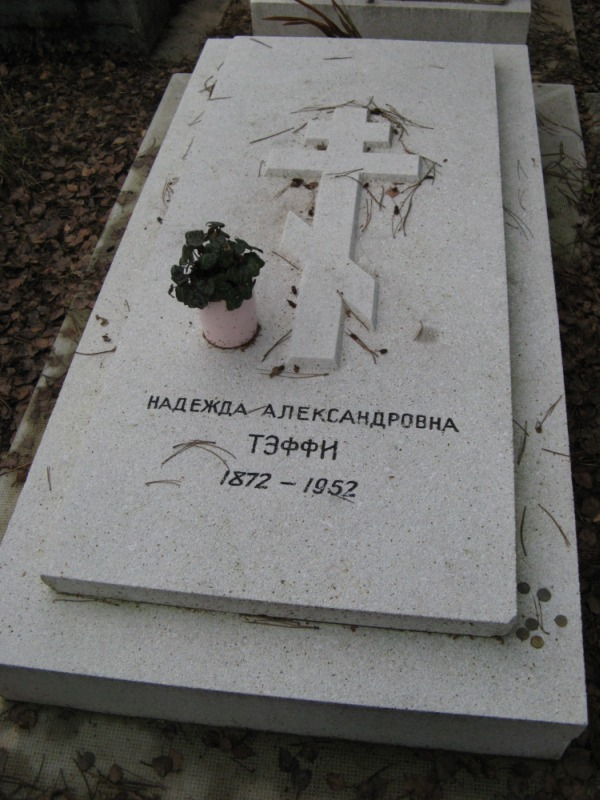
Teffi's gravestone

In 2018, Edythe Haber's biography of Teffi was published, the first such work in any language.

== Revolutionary activities ==
Following the Russian Revolution of 1905, and with a mounting spirit of rebellion in Russia, Teffi was persuaded to put her literary talents toward a revolutionary cause. She was introduced by a friend to prominent members of the Bolshevik party, including Lev Kamenev, Alexander Bogdanov, and Alexandra Kollontai. She published her poem The Banner of Freedom in the Geneva Bolshevik Newspaper Vpered ("Forward") in March of 1905. The poem is written in the voice of “worker bees” – lower class seamstresses whose hard work provides the wealthiest of society with their luxurious clothes. In the poem, the bees symbolically describe the “bloody banner of freedom” that is crafted out of their hard work and misery as they sew red strips of silk together for their employers. This was only the first of a string of writings and amusing commentaries Teffi would publish with a newly rebellious tone, mixing her 'serious face' with her humorous one as she satirized the tsarist regime and its repressive authority.

As revolutionary events intensified throughout 1905, the tsar were pressured into implementing various new civil liberties for its citizens. One such outcome of this was the emergence of an opposition press, and Teffi began contributing regularly to the first legal Bolshevik newspaper in Russia, Novaia Zhizn' ("New Life"). She became a part of the editorial board as a non-party member, along with other artists and intellectuals who had similarly developed revolutionary tendencies during this period. These contributors made up a diverse literary community, including the likes of symbolist Konstantin Balmont, realist Ivan Bunin, and revolutionary Maxim Gorky. This unique literary union between the social democrats and the decadents garnered a broad audience that spanned from the working class to the intelligentsia, the latter of which was greatly due to Teffi's popularity.

== Emigre writings ==
Following the 1917 Russian Revolution, Teffi became disillusioned with the state of writing publications in Russia and followed many Russian artists in emigrating to Paris. This period of Teffi's writings is heavily focused on themes of nostalgia and longing for the lost motherland. She also explores the ways that nostalgia can lead to a withdrawal from social and intellectual life and the absurdity of displacement. Natalia Starostina argues that this phase of Teffi's writing is characterized by an overly-nostalgic and idealized depiction of pre-revolutionary tsarist Russia, the same government which she had formerly critiqued in her writing, thus contributing to the myth of the "Belle-Epoque" in Russian society. She states, "Russian émigré nostalgia became interwoven with mythmaking and helped the writers to reinvent themselves and to rewrite the history of their lives and their countries, either as a tragedy or a tragicomedy, or as a romantic tale.

== English translations ==
- A Modest Talent and Diamond Dust (one-act plays), and Talent (story), from A Russian Cultural Revival, University of Tennessee Press, 1981.
- All About Love (story collection), Ardis Publishers, 1985.
- The Woman Question (one-act play) and Walled Up (story), from An Anthology of Russian Women's Writing, Oxford, 1994.
- Time (story), from The Portable Twentieth Century Reader, Penguin Classics, 2003.
- Love and A Family Journey (stories), from Russian Stories from Pushkin to Buida, Penguin Classics, 2005.
- When the Crayfish Whistled: A Christmas Horror, A Little Fairy Tale, Baba Yaga (text of a picture book), The Dog, and Baba Yaga (essay), from Russian Magic Tales from Pushkin to Platonov, Penguin Classics, 2012.
- Subtly Worded (stories), Pushkin Press, 2014; translated by Robert and Elizabeth Chandler, Anne-Marie Jackson and others.
- Tolstoy, Rasputin, Others, and Me: The best of Teffi (story collection), New York Review Books, 2016: published simultaneously in the UK by Pushkin Press as Rasputin and Other Ironies; translated by Robert and Elizabeth Chandler, Anne-Marie Jackson and others..
- Memories: From Moscow to the Black Sea (memoir of 1918–20 journey to exile), New York Review Books, 2016: published simultaneously in the United Kingdom by Pushkin Press; translated by Robert and Elizabeth Chandler, Anne-Marie Jackson, Irina Steinberg and others.
- Other Worlds: Peasants, Pilgrims, Spirits, Saints (story collection), New York Review Books, 2021: published simultaneously in the UK by Pushkin Press (August 2021); translated by Robert and Elizabeth Chandler, Anne-Marie Jackson and others.

== German translations ==
- Teffy alias Nadeshda Lochwizkaja: Champagner aus Teetassen : meine letzten Tage in Russland, Aus dem Russ. von Ganna-Maria Braungardt, Berlin : Aufbau, 2014, ISBN 978-3-351-03412-2
