= Lev Kobylinsky =

Poet and translator (1879–1947)

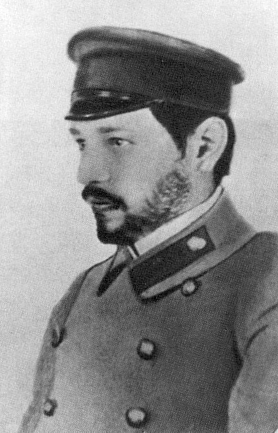
Lev Kobylinsky

Lev Lvovich Kobylinsky SJ (Russian: Лев Львович Кобылинский; 2 August 1879, Moscow, Russian Empire – 17 November 1947, Locarno, Switzerland) was a poet, translator, theorist of symbolism, the Christian philosopher and historian of literature. His pseudonym was Ellis.

== Biography ==
Lev Kobylinsky was born in Moscow. He was an illegitimate son of the director of private gymnasium Lev Polivanoff. In 1902, he graduated from the law faculty of Moscow University. Together with Andrei Bely organized a poetic circle of " Argonauts ". In the years 1904–1909 an active member of the magazine Libra. During 1910–1917, along with Andrew White and Emily Medtner founded the publishing house "Musaget". He emigrated to Switzerland in 1911. Like his friend Andrei Bely, became interested in anthroposophy of Rudolf Steiner, but later he accepted Catholicism and joined the Society of Jesus. Ellis wrote literary and philosophical works in German. He died in Locarno, Switzerland.

== Alignment ==
Christian worldview Ellis Kobylinsky was not orthodox.

Ellis defended the idea of reincarnation in his view the multiplicity of personalities - the result of the sinfulness of human nature. He considered the highest form of art symbolism and was a supporter of the aristocratic individualism and fan of Friedrich Nietzsche. His intuition considered as the essence of the symbolic contemplation, contemplation logically distinguishing purely intellectual, artistic and mystical.

== Creativity ==
Ellis's poems "written under the influence of Soloviev, Bryusov, Bely and Balmont, according to the religious understanding of the world and the quest that come from the children's proximity to supermaterial world, that of religion permeated the life of the Middle Ages".

Criticism

- "Immorteli." In 2 vols., 1904
- "Russian Symbolists', 1910
- «Vigilemus», 1914

Collections of poetry

- «Stigmata», 1911
- "Argo: Two books of poetry and the poem", 1914

Philosophical writings

- Platon und Solowjew, Mainz, 1926
- Christliche Weisheit, Basel, 1929 ("Christian wisdom")
- WA Joukowski, Paderborn, 1933
- Alexander Puschkin, der religiose Genius Russlands, Ölten, 1948
- "The Kingdom of Saint Peter"

== Publications ==
- Ellis. Poems. Tomsk: Aquarius, 1996.
- Ellis. Russian Symbolists. Tomsk: Aquarius, 1996. - 288.
- Ellis. Unpublished and Uncollected. Tomsk: Aquarius, 2000. - 460.
- Baudelaire "Flowers of Evil" and the prose poem in translation Ellis. Tomsk: Aquarius, 1993. - 400 s.
