= Ieronim Yasinsky =

Russian novelist, poet, literary critic and essayist

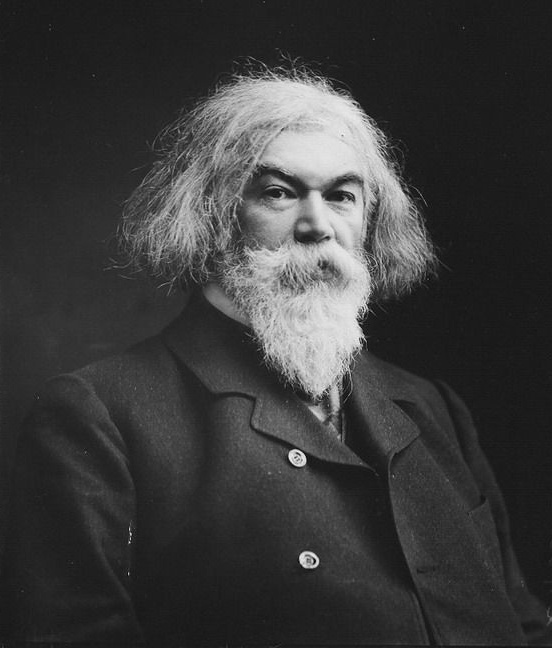
- Born: 30 April 1850; Kharkov, Russian Empire
- Died: 31 December 1931 (aged 81); Leningrad, Russian SFSR, Soviet Union
- Writing career
- Genres: Fiction, memoirs, criticism

Ieronim Ieronimovich Yasinsky (Russian: Иерони́м Иерони́мович Яси́нский; April 30 [O.S. April 18] 1850 – December 31, 1931) was a Russian novelist, poet, literary critic and essayist. Among the numerous pseudonyms he used, were Maxim Belinsky, Nezavisimy ('The Independent One') and M. Tchunosov.

== Biography ==
Yasinsky was born in Kharkov, Russian Empire (now Ukraine) to the lawyer and landlord Ieronim Yasinsky, a nobleman of Polish origins, and Olga Maksimovna Belinskaya, the daughter of a 1812 Borodino hero Colonel Maxim Belinsky (whose name he later used as a literary pseudonym). From the age of eleven, Yasinsky began to write verses and recite them at family literary and musical parties.

Yasinsky, who received a good home education, continued studying in the Chernigov gymnasium and in 1868 enrolled into the Kiev University, which he left in 1871, after marrying V.P.Ivanova. A person of strong character, keenly interested in women's liberation movement, she exerted strong influence upon her husband. In September 1870, having returned to Chernigov, Yasinsky debuted as an essayist and started to publish articles in two newspapers, Kievsky Vestnik and Kievsky Telegraph. Many of these earlier pieces later found their way into The Kiev Stories (1885) collection.

Yasinsky's first short novels (Natashka, 1881; The Sleeping Beauty, 1883) were lauded by the Russian leftist literary elite (Mikhail Saltykov-Shchedrin in particular) who hailed their author as "the new Garshin." Several years later his major novels (Irinarkh Plutarkhov, 1886; The Old Friend, 1887; The Great Man, 1888, and later Under Satan's Cloak, 1909), fell under sharp criticism for allegedly ridiculing the "revolutionary movement." Yasinsky saw his mission in "compiling an encyclopedia of the Russian intelligentsia types, as observed in all possible aspects of life." Anton Chekhov, who once characterized him as "either an honest garbage collector or a sly crook," was unconvinced. Similarly Maxim Gorky, who treated Yasinsky's books as cheap anti-revolutionary pamphlets, once described their author as "dirty and spiteful old man".

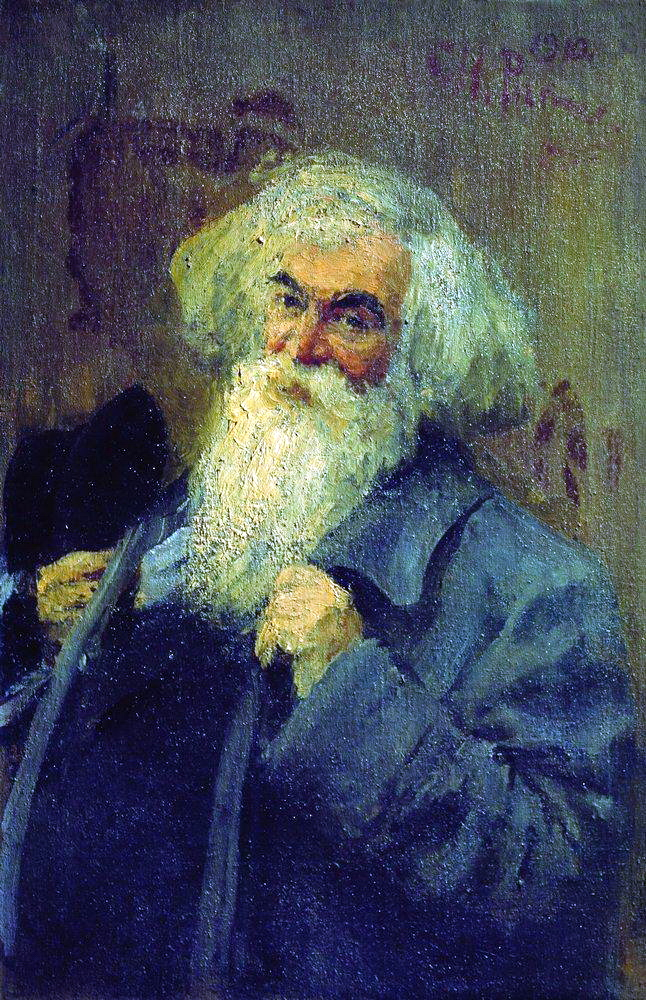
Portrait of Yasinsky by Ilya Repin, 1910

Ieronim Yasinsky accepted the February Revolution and even declared himself "an instant Bolshevik" after the October Revolution. He worked for Proletkult, edited Soviet magazines (Krasny ogonyok, Plamya, 1918–1919), wrote science fiction for children and translated Friedrich Engels's poem "The Evening" in 1923, but still was unpopular with critics. In retrospect, his book of memoirs The Novel of My Life (1926) has been recognized as an insightful and valuable documentation of the Russian literary and cultural life of the late 19th-early 20th century, as were his biographical essays on Saltykov-Shchedrin, Garshin, Leykin and Chekhov. He died, aged 81, in Leningrad, USSR.

== Selected works ==
- Natashka (1881)
- The Sleeping Beauty (1883)
- The Kiev Stories (1885)
- Irinarkh Plutarkhov (1886)
- The Old Friend (1887)
- The Great Man (1888)
- Under Satan's Cloak (1909)
- The Novel of My Life (1926)
