= Alexander Ivanovich Urusov =

Russian lawyer and writer (1843–1900)

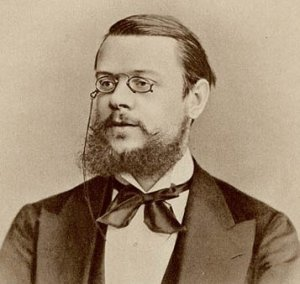
- Born: Александр Иванович Урусов; April 2, 1843; Moscow, Russian Empire
- Died: July 16, 1900 (aged 57); Moscow, Russian Empire
- Occupations: lawyer, literary and theatre critic, translator

Prince Alexander Ivanovich Urusov (Russian: Александр Иванович Урусов, April 2, 1843, Moscow, Russian Empire, — July 16, 1900, Moscow) was a Russian lawyer, literary critic, translator and philanthropist.

== Biography ==
Alexander Urusov was born in Moscow. The Urusov family was of Tatar ancestry, ennobled during the times of Alexander I. His father, Colonel Ivan Alexandrovich Urusov, was the Moscow military chief Arseny Zakrevsky's deputy. His mother Princess Yekaterina Ivanovna Urusova (née Elsnits) belonged to the aristocratic Naryshkin family. After graduating the Moscow University in 1866 he joined a Saint Petersburg district court as a lawyer and became famous after achieving the acquittal of Marfa Volokhova, a peasant woman falsely accused of her husband's murder. According to Alexander Hertzen, "by the late 1860s Urusov has become the major star of the Russian advocatory."

In 1871 Alexander Urusov successfully defended in court several members of the so-called Nechayev group: some of his clients were acquitted. According to a secret agent's report to his Special Corps of Gendarmes's chief, Urusov "in Moscow [was] quite enjoying his popularity as a people's tribune."

A year later in Geneva Urusov issued a statement advising the Swiss authorities against extraditing Sergey Nechayev to Russia. Accused on this account of "maintaining criminal contacts with revolutionaries," in September of that year Urusov was arrested in Moscow and deported to Finland where he stayed in exile until 1876. "I very much hope that he will stay there under the real, not imaginary police surveillance," Tsar Alexander II inscribed upon the Urusov's police file.

Banned from practice in court, Urusov turned to journalism and became a popular literary and theatre critic, writing under the pseudonym Alexander Ivanov. He was a friend of Ivan Turgenev, regularly corresponded with Anton Chekhov, was considered an authority on the French poetry and literature (Baudelaire and Flaubert in particular) and later exerted the strong influence upon the circle of the young Russian symbolists. Urusov was the first to recognize a major talent in Konstantin Balmont and helped him publish his book Under the Northern Sky (Saint Petersburg, 1894). In his essays and articles Urusov (who described himself as "a liberal") was a fierce critic of social injustice in Russia, propagating the same principles he upheld in court.

In the late 1870s Urusov moved to Warsaw and made himself a name there as a court prosecutor. In 1878 another famous Russian lawyer Anatoly Koni assisted his return to Saint Petersburg where he joined the city's regional court as a prosecutor's assistant. Urusov was permitted to return to a barrister's practice in 1881 by the Minister of justice Dmitry Nabokov's special order. In 1891 he became known in Europe, helping to acquit the French writer Léon Bloy, accused of defamation.

In 1890s Alexander Urusov's health deteriorated. He died in 1900 after prolonged illness. Fellow lawyer and writer Sergey Andreevsky, speaking at the funeral, called Urusov "the first great role model for a defending lawyer that Russia has ever had."
