= Budilnik =

Russian illustrated satirical journal

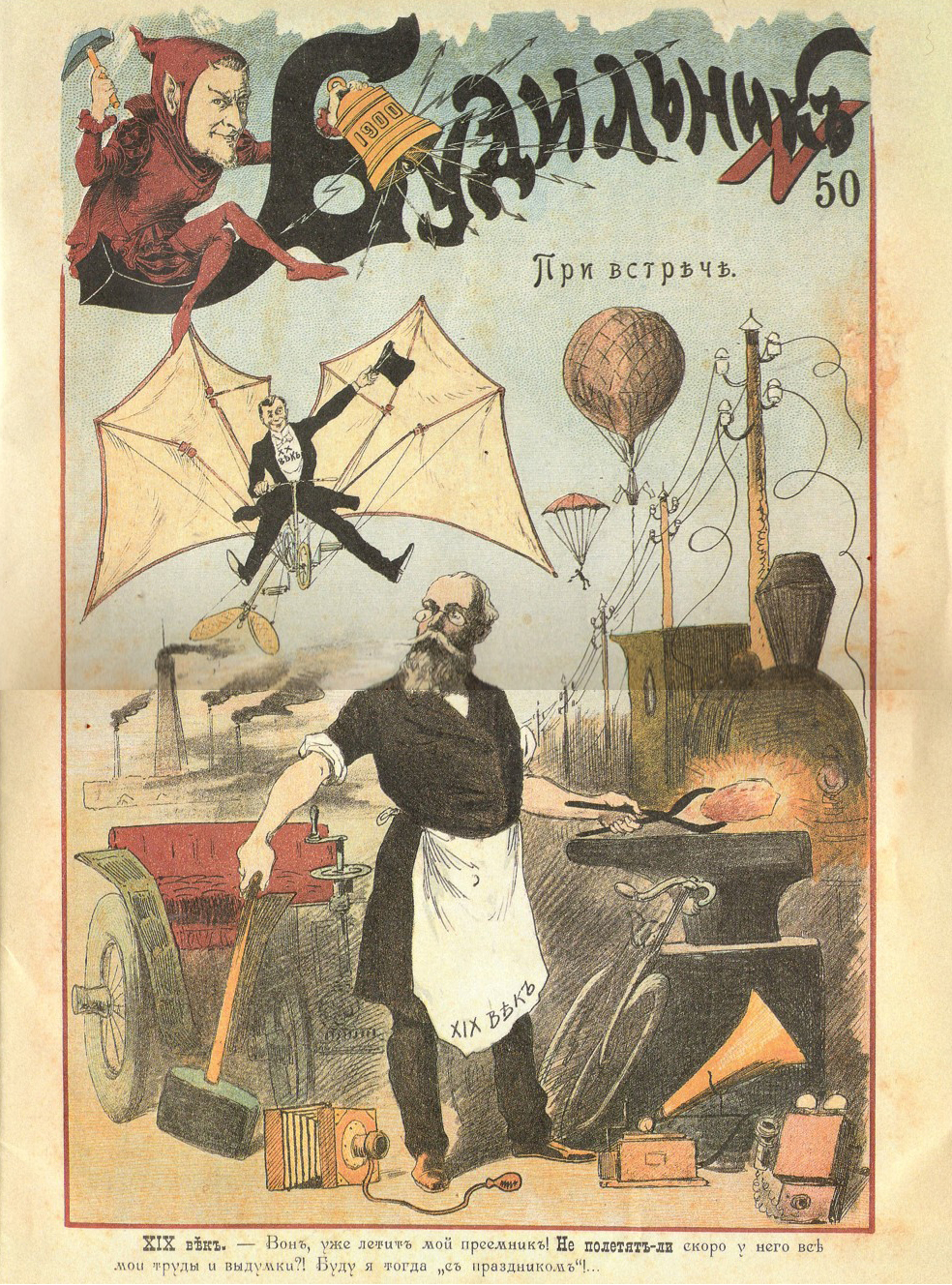
- Editor: Nikolai Stepanov (1865-1870)
- Categories: Satirical magazine
- Frequency: Weekly
- Founded: 1865
- Final issue: 1917
- Based in: Saint Petersburg (1865—1871); Moscow (1873—1917)
- Language: Russian

Budilnik (Russian: Будильник, Alarm clock) was a weekly Russian illustrated satirical journal published originally, in 1865—1871, in Saint Petersburg, then, in 1873—1917, in Moscow.

== History and profile ==
The magazine was founded by the artist and caricaturist Nikolai Stepanov (formerly a co-editor of Iskra, with Vasily Kurochkin) who for six years was its editor-in-chief. During this time Bidilnik was (alongside Iskra) the leading force of political satire in Russia, warring with the right wing and conservative press, mostly Katkov's Moskovskiye Vedomosti and Krayevsky's Golos. The magazine's circulation reached its peak in 1866 (around 4200) and since then was slowly declining. In mid-1870s Budilnik became an apolitical, purely entertaining journal. Among his later editors were A.P. Sukhov, A.D. Kurepin, L.N. Utkin, E.G. Arnold, Nikolai Kicheyev, Vladimir Levinsky.

Among the authors who contributed to it regularly were Pyotr Weinberg (in 1866-1867 the head of its literary section, pen names: Heine form Tambov, The Melancholic), Liodor Palmin, Ivan Dmitriyev (originally the head of its literary section), Gavriil Zhulev (also: The Grieving Poet), Nikolai Zlatovratsky (N. Cherevanin), Dmitry Minayev (Literature Domino, 40 Year Old Dandy, Dark Man), Alexander Levitov, Nikolai Leykin, Fyodor Reshetnikov, Vladimir Shchiglev, Mikhail Stopanovsky, Konstantin Stanyukovich, Gleb Uspensky (as D. Petrov, V. Pechkin), Anton Chekhov (Antosha Chekhonte, G. Baldastov, My Brother's Brother, Patientless Doctor).
