= Alexey Ivanov-Classic =

Russian writer and poet (1841–1894)

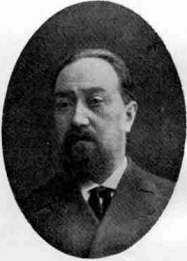
- Born: Alexey Fyodorovich Ivanov; 14 February 1841; Saint Petersburg, Russian Empire
- Died: 15 January 1894 (aged 52); Saint Petersburg, Russian Empire
- Occupations: Poet, writer

Alexey Fyodorovich Ivanov (Russian: Алексей Фёдорович Иванов, 14 February 1841, Saint Petersburg, Russian Empire – 15 January 1894, Saint Petersburg) was a Russian writer and poet, better known under his pen name Ivanov-Classic (Иванов-Классик).

Having debuted as a published author in 1861 (Peterburgsky Vestnik, "On the Death of Nikitin"), Ivanov was spotted by Vasily Kurochkin who invited him to become a major contributor to the Iskra magazine. It was there (as well as in Delo, Zanoza, Budilnik, Oskolki and Vsemirnaya Illyustratsia) that his numerous poems (he preferred to refer to them as 'songs') were published to make their author one of the best-known masters of humorous and satirical verse of his time in Russia. Many of them were collected in the books Pesni Klassika (The Classic's Songs, 1873), Na rassvete (At Dawn, 1882), Stikhotvoreniya (Poems, 1891). He also authored the short novel Besputnye deti (Wayward Children, 1874), as well as Vesyoly poputchik (Jolly Companion, 1889), a compilation of travel sketches and stories he wrote during his numerous journeys, to Austria, Italy, Germany, as well over Siberia, Ukraine and Caucasus.
