= Nikolai Uspensky =

Russian writer

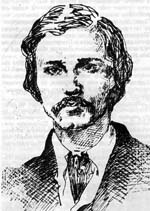
- Born: 31 May 1837; Stupino, Tula Governorate, Russian Empire
- Died: 2 November 1889 (aged 52); Moscow, Russian Empire
- Occupations: Writer, teacher
- Relatives: Gleb Uspensky
- Writing career
- Period: 1860s–1880s

Nikolai Vasilyevich Uspensky (Russian: Никола́й Васи́льевич Успе́нский; 31 May 1837 – 2 November 1889) was a Russian writer, and a cousin of fellow writer Gleb Uspensky. Uspensky wrote extensively about the realities of peasant life in rural Russia around the time of the Emancipation Act of 1861 by Tsar Alexander II, achieving critical and commercial success. After experiencing increasing alienation and career decline, Uspensky committed suicide on 2 November 1889.

== Biography ==
Nikolai Vasilyevich Uspensky was born on 31 May (Old Style 18 May), 1837, in Stupino, a small village in Tula Governorate, Russian Empire, to a local clergyman. He had seven siblings, brothers Ivan, Alexander and Mikhail, and sisters Anna, Maria, Elizaveta and Seraphima. Despite his relatively privileged position as the son of a priest, Uspensky grew up surrounded by poverty and alcoholism-driven violence, and frequently socialized with peasant children and often labored with them. "While me and brother Ivan were aspiring to the masters' children's lifestyle, Nikolai was different: he ploughed, sawn, mowed and was often making nightwatch trips into the fields," his brother Mikhail later remembered.

In 1848, Uspensky joined the theological seminary in Tula where he was flogged on a daily basis. According to Korney Chukovsky,

Executions of this sort were the only pedagogical method known in this school. Flogging, vodka, bribery, cards, the atmosphere of servility and betrayal, outward piety and secret debauchery—such were the basic elements of Nikolai's upbringing for more than ten years. One thing he could take refuge in were wild shenanigans... in which his brilliant talents, otherwise pent up, could be realized to some extent. For, despite things that were going on around him his mirth was fountain-like, making him perform every minute some kind of trick, practical joke or mystification.

The only person who took interest in Uspensky's life was his uncle, Ivan Uspensky, a wealthy Tula-based state official. Ivan had a son, future writer Gleb, who was forbidden to communicate with "dirty bursaks" (as pupils of seminary [bursa] were known), and who every morning was taken to school in a carriage. This in itself provided enough reason for Nikolai to hate his cousin Gleb. "We are brothers with him, in law, of course. Two Lazaruses, he—the rich one, me the poor. He a son to a local government secretary, me a country boy, son of a poor priest. He rolled like cheese in butter in his youth, I gnawed my crust. He left school with all kinds of diplomas, I remained an undergraduate forever," Nikolai Uspensky later was quoted to say.

Uspensky was not a good student. He spent most of his time in local traktirs, playing pool and getting drunk, and was described as a "haggard loafer going on a downward spiral," but it was in those days that he started writing. In 1856, prior to graduation, Uspensky left the seminary and moved to Saint Petersburg to enroll in the Medical Surgical Academy. In less than a year, though, he was expelled after a bizarre incident in which he vandalized a medical cabinet, apparently without any reason. He joined the St. Petersburg University historical and philological faculty, but soon left it too.

=== Writing career ===
In 1857, Syn Otechestva published his first two stories, "Old Woman" and "The Christening", both ignored by critics. His third one, "The Good Existence", was published in 1858 by Sovremennik, and made an impression; soon the author signed a contract, making a commitment to publish his work in this magazine exclusively. Besides, the editor Nikolai Nekrasov asked the Saint Petersburg University rector Pletnyov to support Uspensky financially. Nekrasov saw in Uspensky the possible pivotal figure for the magazine whose major contributors, Turgenev, Tolstoy and Grigorovich, felt no affiliation with its new, more radical policy and were beginning to look elsewhere. Also in Sovremennik came out the short stories "Piglet", "Scenes from a Village Holiday", "Grushka" and "The Dragon" (1858), "The Holy Day's Eve", "A Village Apothecary", "Bachelor" and "The Road Scenes" (1859), "The Country Newspaper", "The Evening", "Food Train" and autobiographical "Brusilov" (1860).

Uspensky’s stories, describing the poverty and the misery of the peasants, the lives of Russian clergymen, and raznochintsy intellectuals, attracted the attention of many prominent radicals. In 1860 Nikolai Dobrolyubov recommended several of his stories for the school reader compiled by Alexey Galakhov. Chernyshevsky had many private talks with him, and the conservative Russian press, when criticizing Sovremennik, often mentioned the two in one breath, regarding Uspensky "a loudmouth for Chernyshevsky's ideas."

==== In Europe ====
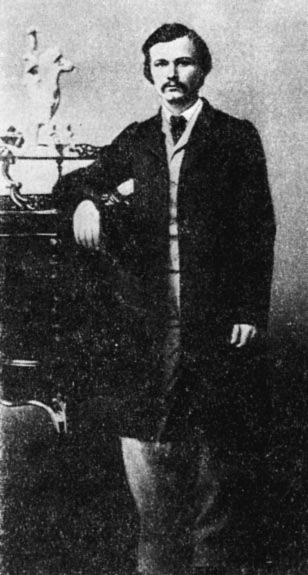
Nikolay Uspensky, in 1860s

In January 1861, Uspensky went abroad to travel through Italy and Switzerland, and spent some time in France, financed by Nekrasov who was waiting from him a big novel. But, according to the biographer Korney Chukovsky, "…he bought himself dandy clothes, a wide-brimmed hat and started sauntering the Paris boulevards like a rich tourist, as if foreseeing this to be his last bright glimpse of life." On several occasions in Paris Uspensky met Turgenev, who was in the process of working upon his Fathers and Sons novel, and was in need of a first-hand material. Having only read of 'nihilists' in the Russian press he saw the chance to meet the real one as a godsend. In a letter to Pavel Annenkov, Turgenev wrote: "A misanthrope by the name of Uspensky, Nikolay has been here recently and dined at my place. He saw it as his duty for some reason to slag Pushkin and was assuring me that what the latter was only doing in his poems, was exclaiming incessantly: "Rise, rise to fight for our saintly Rus!" Something tells me he'll soon go mad." Thinking apparently that such 'misanthropic' view on Pushkin was typical for the 'new men', Turgenev used the quoted phrase in his novel, giving it to his character Bazarov.

In Rome, Uspensky met Vasily Botkin, an expert in antique culture, who tried to share his love for it with his companion. But Uspensky believed that Rome looked "ugly". "None of the art masterpieces could shield off from me emaciated faces and hopes in boots of poor people," he later wrote. In 15 years time he published his travellers' sketches, very naive, superficial and patchy, but full of sympathy for suffering lower class.

==== 1861 reform ====
Uspensky's attitude towards the Emancipation reform of 1861 was hostile, close to that of Chernyshevsky, as both men saw attempts to improve the life of a Russian peasant class by gradual reform as unacceptable. "I saw this [reform] coming long ago and felt no interest in the Manifest whatsoever, never even read the Charter,” he wrote to Sluchevsky. His best known stories of the time, the anti-liberal "Country Apothecary" and "Village Theatre", targeted people posing as 'enlighteners' as vile and dangerous schemers.

A few years later, on Andrey Krayevsky's recommendation, the then-minister of education Alexander Golovnin commissioned Uspensky to inspect schools in Moscow, Tula and Oryol governorates, and advice upon possible measures of improving the quality of teaching there. Uspensky in his report maintained that educational reform made no sense in rural areas devastated by Alexander II's reforms, as what the Russian peasant needed first was having enough to eat. He also opposed the Narodnik movement, which held the obschina (rural community) as their ideal, seeing it as just another mechanism for making rich peasants richer and push the poor men further into poverty. "The contemporary Russian peasantry is hopeless, it won't ever resurrect, the sick one is going to die," wrote Uspensky in one of his articles, "Notes of a Country Landlord".

There was a basic difference between Uspensky's nihilism and the ideology of new Sovremennik. While the latter rejected liberal reforms seeing them as a hindrance for the forthcoming social upheaval they were hoping for, the former had no specific reason for his hatred for all things coming from the government. Chukovsky wrote "…He's never even made an attempt to try and understand the political doctrine behind the magazine that's been fostering him as the driving force in a peasant revolution... So when Chernyshevsky used his early prose to support his own theory about Russian peasants being ready to riot, Uspensky felt apparently so indifferent to the latter as to leave Sovremennik for the enemy camp right after its publication".

==== Scandals and decline in popularity ====
In late summer of 1861, Uspensky returned from his Paris vacation and, after a short stay at Stupino, his remote home village in Tula Governorate, went to Saint Petersburg where his debut short story collection Stories by N.V.Uspensky had been just published to a great success. "This unexpected success turned his head around", wrote Yakov Polonsky later. "Thank God, I am not devoid of talent. Don't know about the future, but now for my antagonists I'll stand like a bone in throat, won't let them get a step ahead of me," Uspensky told the journalist Martyanov. Uspensky's 'antagonists' were a group of emerging raznotchinsky writers—Alexander Levitov, Nikolai Pomyalovsky, Vasily Sleptsov—whom he was now regarding as dangerous competitors and, according to Martyanov, referred to as 'mite', 'scum' and 'dirt'.

Having spent eight months in Europe on Nekrasov's money (2,500 roubles according to Chukovsky), suddenly accused the later of underpaying him and an ugly scandal broke out. In January 1862, Uspensky asked Chernyshevsky to summon a court of arbitration to resolve the financial issue, the latter refused, and said that should such a hearing ever take place, he will be on Nekrasov's side. In early1862, Uspensky severed all ties with the magazine and retired to Stupino, very ill and depressed. This self-imposed exile lasted for a short time as Otechestvennye Zapiski, Lev Tolstoy, and Ivan Turgenev began encouraging Uspensky to return to writing. Turgenev, who at the time himself was openly accusing Nekrasov of financial wrongdoings, accepted Uspensky's version of events wholeheartedly. In 1862, Tolstoy invited Uspensky to teach Russian grammar to his Yasnaya Polyana school. Some years later Tolstoy told one of his guests, Zakharyin: "I rate Nikolai Uspensky much higher than the second one, Gleb, who's well behind in terms of both realism and artistry." After a quarrel with Tolstoy, Nikolai Uspensky moved to Spasskoye, Turgenev's estate where the latter granted him a plot of land. Again, this stay was short, as one relative stated: "Being carried away at the time with ideas of agricultural innovations, Nikolai Vasilyevich began cultivating his soil in peculiar manner, fertilizing it with salt and steamed animal's bones... None of this worked of course and he, knowing nothing about agriculture, has left Spasskoye disgruntled." For several years Uspensky travelled through Russia, teaching in numerous schools and gymnasiums in Tula governorate, Orenburg, Saint Petersburg, and back at Yasnaya Polyana again, never staying at one place for long. Finally, driven by financial difficulties, he returned to Spasskoye to sell the land he had been given. Horrified, Turgenev asked his manager to interfere, "Should this man be so dishonest as to sell this plot to a third party?" he wondered in a letter. Negotiations proved futile and only after Turgenev agreed to buy back his own land that Uspensky agreed to leave the estate, still accusing the host of "having taken back his own gift." Turgenev wrote to Polonsky: "Nikolai Uspensky is a finished man, we might as well forget about him."

During the 1860s Uspensky's work appeared occasionally in Otechestvennye Zapisky, Vestnik Evropy, Iskra, Russky Vestnik, Grazhdanin and some other magazines and newspapers, attracting little attention. In 1866 Uspensky's first novelette, Fyodor Petrovich, was released. In retrospect it has been regarded as arguably the first piece of work in Russian literature to show the emergence of capitalism in rural Russia, but the contemporary critics ignored it. His next novelet, Old Things in an Old Way (Старое – по-старому, 1870) published by Vestnik Evropy, targeted liberal values in general and the institution of zemstvo in particular. A romantic idyll called Yegorka the Shepherd (Vestnik Evropy) where for the first time virtuous characters dominated the plot came out in 1871 and was ignored, too. "Defeated... He returned to his backwater Tula village to submerge himself into the petty routine and, totally discarding his own literary past, started to write small sketches on microscopic themes. Even his language, once rich and colourful, lost its liveliness and became bland and pompous," Korney Chukovsky wrote. All four of Nikolai Uspensky's short stories collections (published in 1871, 1872, 1875 and 1883) were either ignored or lambasted by the press.

=== Family ===
In 1878, 42-year-old Uspensky married a 16-year-old woman called Elizaveta, the daughter of a rich local priest who disapproved of their relationship and refused her financial support. Uspensky responded with a short story about an affluent clergyman who drives his daughter to consumption by plunging her into poverty. Three years later Elizaveta indeed died of tuberculosis but the reason for this was the nomadic lifestyle of her husband, who was moving from one village to another, dragging his wife and their infant daughter behind. All the while he continued to wage war against his father-in-law, accusing him of financial crimes, writing letters to officials and staging public meetings to support his case. "It was painful to see how much talent and pathos has been wasted in those petty quarrels, but the root of the tragedy was that, having once risen from mires of provincial darkness, he—unlike many authors of the same raznochntsy breed (Chernyshevsky, Dobrolyubov, Pomyalovsky, Eliseev, Levitov)—once the literary world ejected him, returned to where he came from and sank down there," Chukovsky wrote. Having buried his wife in 1881, Uspensky took with him a harmonica, a stuffed crocodile and his two-year-old daughter Olga, and embarked upon the life of a tramp artiste, entertaining drunken audiences with literature 'lectures' and self-styled musical shows (featuring Olga dancing, dressed as a boy), looking for a glass of vodka by way of payment. Relatives attempted to kidnap Olga from Uspensky, but he would fight them off. Occasionally attempts were successful, and then Uspensky arrived to 'besiege' the house. "For me those were times of many tears. As a young man he was so kind, handsome and intelligent. And there he was now, sitting in a ditch, grey-haired, horrible-looking. I used to send him some bread and cried watching him, eating it in the dirt," remembered Elizaveta Vasilyevna, his sister, the major force behind those 'kidnappings'. At the age of ten Olga settled at her grandfather's house, and her desperate father started flooding his relatives with letters, written in a strange pseudo-religious style. For some time the ex-nihilist was assuring his friends (all of them local criminals known by nicknames only) that his intention was to make a holy trip to a monastery, where some 'inner voice' apparently summoned him, but that came to nothing and soon he resumed his 'literary gigs', keeping lives of martyr writers highest on his "price list", at the bottom of which resided Pushkin whom he still thought worthless.

=== Last years ===
In his last years Uspensky became friends with the bohemian author Ivan Kondratyev (known as 'The Poet of Nikolsky market-place') who contributed to Razvlechenye magazine. There Nikolai Uspensky started to publish his new sketches of country life, featuring crooked vile peasants and noble, naive masters. Influenced by Kondratyev, Uspensky started a series of 'revelatory' memoirs about Lev Tolstoy, Nekrasov, Turgenev and Gleb Uspensky. For the leftist critics, this only went to justify their opinion of Uspensky being a has-been, and even the conservative journalists like Viktor Burenin warned their readership against taking those writings as anything remotely credible. Gleb Uspensky wrote a letter demanding to stop publishing these slanderous pieces, and after the proof emerged showing that Uspensky’s memoirs on Nekrasov were libelous, the series abruptly stopped. These publications were taken kindly to by the conservative press, and Uspensky was invited to Fyodor Berg's Russky Vestnik. There he published his Sketches from the Estate, praised for being 'true to the Orthodox tradition' by Konstantin Leontyev. All this served little to cheer up the author who was now described as "shabbily dressed, skinny and utterly depressed." In the autumn of 1889, Uspensky made his last trip to Stupino to see his beloved daughter, Olga, but the latter became so frightened as to refuse to come out.

=== Death ===
Shortly after his visit to Stupino, Uspensky returned to Moscow, where he committed suicide on 2 November (Old Style 21 October) 1889. The day before he reportedly had approached Ivan Kondratyev for a razor, and the latter said: "Want to kill yourself? A penknife would do." Uspensky indeed purchased a penknife and slit his own throat. According to one newspaper report, "On October 21, nearby one of the houses of the Smolensky market a body of a dead old man was found with two wounds to his throat... The body lay in two large pools of blood and a dull penknife was found nearby. In his pocket there was the passport of former teacher Nikolai Vasilyevich Uspensky." Eight kopecks found in his pocket were sent to his daughter Olga, her only inheritance. Not a single literary man was present at the funeral, and the only official there was Karl Knobloch, the Moscow college inspector who came to pay a tribute to Uspensky as a former teacher. The first obituary was published by Russkye Vedomosty where Uspensky was credited only as "the former teacher. " "How many of our readers have ever heard, let alone read this author?" asked Novosty (No. 295, 1889), and several issues later repeated the stereotypical opinion that this author "ridiculed peasants and his talent was evil and nasty..." The conservative press was more sympathetic, and on 29 October, in Grazhdanin Vladimir Meshchersky wrote: "The writer as we know belonged to the conservative camp, he was not the servant of the liberal muse and wasn't engaged in pouring out liberal/narodnik lamentations—that is why he died broke and hungry in the country where there is a Literary fund and in a huge city where there are numerous journals and newspapers."

== Critical reception ==
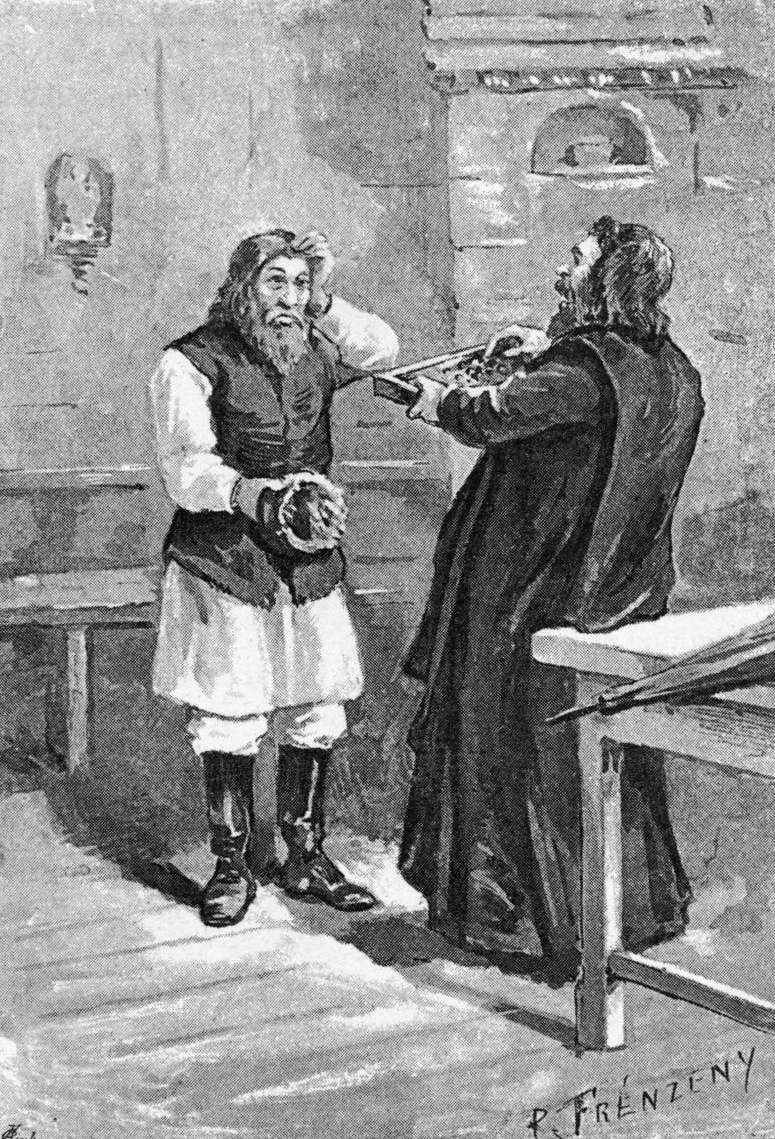
The peasant Yeremei and his master, from Uspensky's story Porridge

In 1861 the Stories by Nikolai Uspensky came out in two miniature volumes and caused an uproar. Critics were almost unanimous in their hostility, accusing the author of "spitting onto people's beliefs and ways of life" and seeing nothing but cold cynicism behind the humour. "He's got a sharp but aimless eye focusing on whatever comes across without obvious reason," wrote Stepan Dudyshkin in Otechestvennye Zapiski. "He picks up every possible detail, totally irrelevant, not even thinking about somehow linking it to the main action," agreed Fyodor Dostoyevsky, writing in Vremya. "The indifferent nature of humour is essential to Uspensky's gift," Pavel Annenkov remarked several years later. "Intellectual indifference", "lack of care" and "mental hibernation" were typical to the author's prose according to Evgeny Edelson (Biblioteka Dlya Chtenya). Critics from the left mostly agreed with their colleagues from the liberal camp. Vsevolod Krestovsky expressed amazement at how totally devoid of ideas Uspensky's prose was. "He is rather good photographer. But his also is cold, impassive attitude towards the world he photographs in his sketches... He's never able to discern a poor man's cry from a drunkard's scream," Krestovsky noted.

The only dissenting voice was that of Nikolai Chernyshevsky. In his essay Is This the Beginning of a Change? he hailed Uspensky's early stories as fresh evidence that the revolution in the Russian country was imminent. The critic attributed to Uspensky some views the latter never had, maintaining, for example, that the author denounced "darkness common people were plunged into" to highlight the reasons which were stopping people from rioting and "show the way progressive raznotchintsy should lead ignorant masses" towards their liberation. The very attitude of the author who, discarding all sympathy, scolded or ridiculed Russian men for the way they lived was, according to the critic, symptomatic of some radical change. In the new reality, he argued, the oppressed ones needed not sentimental sympathy (writers like Turgenev and Grigorovich provided in abundance) but some instigation for real action. Chernyshevsky's essay in a way opened a floodgate for a whole host of similar-minded authors: Sleptsov, Reshetnikov, Levitov, Gleb Uspensky, Pomyalovsky thus making Nikolay Uspensky a pioneer of the Raznochintsy movement in the Russian literature.

After Uspensky's departure from Sovremennik he was warmly welcomed by Otechestvennye Zapiski. This magazine's 1863 review maintained that the writer's new stories demonstrated the maturity and he was now approaching the ideal of 'pure artistry' never letting ideology prevail over form. Sovremennik's reply was quick and to the effect that Uspensky indeed has slid down towards the 'arts for arts sake' platform and for that very reason his newest work is worthless. Later scholars came to the conclusion that both sides were right to some extent. Objectively, Uspensky's new stories were inferior to his earlier ones. On the other hand, what Sovremennik did was totally re-evaluate his first stories too (calling their author "a scribbler with chicken worldview") which looked indeed like a betrayal—not of Uspensky but rather of Chernyshevsky and Dobrolyubov's ideas. This time Saltykov-Shchedrin (whose unsigned article was called "Ignorance and Greed Go Hand in Hand") emerged as Uspensky's opponent.

By mid-1870 Nikolai Uspensky was the thing of the past, as far as Russian literary community was concerned. He was referred to as "a forgotten writer" even by those (like Nikolai Mikhailovsky, in 1877) who made attempts to remind the reading public about him. He fell into oblivion that lasted almost half a century, not because of his artistic decline, Chukovsky insisted, but for the change of the general atmosphere in the Russian society and the rapid rise of Narodnitchestvo, a peasant's Socialism doctrine. For narodniks any criticism of a 'common man' was blasphemy. Alexander Skabichevsky, one of the prominent figures in narodnik movement, accused Uspensky in consciously putting Russian people to ridicule. In his History of Modern Russian literature he wrote of Uspensky: "In his stories common people are presented in an extraordinarily ugly way. Each man is either a thief or a drunkard or a fool that’s never lived on Earth, every woman is an unbelievable idiot ... Whatever Uspensky managed to see or hear he used to show how ignorant, uncultured, ridiculous, trodden over Russian man is and how deep he’s sunk into the mire of stupidity, superstition and vulgarity". Rejection and even hatred dogged Uspensky up until his death and continued afterwards, each new generation of critics repeating what had been said earlier, never attempting to re-evaluate his legacy. The only exception was Georgy Plekhanov who, in the late 1890s, criticizing narodniks, tried to show how unjust they were in treating Uspensky, but he never came to write a comprehensive essay on him as he did on Gleb Uspensky and some minor authors like Karonin and Naumov. It was only in the Soviet times that Nikolai Uspensky has been re-discovered, his major work re-issued.

== Legacy ==
Nikolai Uspenskys's immediate predecessor in the "simple people lives' tales" niche was Vladimir Dal. For a time being both critics and reading public saw the newcomer as Dal's follower. Otechstvennye Zapiski and Vedomosty in their early reviews described the author as "an obvious imitator of the well-known Dal stories." Soon Uspensky made Dal irrelevant, according to Chukovsky. Even more devastating was a blow he rendered to the whole school of 1840s–early 1850s literature which took a maudlin, sentimental attitude towards Russian peasant.

Nikolai Uspensky is credited with being the first prominent raznotchinets writer in the history of Russian literature, the one who, according to Fyodor Dostoyevsky, "having come in the wake of Ostrovsky, Turgenev, Pisemsky and Tolstoy" proved to be the first to "not just present another upper class view on common people, but express those people's viewpoint," and to "tell the truth about the life of Russian people without embellishments or flattery," according to Nikolai Chernyshevsky.

Radical critics of Sovremennik hailed Uspensky as a new force in Russian literature, "the most happy discovery with, of course, nothing happy to write about," as Chernyshevsky put it. Later literary historians agreed that Uspensky was the first writer from the Russian lower class who came up with stark and cruel pictures of rural life. Uspensky is regarded as a precursor for Anton Chekhov's country prose cycle and, to a greater extent, for Ivan Bunin, who spent some time in 1890 to gather facts about Uspensky's life for future biographers.

== English translations ==
- Porridge, and The Village Schoolmaster, (stories) from The Humor of Russia, Ethel Voynich/Stepnyak, Walter Scott Publishing, 1909. from Archive.org
