= The Witch (short story) =

- Short story by Anton Chekhov
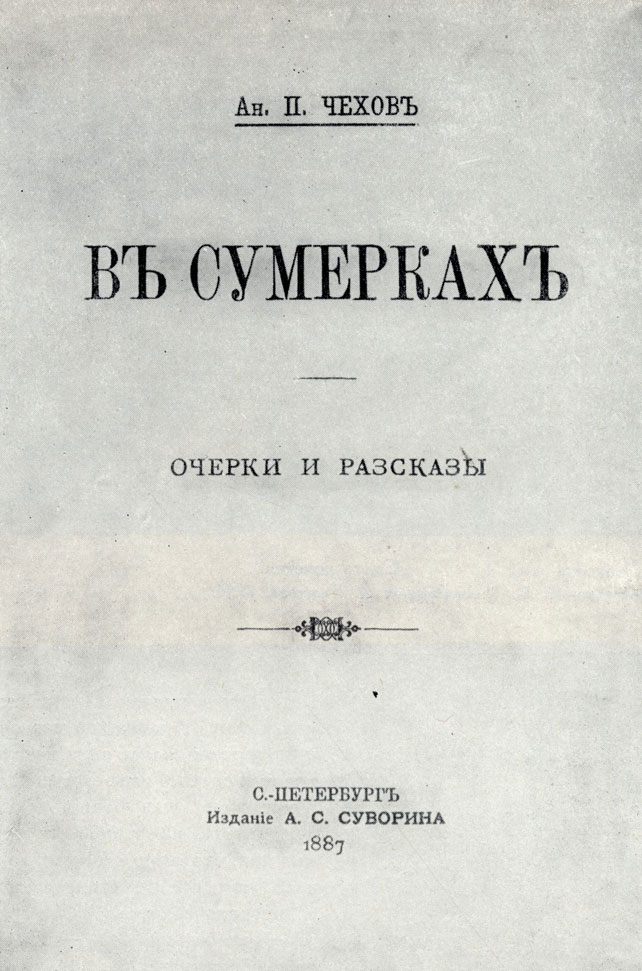
- 1887 In Twilight collection cover
- Original title: Ведьма
- Country: Russia
- Language: Russian

Publication
- Published in: Novoye Vremya
- Publication date: 8 March 1886

"The Witch" (Russian: Ведьма, romanized: Vedma) is an 1886 short story by Anton Chekhov.

== Background and publication ==
On the origins of the story, Chekhov's brother Mikhail wrote in his 1923 memoirs: "There was, [not far from Babkino], by the Daragan Forest, a lonely Polevshcinskaya church which had always intrigued [Chekhov]. They had the service in it only once a year, and in the night time one could hear its bell, marking the hours. It was this small church with its watchman's hut by the post road, that had given apparently Chekhov the ideas for his stories 'The Witch' and 'A Bad Business'." According to Chekhov's 28 March 1886 letter to Dmitry Grigorovich, he wrote "The Witch" in the course of one day.

"The Witch" was first published on 8 March 1886 by Novoye Vremya (Issue No. 3600). It made its way into the 1887 collection In the Twilight (В сумерках), to be reproduced, unchanged, in all its 13 editions (1888–1899). While revising the story for it, Chekhov omitted some details which many of his correspondents referred to as exceedingly naturalistic. He returned to the original version while preparing the text for the Volume 3 of his Collected Works, published by Adolf Marks in 1899–1901.

During its author's lifetime the story was translated into German and Czech languages.

== Plot summary ==
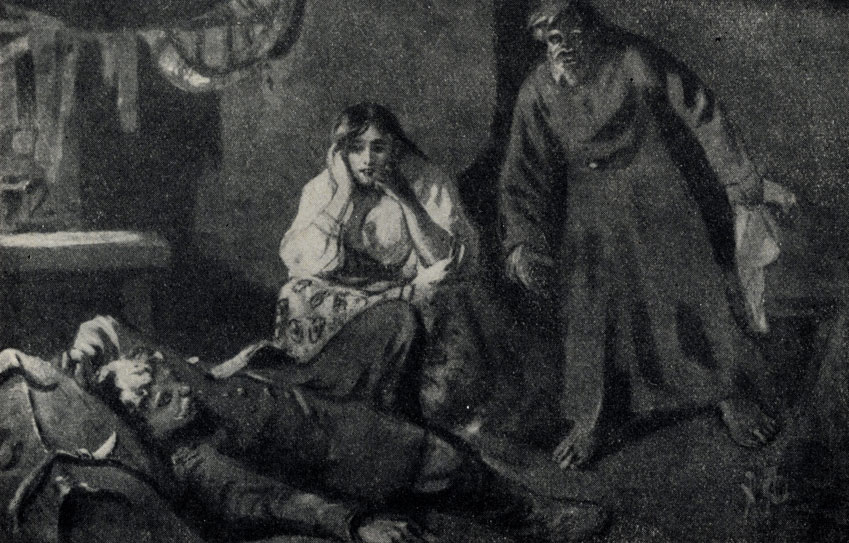
1902 illustration by Viktor Apsit

Nightfall approaches, and in the hut adjoining the church, the sexton Saveliy Gykin lies in his huge bed, listening to the snowstorm raging outside and muttering something threatening. His wife Raisa sits by the window, making sacks out of coarse hempen stuff, and its soon becomes clear that it's to her that his grunts are addressed.

Saveliy seems to seriously think that his wife is a witch, who intentionally brings about storms in order to lure the young men who'd lose their way into the house, to seduce them. Raisa tries to reason with him, saying that when her father was alive, "all sorts of people used to come to him to be cured of the ague," and nobody accused him of witchcraft, even if he was a healer. Saveliy points out that those coming to their hut looking for help are invariably young men, 'looking for mischief'.

A distant sound catches their attention. Soon the postman and his coachman enter the hut, and it turns out, they've lost their way. The postman is young and good-looking, and Raisa asks if the two would have some tea, then tells the guest that her late father was the sexton here, then before his death he hastily married her off to somebody from the Consistory, and now the two live here in sheer poverty, because Saveliy is lazy and is 'afraid of people'.

Exhausted, the postman drops off by his huge mail bag. Raisa sits and watches him, transfixed. Saveliy jumps off and puts a handkerchief over his face, allegedly "to keep the light out of his eyes," but apparently in order to block the gaze of his witch of a wife, to her great chagrin. Full of premonitions, he wakes up the two men, but while the coachman insists they have to hurry, the young postman reckons they've missed the mail train already, and is succumbing to the soft voice of Raisa, imploring him to stay and have some tea.

Finally the two decide they should go, and Saveliy is so relieved, he runs off to help the coach driver to drag the bags. Alone with Raisa, the young man touches her neck, then, encouraged by her hot whispering, embraces her by the waist, feeling great desire overcoming him. The two men return to the house, and the postman has to go.

Saveliy departs to show the way. Raisa starts to pace to and fro, getting more and more agitated, breathing heavily, her eyes full of hatred. She sees her humble, dirty, greasy abode with the new eyes, with contempt and disgust. Suddenly she realises she might have had a better life, had she not been married to this worthless, dirty man. She bursts into tears and cries her heart out.

Saveliy returns, now convinced that his wife, who is in league with the devil, can control the winds. Yet, unable now to resist her supernatural sexual power, he touches her plait, then her neck. She responds by giving him an elbow to the nose.

== Critical reception ==
"The Witch was discarded by many. So what? There is not much things around to write about, and the devil is always beside you, nudging you towards this sort of thing," Chekhov complained to his friend and regular correspondent Viktor Bilibin soon after the story appeared in Novoye Vremya. In his 14 March letter, Bilibin replied: "They say (notably, Leykin), Suvorin liked your The Witch immensely, was enraptured by it. I'd hesitate to say the same about myself. What I really enjoyed is its artfulness, for this is surely the work of a major talent. The pictures of nature are superb. But those excessively sensuous scenes... in the vein of the indecent pictures are hardly worth your talent's while."

Fyodor Schechtel, on the other hand, seemed to have been impressed exactly by these scenes. In his 12 March letter to Chekhov he opined that the naturalistic details in the sexton's portrait "would beat any by, say, Zola".

Dmitry Grigorovich praised the story, but was unhappy about its 'naturalistic' side. "Such things as veracity and realism do not necessarily negate gracefulness, in fact, they benefit from it. A superb master of the form, like yourself, who has such a great feeling for [phraseological] plasticity, has no particular need to inform the readers about the state of the sexton's unwashed feet with its hook-like nails, or his navel... Please excuse me for this, the reason I've let myself to express such opinions is that I truly believe in your gift and greatly wish it the best possible development and realisation," he remarked in his 25 March letter.

Maria Kiselyova (Note: Maria Vladimirovna Kiselyova (Russian: Мария Владимировна Киселёва, nee Begicheva, c.1859-1921, was a children's writer who contributed mostly to the magazines Children's Leisure and Rodnik. She was the wife of Alexey Sergeyevich Kiselyov, the owner of the Babkino estate nearby Voskresensk, where Chekhov and his family spent the summers of 1885, 1886 and 1887. Thirty-five Chekhov's letters to Kiselyova (1885-1897) are extant, and thirty-one of her letters, written in 1886-1900. - Commentaries to Chekhov's Correspondence) enjoyed "The Witch" and compared it favourably to another story, "Mire". "For me... the strongest point of 'The Witch' is its realism... The whole scenery, the heroine, her husband and their guests are portrayed in the most masterful fashion. While reading it I can blush a bit, but what I cannot do is say something in it does not ring true," she wrote Chekhov on 18 January 1887.

The story was reviewed as part of In Twilight collection and the results were mixed. The Peterburgskaya Gazeta's literary correspondent lauded the depictions of nature in the story, "much in the vein of Dickens at his best," adding: "Chekhov is most certainly a poet, writing in prose."

Alexander Skabichevsky reminded the readers of Severny Vestnik how Chekhov's debut short story collection Motley Stories had been criticised in it, for some of its entries having been half-baked. He argued that the predictions which were made then, that writing too hastily and mostly for newspapers would have dire consequences for this gifted author, have come true. "Take The Witch for example. Had it stayed for a week in its author's desk, and then would be revised with pencil in hand, we wouldn't cringe at these sexton's tirades, improbably serene and theatrical," he wrote.

"None of the young writers would surpass [Chekhov] for depicting so expressively and subtly, so poetically and yet laconically, both the nature and different types of human character," Viktor Burenin wrote in Novoye Vremya, speaking of "The Witch".

Platon Krasnov, writing for Trud, argued that in portraying woman's sensuality (in "Peasant Wives" and "The Witch") Chekhov was never slight or playful, having always had some social conflict in mind. Krasnov praised the language in The Witch and compared its pictures of nature to those in a Fyodor Tyutchev poem.

Lev Tolstoy included "The Witch" in his personal list of Chekhov's best stories.
