= Kurochkin =

Kurochkin (Russian: Курочкин) is a Russian masculine surname, its feminine counterpart is Kurochkina. It may refer to

- Evgeny Kurochkin (1940–2011), Russian paleornithologist
- Kirill Kurochkin (born 1988), Russian football player
- Nikolai Kurochkin (1830–1884), Russian poet, editor, translator and essayist
- Olesya Kurochkina (born 1983), Russian football striker
- Pavel Kurochkin (1900–1989), Soviet general
- Vasily Kurochkin (1831–1875), Russian satirical poet, journalist and translator
- Victoria Kurochkina (born 1992), Russian water polo player
- Vladimir Kurochkin (1829–1885), Russian dramatist, translator, editor and publisher

== See also ==
- Kurochkin Strait
