= Kazimir Barantsevich =

Russian writer and poet (1851–1927)

- Казимир Баранцевич
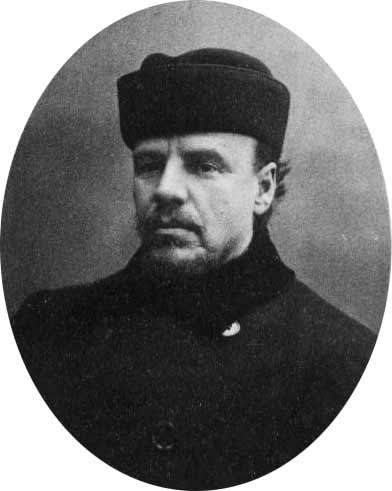
- Born: 22 May 1851; Saint Petersburg, Russia
- Died: 26 July 1927 (aged 76); Ulyanovka, Russian SFSR, Soviet Union
- Occupation: Writer

Kazimir Stanislavovich Barantsevich (Russian: Казимир Станиславович Баранцевич; 3 June [O.S. 22 May] 1851 – 26 July 1927) was a Russian writer and poet, who also used the pseudonym Sarmat.

== Biography ==
Barantsevich was born in Saint Petersburg to Stanislav Martynovich Barantsevich, a descendant of the Polish aristocratic family belonging to the order of Leliwa, and his French wife, Julia Ivanovna (née Lemann).

He debuted in 1873 with the drama in verse Oprichnina, a poetic remake of A.K. Tolstoy's Prince Serebryanny which was produced in October that year in Alexandrinsky Theatre.

In 1878, writing under the pseudonym Sarmat, he started to publish humorous sketches and short stories in the magazines Strekoza, Oskolki and newspapers (Russkiye Vedomosti, among others). More serious work by Barantsevich started to appear in journals like Severny Vestnik, Russky Vestnik, Nablyudatel and Otechestvennye Zapiski.

His first short story collection Pod gnyotom ('Oppressed') which the writer Nikolai Leykin had been instrumental in the publication of, came out in 1883 to considerable critical acclaim. It was followed by several more, including Porvannye struny ('Broken Strings', 1886), 80 Stories by Sarmat (1891) and Kartinki zhizni ('Life's Sketches', 1892), as well as three novels: Raba ('Woman Slave', 1887), Semeyny ochag ('Family Hearth', 1893), Bortsy ('Wrestlers', 1896).

The Works by K.S. Barantsevich in 9 volumes were published by the Marks Publishing House in 1908–1911. In his lifetime Barantsevich published more than one hundred books, only one of them, a one-act play Pod zemlyoi ('Underground', 1918), after 1917. He died in Ulyanovka (formerly Sablino) in Leningrad Governorate, in 1927, and is interred in Volkovo Cemetery in Saint Petersburg.

== Legacy ==
Barantsevich's novels, highlighting the life of people from Russian lower middle classes, leading unspeakably dreary, aimless and lonesome existence on the outskirts of Saint Petersburg, earned him the reputation of the leading purveyor of 'social pessimism' in the Russian literature of the late 19th century. Nikolai Mikhaylovsky, though, praised Barantsevich as a true master for depicting human loneliness, quite able to "rise to the peaks of true art." Anton Chekhov considered his worldview 'limited' but still, in 1900 suggested him as a candidate for the Honourable Academics.
