= Gavriil Zhulev =

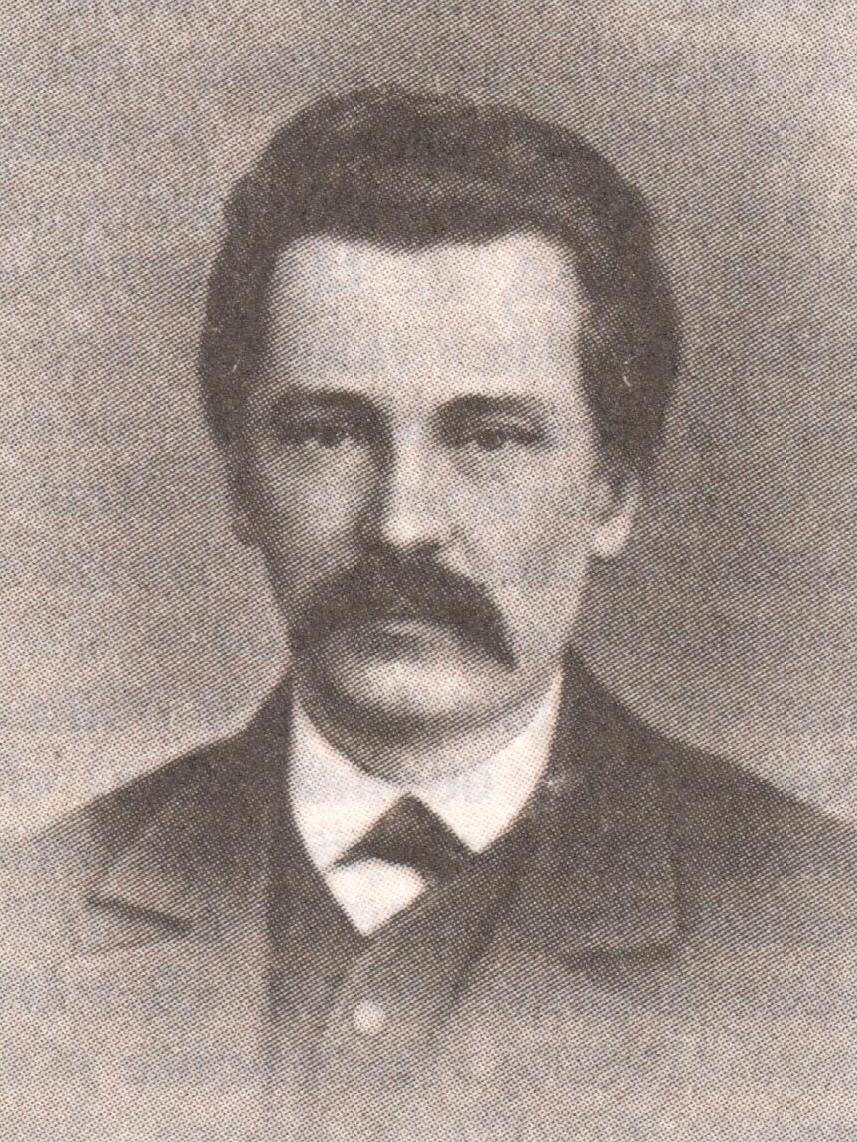
- Born: Gavriil Nikolayevich Zhulev; Гавриил Николаевич Жулев; 5 July 1836; Spasskoye, Bronnitsky Uyezd, Moscow Governorate, Russian Empire
- Died: 12 July 1878 (aged 42); Saint Petersburg, Russian Empire
- Occupations: poet, playwright

Gavriil Nikolayevich Zhulev (Russian: Гаврии́л Никола́евич Жулёв, 5 July 1836, Spasskoye, Bronnitsky Uyezd, Moscow Governorate, — 12 July 1878, Saint Petersburg, Russian Empire) was a Russian satirical poet, dramatist and actor.

== Biography ==
A St Petersburg Theatre college alumnus, Zhulev started out as a professional actor and joined the Alexandrinka troupe (where his sister Yekaterina Zhuleva was by this time a well-known actress) in 1853 which he stayed with until 1875. Invited to Iskra by Nikolai Kurochkin, Zhulev debuted as a published author in 1860 and became a regular and prolific contributor to this magazine, as well as Budilnik, Peterburgskaya Gazeta, Peterburgsky Listok and Strekoza (in which he edited the poetry section), using the pen names Skorbny Poet (Mournful Poet), Debutante, and Gus (Goose). Zhulev released two collections of poetry, which he compiled himself, Pesni Skorbnogo poeta (Songs of the Mournful Poet, 1863) and Bah! Znakomuye vse litsa! (Bah! All Familiar Faces, 1871), the former was favourably (albeit very briefly) reviewed by Saltykov-Shchedrin. "The Poverty, which merrily mocks itself and laughs whole-heartedly at the rich man's obnoxiousness... is Mournful Poet's major motif," the Iskra preface read. Zhulev co-authored a dozen plays, with Ivan Chernyshov, Alexander Sokolov, Nikolai Leykin and Sergey Khudekov. Mostly vaudevilles, they were produced on stage, enjoyed some success but were ignored by critics.
