= The Huntsman (short story) =

- Short story by Anton Chekhov
- 1954 illustration by Kukryniksy
- Original title: Егерь
- Translator: Constance Garnett
- Country: Russia
- Language: Russian

Publication
- Published in: Peterburgskaya Gazeta
- Publication date: 1 August 1885

"The Huntsman" (Russian: Егерь, romanized: Yeger) is an 1885 short story by Anton Chekhov.

== Publication ==
The story was first published on 1 August (o.s. 18 July) 1885 in Peterburgskaya Gazeta (Issue No. 194), signed A. Chekhonte (А. Чехонте). It featured in all the 14 editions of Chekhov's 1886 collection Motley Stories (Пёстрые рассказы), first published in Saint Petersburg in 1886, and was included by the author into Volume 3 of the original edition of the Collected Works by A.P. Chekhov, published by Adolf Marks in 1899–1901.

== History ==
"The Huntsman" made a strong impression upon Dmitry Grigorovich, who in a 25 March 1886 letter expressed his delight and urged Chekhov to leave the humorous genre behind and concentrate on more serious issues. In his 28 March reply Chekhov admitted that up until then he'd never taken his literary exercises seriously. "I cannot recall one single story that would have taken me more than one day to write, and 'The Huntsman' that you've liked so much, had been written actually, in a bath!"

Not only was Grigorovich infatuated with the story, he made sure it would in a way improve its author's career prospects. Alexander Lazarev-Gruzinsky (Note: Alexander Semyonovich Lazarev (1861-1927), who used the pen name Gruzinsky (The Georgian), was Chekhov's friend and protégé who in 1880s contributed stories and verses to Oskolki, Budilnik, Razvlecheniye and Strekoza. Chekhov edited his stories, advised him on style, but the two books of stories authored by Gruzinsky (in 1891 and 1911) were mediocre and had no success. He is best remembered for his assorted memoirs on Chekhov in which he remembered with great warmth and gratitude his young mentor who’d put so much effort into a literary talent that failed to develop. –) in his memoirs quoted Chekhov as once having told him: "Apparently, right after my 'Huntsman' had appeared in 'St Petersburg Gazette', Grigorovich visited Suvorin and said: 'Alexey Sergeyevich, please do invite Chekhov to Novoye Vremya. Just you read his 'Huntsman'. It would be a crime for you not to get this man!' Suvorin contacted Kurepin, (Note: Alexander Dmitriyevich Kurepin, 1847-1891, was a Moscow journalist, the editor of Budilnik in the early 1880s, who later joined Suvorin's Novoye Vremya. -) from whom I received an invitation by letter, to join Novoye Vremya!"

== Plot summary ==
Yegor the huntsman, walking down a country road accidentally meets his estranged wife Pelageya to whom he's been married for twelve years but visited just several times, and even then, drunk and violent. She weeps and, fawning before him, implores him to visit her more often. He tries to explain why he, the best sportsman around, 'a pampered man', enjoying good tea and 'refined conversation', could not bear to live in a village.
