= Birzhevyie Vedomosti (1861–1880) =

Newspaper (1880–1917)

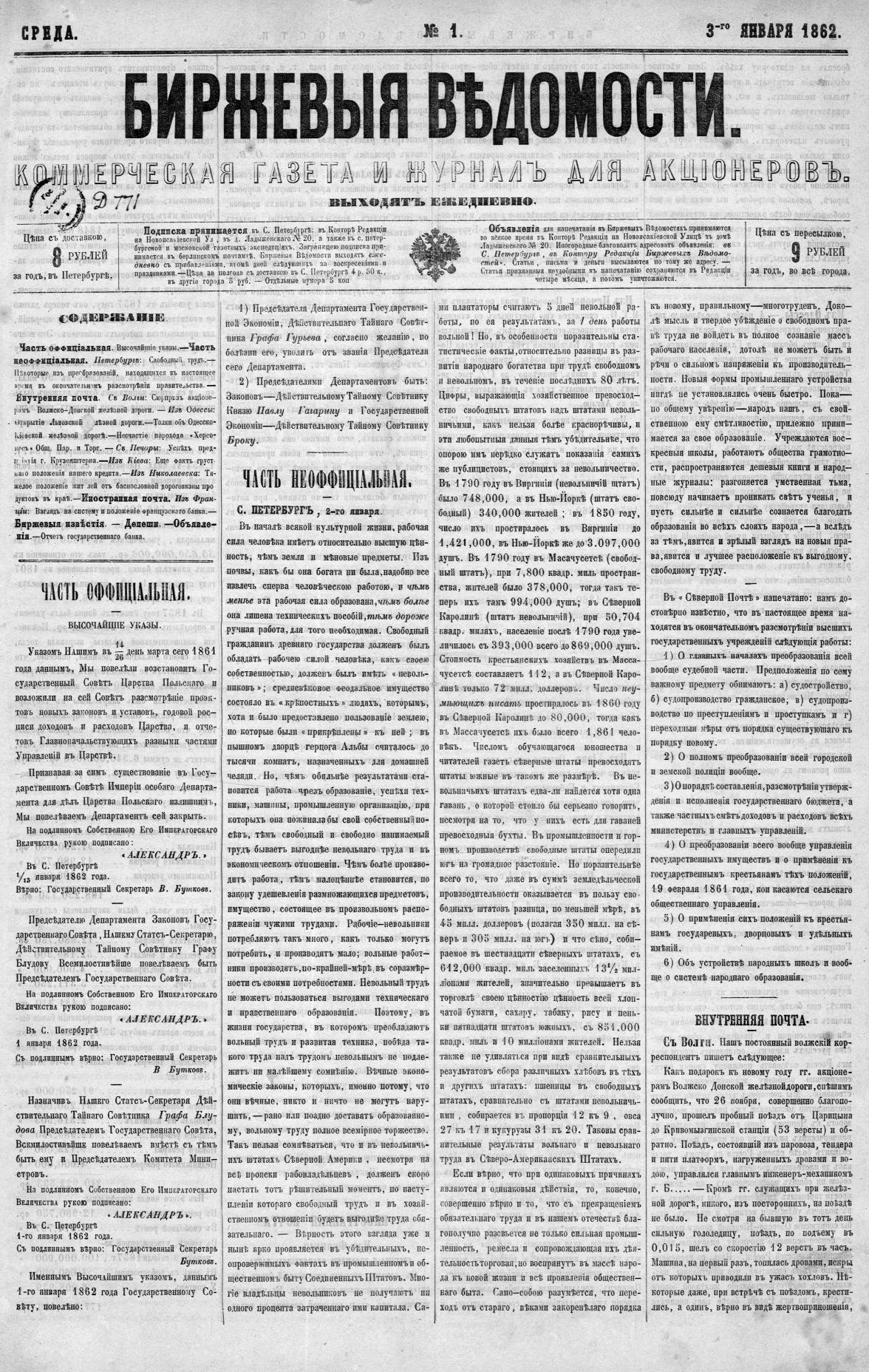
- 1862, no. 1
- Type: Daily newspaper
- Owner(s): Konstantin Trubnikov, Vasily Poletika
- Editor: Konstantin Trubnikov, Vasily Poletika, Evgeny Karnovich
- Founded: 1861
- Ceased publication: 1880
- Political alignment: center left
- Headquarters: Saint Petersburg, Russian Empire

Birzhevyie Vedomosti (Russian: Биржевы́е ве́домости/Биржевыя Вѣдомости, lit. 'Stock Exchange News') was a Russian political, economical and literary newspaper, published in Saint Petersburg in 1861–1879. It was based in the Suneyeva House, at Konnogvardeyski Boulevard, 11.

It was founded by the businessman, financier and journalist Konstantin Trubnikov after the merger of two minor publications, Commerce Gazette and Auctioneers' Journal. He was also its original publisher and editor-in-chief. In 1862 Birzheviye Vedomosti became the official organ of the tax-collecting department of the Imperial Russian government. In 1864 it started to come out six times a week. It had one popular supplement, Vechernyaya Gazeta (The Evening Gazette) (1865–1878) and numerous literary and scientific ones.

In March 1874 the businessman Vasily Poletika became the co-owner and co-editor of the newspaper, which was also joined in October of that year by Evgeny Karnovich, its new editor-in-chief. In 1875 Poletika acquired all the publishing rights and Birzheiye Vedomosti made a quick transition into an organ of the left opposition. Among its active contributors were brothers Nikolai and Vasily Kurochkins, Nikolai Mikhaylovsky, Alexey Pleshcheyev, Alexander Skabichevsky. Maria Trubnikova, who was married to Trubnikov, also worked at the paper as a translator and editor. It received several warnings from the authorities and was temporarily suspended twice. In 1879 it changed its title into Molva (Rumour) but was closed in 1880.
