= Peterburgsky Vestnik =

- Editor: Leo Kambek
- Frequency: Weekly
- Founded: 1861
- Final issue: 1862
- Based in: Saint Petersburg, Russian Empire
- Language: Russian

Peterburgsky Vestnik (Russian: Петербургский вестник, Petersburg Herald) was a Russian weekly political and literary magazine published in Saint Petersburg in 1861-1962. Its predecessor was Semeyny Krug (Family Circle), edited by A. Stanyukovich in 1858-1860, which in 1861 changed both the publisher and the title. In all, 42 issues of Peterburgsky Vestnik came out.

A liberal publication which supported the 1861 land reform, the magazine had several supplements, containing both the official documents, aiming to regulate the new social relationships in the Russian village, and the staff's commentaries, more often than not unflattering. Still, the radicals considered such criticism on the part of liberals as equally damaging to the cause of Russian peasantry, and Peterburgsky Vestnik has been subjected to severe scolding, particularly by Iskra. Among the authors who contributed to the magazine regularly, were Lev Lambek (its editor-in-chief), Ivan Kushneryov, Nikolai Leykin, Alexey Ivanov-Classic, Lev Mey.
