= Strekoza =

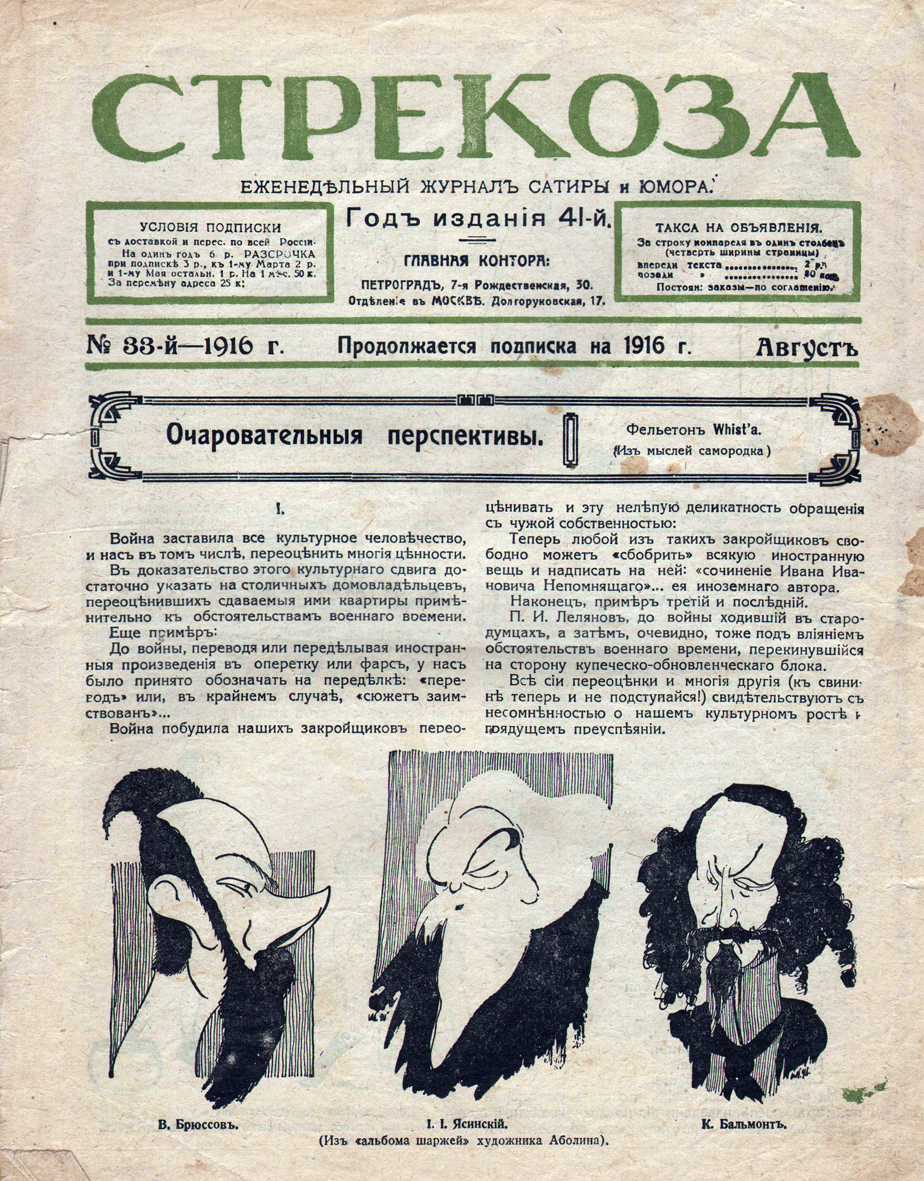
- August 1916 issue, featuring the caricatures on Bryusov, Yasinsky and Balmont
- Editor-in-chief: Nikolai Bogdanov (1875-1879); Ippolit Vasilevsky (1879-1905)
- Categories: Satirical magazine
- Frequency: Weekly
- Founded: 1875
- Final issue: 1908
- Based in: Saint Petersburg
- Language: Russian

Strekoza (Russian: Стрекоза, lit. ''Dragonfly'') was a Russian weekly magazine of humour and satire established in Saint Petersburg in 1875 by the publisher German Kornfeld. Its original editor-in-chief was Nikolai Bogdanov who left in 1879 to be succeeded by Ippolit Vasilevsky (1879-1905). In its heyday its circulation peaked at 9 thousand.

Initially seen by many as a successor to the leading Russian satirical magazine Iskra which had been closed in 1873, Strekoza attracted many authors, associated with its radical predecessor, including Pyotr Bykov, Gavriil Zhulev, Nikolai Leykin, Aleksey Pleshcheyev, Pyotr Sergeyenko and Liodor Palmin. Still, the political climate in Russia by this time had changed, and the magazine adopted a centrist, liberal stance, choosing not to conflict with authorities, even if Vasilevsky, its most active contributor, rarely missed an opportunity to fence with his conservative opponents, notably Mikhail Katkov and Prince Meshchersky.

Among the authors whose work occasionally appeared in Strekoza, were Nikolai Leskov, Yakov Polonsky, Dmitry Grigorovich and Viktor Bilibin. It was in Strekoza that in 1879 (No. 51 issue) Anton Chekhov debuted with a piece called "The Mayor's Archeological Report" (Археологический рапорт городничего), followed in March 1880 (No.10 issue) by "The Don Landowner's Stepan Vladimirovich's Letter to His Learned Neighbor Dr. Friedrich" (better known under its shortened title "A Letter to a Learned Neighbor"). In all, ten Chekhov's stories appeared here in 1880, then two more in 1883-1884.

In 1908 Strekoza folded. It was re-launched in 1915 by the publisher Isaak Bogelman, and lasted until 1918.
