= Sergeant Prishibeyev =

Short story by Anton Chekhov

- Short story by Anton Chekhov
- Illustration by Kukryniksy
- Original title: Унтер Пришибеев
- Country: Russia
- Language: Russian

Publication
- Published in: Peterbugskaya Gazeta
- Publication date: 5 (old style) October 1885

"Sergeant Prishibeyev" (Russian: Унтер Пришибеев, romanized: Unter Prishibeyev) is an 1885 short story by Anton Chekhov.

== Publication ==
The story was first published in the 18 (5 o.s.) October 1885, No. 273 issue of Peterburgskaya Gazeta originally under the title "Muckrake" (Кляузник), and signed A. Chekhonte (А. Чехонте). Under the new title it was included by Chekhov into Volume 2 of his Collected Works published in 1899–1901 by Adolf Marks.

== Background ==
Sergeant Prishibeyev was written originally for the Oskolki magazine, but its editor Nikolai Leykin found it 'too dry' and 'overdrawn'. Leykin prepared his own, abridged version of the story, but even that one was rejected by the censor Svyatkovsky. Following Leykin's advice, Chekhov sent it to the St Petersburg Gazette where it had no problems with censorship and was published as "Muckrake".

== Synopsis ==
Sergeant Prishibeyev (Note: A 'speaking surname', typical to the early Chekhov stories and the 19th century Russian satirical literature as a whole. Prishibeyev comes from the verb prishibit (пришибить), meaning "to crash down, strike dead".) gets himself into trouble with the police, due to his old army habit of restoring what he perceives as 'order', wherever he happens to be.
