= Mikhail Stopanovsky =

Russian writer

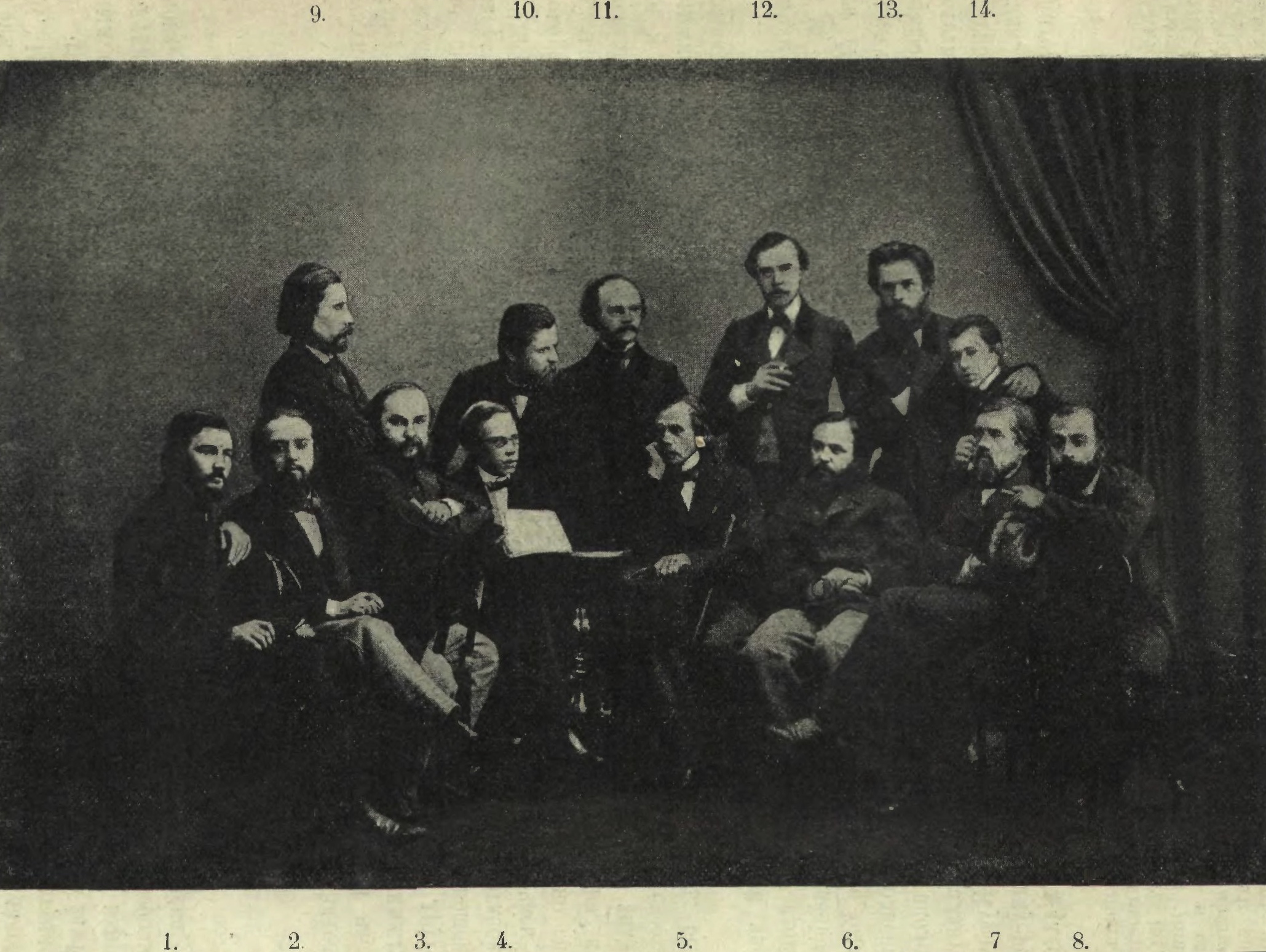
- Stopanovsky - left
- Born: Михаил Михайлович Стопановский; 1830; Ekaterinoslav, Russian Empire
- Died: 27 (o.s. 14) March 1877; Saint Petersburg, Russian Empire
- Occupations: writer, journalist

Mikhail Mikhaylovich Stopanovsky (Russian: Михаил Михайлович Стопановский, born 1830 in Ekaterinoslav, Imperial Russia, — died 27 (old style: 15) March 1877, Saint Petersburg, Imperial Russia) was a Russian writer, journalist and publicist. He started out in Iskra, which he soon became part of the stuff of and took upon himself the quite popular Life in Province section, then became a regular contributor to Budilnik. He is best known for his novel Oblichiteli (Обличители, The Accusers) first published by Otechestvennye Zapiski in 1862 (Issues 1—4, 6—8). Stopanovsky's other works of note include the novels Zapiski Skupovo (Записки скупого, The Notes of a Miser, 1857) and Zateryannye Lyudi (Затерянные люди, The Lost People, 1860).
