= Vek (magazine) =

Weekly magazine

- Editor: Pyotr Weinberg; Grigory Eliseev
- Frequency: Weekly
- First issue: 1861
- Final issue: 1862
- Based in: Saint Petersburg, Russian Empire
- Language: Russian

Vek (Russian: Век, Century) was a Russian weekly magazine which was published in Saint Petersburg from January 1861 until May 1862.

== History ==
Vek's first editor was Pyotr Weinberg. Alexander Druzhinin was the head of a literature department, while Konstantin Kavelin and Vladimir Bezobrazov supervised the law and economy sections, respectively. There was a strong group of regular contributors to Vek: Ivan Turgenev, Nikolai Nekrasov, Aleksey Pleshcheyev, Nikolai Leskov, Nikolai Uspensky, Mikhail Mikhaylov, and Pyotr Boborykin among them. In August 1861 Weinberg's satire aimed at some literary charity in Perm, involving a local activist Tolmachyova, outraged Russian feminists and in December he quit his post, making Grigory Yeliseyev his successor.

Vek's political agenda was eclectic. The journal's publicist section bore a strong narodnik influence: Yeliseyev, Afanasy Shchapov, and Nikolai Shelgunov promoted the idea of Russia's own, non-capitalist way of development, based on historical tradition of collectivism. Vek strongly supported the idea of common people's active participation in affairs of the state, demanding more social and political freedoms.

Writers belonging to the radical left, who contributed also to Sovremennik and Iskra, also found their tribune in Vek. Some, like Nikolai Serno-Solovyevich were active members of underground political circles. Eventually the conflict between factions came to a head and on March 27, 1862, Serno-Solovyevich, Alexander Engelgardt, Nikolai Shelgunov, and several other members quit the magazine. On April 29 the last, 17th issue came out and Vek closed for good due to the lack of finances.
