= Peterburgskaya Gazeta =

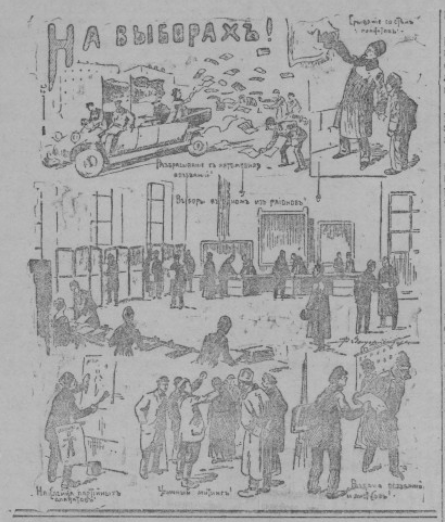
- 1917 elections in Petrogradskaya Gazeta
- Type: Daily newspaper
- Owner(s): Ilya Arsenyev
- Publisher: Ilya Arsenyev (1867–1871); Sergey Khudekov (1871–1893)
- Editor: Pyotr Monteverde (1881—1887); August Germonicus (1887—1893)
- Founded: 1867
- Political alignment: Liberal
- Ceased publication: 1917
- Headquarters: Saint Petersburg, Russian Empire

Peterburgskaya Gazeta (Russian: Петербургская Газета, IPA: [pʲɪtʲɪrˈburkskəjə ɡɐˈzʲetə]; "St. Petersburg Gazette") was a Russian political and literary newspaper, launched in 1867 by the publisher Ilya Arsenyev (1820–1888).

Originally a small-scale publication (coming out three times a week), it was bought in 1871 by Sergey Khudekov, started to gain momentum and in 1882 become a popular daily. Among the authors who contributed to it on the regular basis, were Nikolai Leskov, Alexander Kugel, Sergey Terpigorev, Vasily Avseenko, Ieronim Yasinsky, Nikolai Leykin, Dmitry Minayev, Gavriil Zhulev. In all, 33 short stories by Anton Chekhov were published by the St. Petersburg Gazette in 1885–1887, including "The Huntsman", "A Malefactor" and "Sergeant Prishibeyev".

In March 1917 Peterburgskaya Gazeta started to strongly support the Russian Provisional Government, calling for the anti-Bolshevik dictatorship. On 22 November of that year it was closed by the Bolshevist government.
