= Birzhevyie Vedomosti =

Birzhevyie Vedomosti may refer to two unrelated Russian publications:

- Birzhevyie Vedomosti (1861-1880)
- Birzhevyie Vedomosti (1880-1917)
