= Alexander Skabichevsky =

Russian literary historian and critic

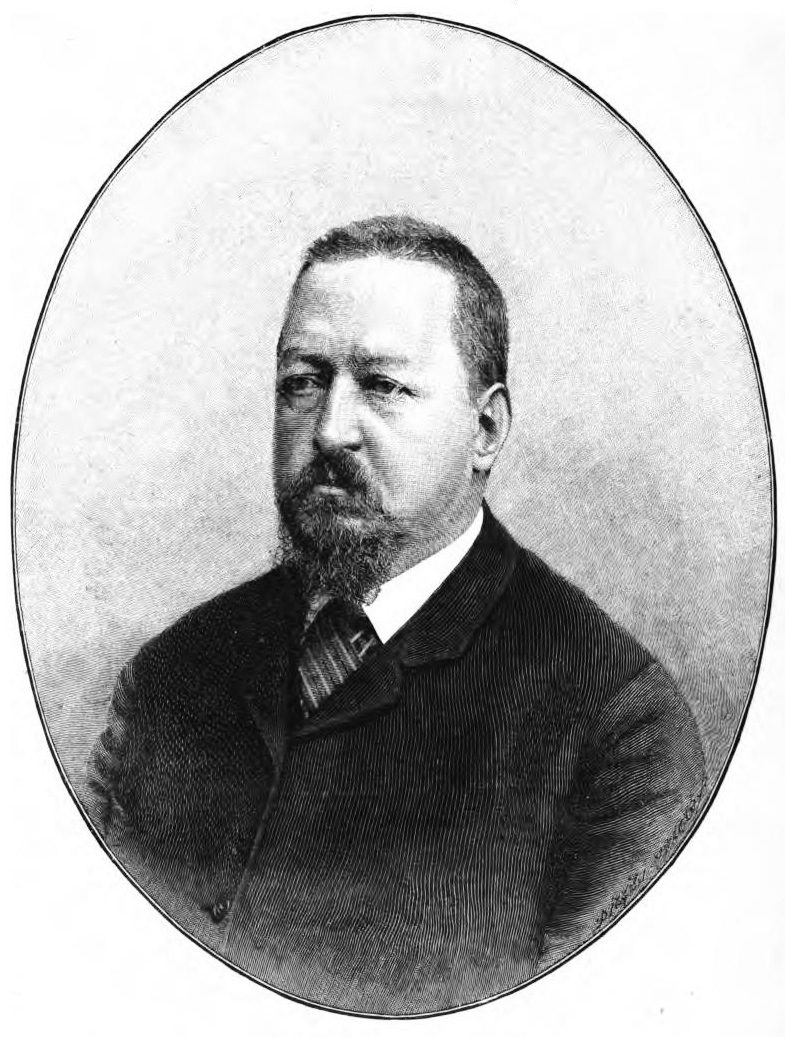
- Skabichevsky in 1895
- Born: September 27, 1838; Saint Petersburg, Russian Empire
- Died: January 11, 1911 (aged 72); Saint Petersburg, Russian Empire
- Occupations: literary historian, critic, memoirist
- Writing career
- Years active: 1859-early 1900s

Signature
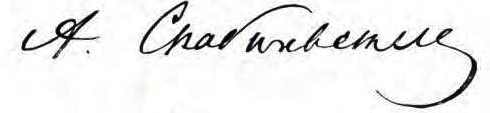

Alexander Mikhailovich Skabichevsky (Russian: Алекса́ндр Миха́йлович Скабиче́вский, September 27 (o.s., 15), 1838, Saint Petersburg, Russian Empire – January 11, 1911, o.s., December 29, 1910) was a Russian literary historian, critic and memoirist, part of the Narodnik movement, best known for his series of biographies of the 19th century Russian writers.

== Biography ==
Skabichevsky was born in Saint Petersburg into the family of a minor state official, the descendant of an old noble Ruthenian family. He studied first at the Larin gymnasium, then (in 1856–1861) at the Saint Petersburg University. After graduation, Skabichevsky went to work for a short while at the office of Saint Petersburg governor Prince Suvorov. 1864 saw him editing the stock market bulletin in Yaroslavl. For several years he worked as a teacher in different schools, including the Larin gymnasium.

=== Career ===
Skabichevsky debuted as a published author in 1859 with an article called "The Hunter's Notes", in Rassvet (The Dawn), a magazine for young ladies. In 1862 Otechestvennye zapiski published his drama Kruglitskye. In 1866 Nikolai Nekrasov invited Skabichevsky to Sovremennik, but the magazine was closed later that year following the attempt on Alexander II's life. Skabichevsky moved to Otechestvennye zapiski where he became one of the major proponent of the Narodnik doctrine; many saw him as its co-creator, alongside Nikolai Mikhailovsky. Unlike the latter, though, Skabichevsky was more of a literary critic and scholar than a publicist and sociologist. His major sociology study, "Notes on Progressive Ideas in Our Society" (1870–1872) was, in effect, a philological treatise.

Skabichevsky wrote several major literary biographies, notably those of Alexander Pushkin (1891), Mikhail Lermontov (1891), Alexander Griboyedov (1893), Nikolai Dobrolyubov (1894) and Aleksey Pisemsky (1894), all of which became part of the Florenty Pavlenkov-founded Lives of Distinguished People series. His History of Modern Russian Literature (1848-1890) was published in 1890 and reissued six times during its author's lifetime. The book has been credited with making the history of Russian literature the case for academic study for the first time, even if some of its ideological aspects caused controversy and evoke criticism, notably by Georgi Plekhanov, in 1897.

Highly regarded by specialists was Skabichevsky's work Notes on the Censorship in Russia: 1700-1763. His article "Sick Heroes of the Sick Literature", in which characters of old such as Onegin, Chatsky, and Pechorin were compared favorably to the "nonentities" of Fyodor Sologub, Alexander Kuprin and Anton Chekhov, also made a stir. Skabichevsky's numerous memoirs (invariably ending with 1884, a year he considered fatal for himself due to the closing of Otechestvennye zapiski, after which his career started to decline) were of much interest to literary historians, as they featured vivid portraits of Nikolai Nekrasov, Grigory Eliseev, Vasily Sleptsov, Fyodor Reshetnikov, the brothers Vasily, Vladimir and Nikolai Kurochkins, among many others. Despite having left behind him a great collection of high quality works, Skabichevsky died in poverty and oblivion, a bitterly disillusioned man.

== Views on literature ==
Literature was seen as a moral force by Skabichevsky and his fellow Narodniks. Skabichevsky, however, rejected radical realism, claiming that the purpose of art isn't the reproduction of external reality, but rather to reflect the world as it appears to us subjectively. He also criticized the idea of "types" in literature; he thought that the logic of types led to abstract generalizations that obscured the true color and variety of life.

Skabichevsky theorized that there was a pattern in European thought of movements going through two phases: the abstract or philosophical phase and the practical one. He saw the literature of the 1860s as the abstract phase of Russian literature, while the populism that followed represented the practical phase. He often clashed with the early Russian symbolists, but he saw them as part of the practical phase as well. He felt that some of Ivan Turgenev's stories showed more of an affinity with symbolism than realism, while he had a negative view of the works of Fyodor Tyutchev, generally considered as a forerunner of symbolism. Skabichevsky found the descriptions of war experiences in Leo Tolstoy's War and Peace to be over-simplified, and held a negative view of some of Anton Chekhov's early works.

Skabichevsky could sometimes lash out severely. He once wrote an article on The Adolescent by Fyodor Dostoevsky and judged that the author "as an artist and novelist was very negligent and sometimes demonstrated an amazing lack of talent."
