= Nikolai Stepanov =

Russian artist

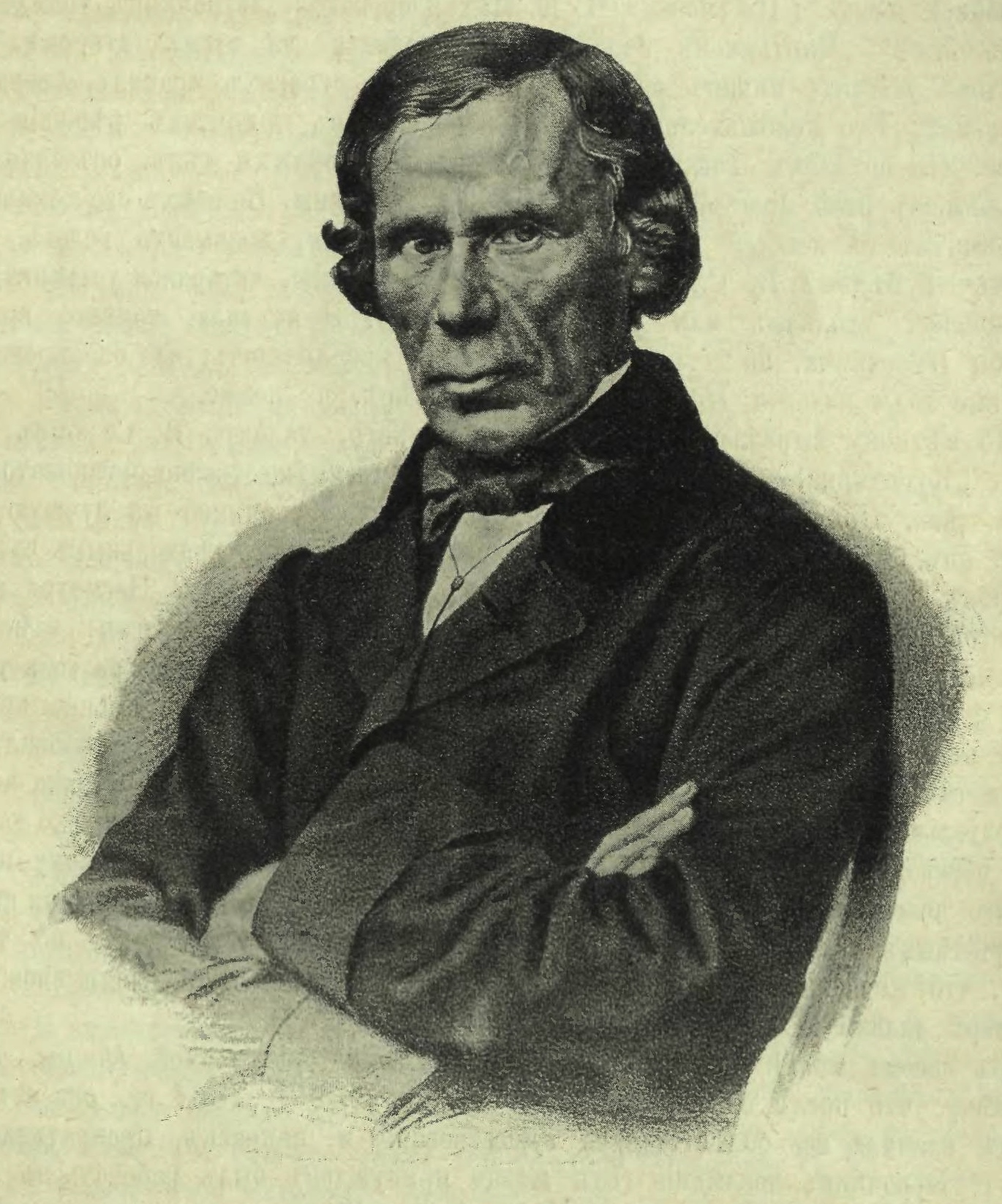
- Born: Николай Александрович Степанов; 3 May 1807; Kaluga, Russian Empire
- Died: 5 December 1877 (aged 70); Moscow, Russian Empire
- Occupations: artist, caricaturist, editor
- Years active: 1840s–1876
- Relatives: Pyotr Alexandrovich Stepanov (elder brother); Alexander Dargomyzhsky (brother-in-law); Klavdy Stepanov (nephew)

Nikolai Alexandrovich Stepanov (Russian: Николай Александрович Степанов, 3 May 1807, Kaluga, Russian Empire, – 5 December 1877, Moscow, Russian Empire) was a Russian draughtsman, active mainly in St. Petersburg during Tsars Nicholas I and Alexander II’s reigns, best known for his satirical cartoons. Pyotr Alexandrovich Stepanov, an Imperial Army general who served during the said reigns, was his elder brother.

In the 1840s Stepanov contributed to Syn Otechestva, Illustrirovanny Almanac and Music Album (which he edited in 1849 with Alexander Dargomyzhsky, his brother-in-law), in 1855–1856 he published several albums of caricatures. In 1859 along with Vasily Kurochkin Stepanov co-founded and co-edited the satirical journal Iskra to which he contributed more than 1600 sketches and caricatures. After this publication's closure Stepanov founded Budilnik (Alarm clock) magazine.

== History ==
The visual arts in Russia are rooted in lubok but this begins to change in the reign of Peter the Great that is an "alternate" tradition of social and political caricature. Artists from western Europe contribute to this cultural shift by teaching at the Imperial Academy of Arts in Saint Petersburg. The Academy's charter is revised by Catherine the Great and again in 1840 by Nicholas I. Nicholas assumes power in 1825 establishing new censorship committees after the Decembrist revolt that same year. During this time it becomes prohibited for artists or writers to mention political officials by name or to represent political views in their work. Censorship continues to expand in the upcoming decades. In 1840 the royal family is given control of the Academy and in 1848 the Buturlin Committee is formed in response to the Revolutions of 1848. Private art schools continue to operate in this era but artist's are for practical purposes dependent on state and imperial support for a living. After 1851 the lubok folk art must be destroyed and new works to carry the censor's seal but unauthorized works were still made until the second half of the 19th century. These uncensored lubki depicted the religious, literary and other themes and motifs of folklore common for this art form.

The political developments between 1857 and 1863 are complex. Russia has just been defeated in the Crimean War and there is public dialogue about the abolition of serfdom that is realized in 1861. Stepanov is involved during this period becoming one of the most influential of Russian artists as a new style of satire. When the periodical Hotchpotch he contributes to is shut down in 1869 he continues as editor of Spark that he co-founded with poet Kurochkin. The successor of Spark is Alarm Clock that is shut down in 1873. Stepanov's work Do you Feel any Freer Now? is censored for visual representation of a peasant who looks like Alexander II being led along on a rope by a landowner. Another of his caricature works showed editors waiting outside the censor's office on line forced to defend their works.
