= Liodor Palmin =

Russian poet, translator and journalist

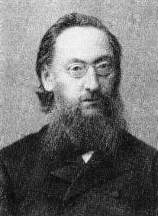
- Born: 27 May 1841; Yaroslavl, Russian Empire
- Died: 26 October 1891 (aged 50); Moscow, Russian Empire
- Writing career
- Genres: poetry, translations

Liodor (Iliodor) Ivanovich Palmin (Russian: Лиодо́р (Илиодор) Ива́нович Па́льмин; May 27 (May 15), 1841 in Yaroslavskaya gubernia, Russian Empire – November 7 (October 26), 1891 in Moscow, Russian Empire) was a Russian poet, translator and journalist.

== Biography ==
Liodor Palmin was born in 1841 in Yaroslavl region and became interested in literature through his father, a retired officer, himself a published poet who was close to the circle of Alexander Voeykov. It was Palmin Senior who's imbued his son with the love to the twin tradition of romantically rhetorical ode and 'rational', polite satire, prevalent at the time in the Russian poetry. Palmin's childhood impressions, concerning literature as a kind of high priesthood for an enlightened modern man, that Palmin has carried all through his life. In 1856, after his father's death, Liodor Palmin enrolled into the 3rd Saint Petersburgh gymnasium and, upon the graduation, joined the law faculty of the Saint Petersburgh University. In 1861 he got involved in students troubles, was arrested and got incarcerated into the Petropavlovskaya fortress – this harrowing experience caused him much anguish which resulted in memoirs, The Fortress.

After the liberation Palmin was expelled from the University, failed to find himself a regular job (as an address expedition) and settled as a free-lance journalist. Palmin debuted in 1858 as a translator from French in A.O.Ishimova's girl magazine Lutchi (Rays). In 1860-1862 he published poems in magazines Vek (edited by Pyotr Weinberg) and Biblioteka Dlya Chtenya (edited by Aleksey Pisemsky); in the mid-1860s he was actively contributing to publications associated with the literary left (Budilnik, Delo, Zhenski Vestnik). In 1863-1868 he became friends with Vladimir Kurochkin and started to contribute regularly to Iskra magazine which he later regarded his aesthetic and ideological alma mater. All the while Palmin thought real poetry's social meaning had no bearing upon whatever political hue and particular magazine was being marked by. This made it possible for him to publish his work in the satirical journal Zanoza (Splinter), edited by Mikhail Rosenheim, and Literaturnaya Biblioteka (edited by Yuri Bogushevich). Later in the 1870s and 1880s, he was published in virtually every paper available, including tabloids like Moskovski Listok somehow without losing his political integrity of as mild and generic political satirist, ridiculing "circus, markets and kharchevnyas", maintaining sacred nature of high literature (The Sacked Temple, 1877).

The 1880s saw the quick decline of Palmin: disillusioned in himself and all things around him he drank a lot and lived a life of a hermit. His death came almost unnoticed, and his name was quickly forgotten. Yet, according to N. Leikin, "In the memory of contemporaries he remained an exceptionally interesting, although typical figure, one of honest, innocent and sincere albeit slightly discordant bohemia of the 1860s".

== Legacy ==
Liodor Palmin professed more or less abstract democratic principles and had his political agenda described as 'amorphous', but never ceased praising 'fighting for freedom heroics' ("Rendes-Vous", 1865, "Eternal Lives", 1867) and expressed most ardent admiration for zealots and pioneers in social struggle. In his political poetry Palmin denounced halfway house results of the 1861 political reforms ("Common Songs"), deplored the general social apathy in Russia ("Magic Sounds of Mystery Strings", 1865) ridiculed liberals for their lack of principals ("Uncle Midnight", 1866). Arguably the most radical of his poems, Requiem ("Don't mourn dead fighters…", Iskra, No. 11, 1865) became a popular revolutionary song.

Palmin's poetry, having formed under the Iskra influence which mixed Nekrasov's "pathos of suffering" with Heine-derived "high-brow irony", amounted rarely to more than stilted and repetitive commentaries on contemporary issues. All the while Palmin retained his reputation of a "progressive man" and was a popular writer, "one of those who were being worshiped in Taganrog," according to Anton Chekhov. In 1970s Palmin was enjoying his reputation of the "keeper of revolutionary traditions in Russian poetry" and continued to fiercely attack his "age – dumb, cheap and mercenary in spirit", along with "all-pervading egotism of a mob", the two common evils which could be withstood only by the enormous might of a Poet, as he saw it ("In Memory of Nekrasov"). Seeing poetry as a strong formative moral instrument, Palmin never shied before using ‘lighter’ forms, like fables, feuilletons and couplets. His "Mikhey and the Philanthropist" couplet was considered to be his most successful and well-known.

Later literary scholars agreed that Palmin has never been a master of sharp political criticism, his verse, full of hints and half-spoken implementations, used spacious declarative monologues, stylistic clichés and borrowed a lot from mythology. Themes of personal tiredness and depression became prevalent in his 1880s work (From Winter Songs, 1882), his declarations becoming more and more repetitive and dour. All the while Palmin's popularity never waned and in Oskolki he remained the leading poet up until the 1880s. In fact, he's always remained "a censor's bane": while 300 of his works were published, 70 were banned.

Checkov regarded him "an original, even if very monotonous" poet and spoke highly of him personally. "Palmin is a thoroughly poetic figure… ever stuffed with themes and ideas... talk for 3 or 4 hours to him and you won't hear a false word, not a single banality", he wrote. According to Alexander Amfiteatrov, "Palmin had his own style of writing, his own imagery, his own temperament, what he lacked was an original concept and ideologically he's been always hanging behind his age, even if full of best intentions and all the right kinds of sensibilities."
