= Evgeny Karnovich =

Russian writer

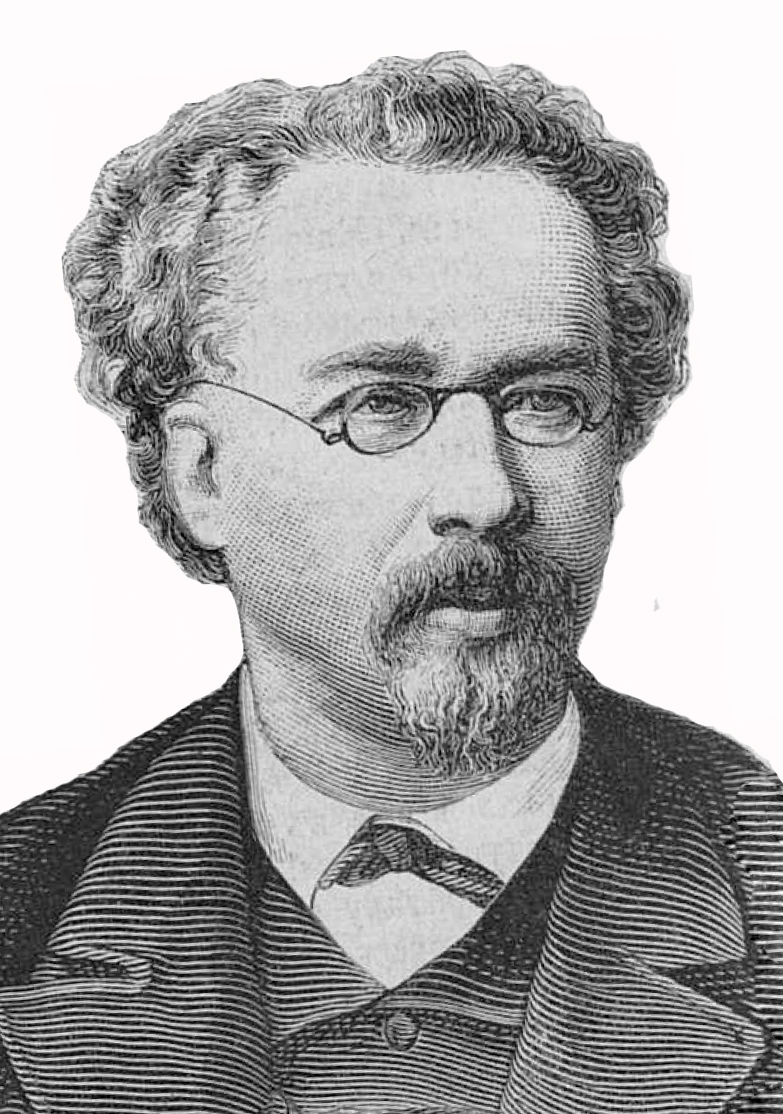
- Born: Evgeny Petrovich Karnovich; Евгений Петрович Карнович; 15 November 1823; Lupandino, Yaroslavl Governorate, Russian Empire
- Died: 6 November 1885 (aged 61); Saint Petersburg, Russian Empire
- Occupations: writer, historian, publicist

Evgeny Petrovich Karnovich (Russian: Евге́ний Петро́вич Карно́вич; 15 November 1823 – 6 November 1885) was Russian writer, historian, journalist and editor.

== Biography ==
Born in rural Yaroslavl region into an affluent Ukrainian noble Karnovich family, Evgeny started his literary career in the 1840s as a translator of Aristophanes' comedies and a poet, while working as a teacher, then a minor state official. Several years later he moved to Vilno, to become the head of the local Archeologist committee. In 1859, after retirement, Karnovich became a professional journalist, writing on the subjects of history, politics, social issues and jurisprudence, as well as publishing his own poems and stories.

In 1858–1861 he was the head of the Contemporary Review section Sovremennik, in 1865–1871, one of the leading figures in the Golos newspaper staff. He published the weekly magazine Mirovoi Posrednik (People's Attorney, 1861–1862), edited Birzhevyie Vedomosti (Stock Exchange News, 1875–1876) and Otgoloski (Echoes, 1881–1882). In his later years Karnovich, now a respected historian, published numerous essays (in Istorichesky Vestnik, Nedelya, Russkaya Mysl, Narodnaya Shkola and Nov) as well as several historical novels on the 17th–18th century Russian history.
