= Vladimir Shchiglev =

Russian poet-humorist and dramatist

- Born: Владимир Романович Щиглев; 1840; Saint Petersburg, Russian Empire
- Died: 1903 (aged 62–63); Saint Petersburg, Russian Empire
- Occupations: poet, playwright

Vladimir Romanovich Shchiglev (Russian: Владимир Романович Щиглев, 1840–1903) was a Russian satirical poet and playwright, who occasionally used the pseudonyms Shchigrov (for his plays) and Romanych (for poetry, as well as journalistic miscellaneous work).

Shchiglev, a Saint Petersburg University alumnus, whose major early influence was the children's writer Vasily Vodovozov, his one time gymnasium tutor, started to write early and later contributed regularly to Iskra, Russkoye Slovo, Budilnik and Niva. His best-known play, a vaudeville called Pomolvka v Galyornoy gavani (Помолвка в Галерной гавани, The Galernaya Bay Engagement, 1873), for thirty years remained part of the Russian Imperial Theatres' repertoire. Well-received were his plays for children, some of which came out in the 1898 Dyuzhinka (Дюжинка, Little Dozen) collection.

Some of Shiglev's work has never appeared in print in Russia. The play Zarnitsy (Зарницы, Heat Lightning) came out abroad, under the pseudonym Startseva. The satirical vaudeville Feskina kramola (Феськина крамола, Feska's Sedition), lampooning Russian secret police, was a hit with amateur underground theatre troupes of his time.
