= Aleksey Afanasyev =

Russian painter (1850–1920)

- Алексей Афанасьев
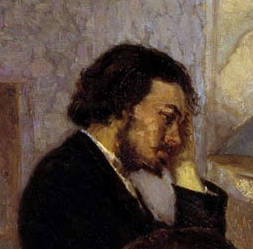
- Aleksey Afanasyev; detail from "Visit to a Sick Friend" by Kyriak Kostandi (1884)
- Born: November 30, 1850; Saint Petersburg
- Died: 1920 (aged 69–70)
- Education: Imperial Academy of Arts
- Known for: Painting
- Movement: Peredvizhniki

Aleksey Fyodorovich Afanasyev (also Afanasiev; (Russian: Алексе́й Фёдорович Афана́сьев; 30 November 1850 – 1920) was a Russian painter, graphic artist, caricaturist and illustrator. He was associated with the Peredvizhniki.

== Biography ==
His parents were servants at the Imperial Court, and he originally worked as a footman and stoker. In 1872, he began auditing classes at the Imperial Academy of Arts and was accepted as a student a year later. In 1877, he received a silver medal for his drawings from nature. From 1887 to 1905, he was a teacher at the Imperial Society for the Encouragement of the Arts.

In 1905, following the death of Konstantin Savitsky, he was named to succeed him as Director of the art college in Penza, near Moscow. He resigned (some sources say he was dismissed) four years later and returned to his position as teacher at the Imperial Society.

From 1889 to 1918, he participated in the exhibitions of the Peredvizhniki. After 1912, he provided drawings for several satirical, humorous and literary periodicals, including Fragments (Осколки). He also did illustrations for The Tale of Tsar Saltan and The Tale of the Fisherman and the Fish by Pushkin, as well as works by Aleksey Tolstoy; but his best-known works of this type are, perhaps, those for The Little Humpbacked Horse by Pyotr Yershov. Many of his illustrations were published as postcards. From 1894 to 1897, along with Viktor Vasnetsov, Mikhail Nesterov and other well-known painters, he participated in decorating the Church of the Savior on Spilled Blood, creating drawings for numerous mosaics.

He apparently disappeared during the Russian Civil War.

== Selected paintings ==
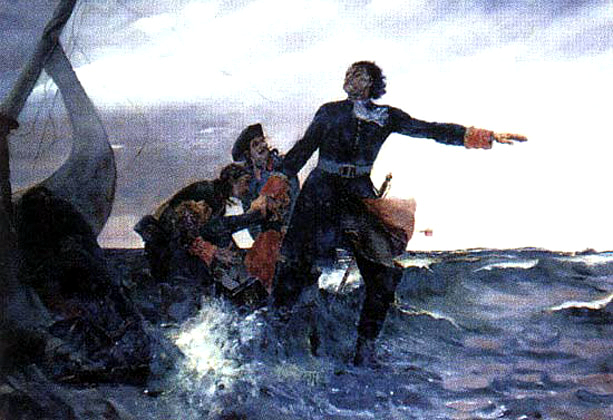
Peter the Great Saves the Lost Soldiers
near Lakhta (1914)

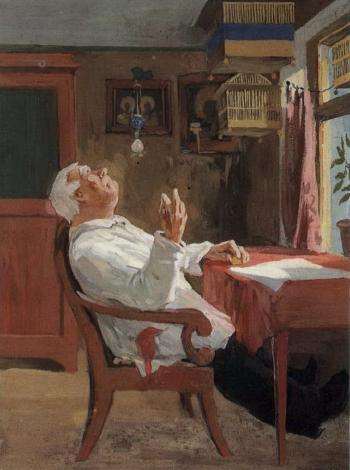
Holiday (1915)

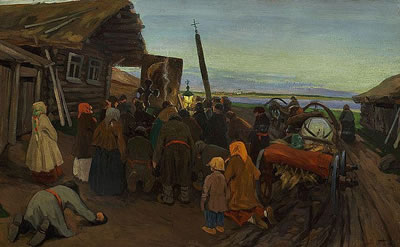
Presentation of the Icon (1916)
