= Levitov =

Levitov (Russian: Левитов) is a Russian masculine surname; its feminine counterpart is Levitova. It may refer to

- Aleksandr Levitov (1835–1877), Russian writer
- Helen Levitov Sobell (1918–2002), American teacher, scientist and activist
