= Klavdy Stepanov =

Russian painter

Klavdi Petrovich Stepanov (Russian: Клавдий Петрович Степанов) (1854-1910) was a Russian painter and monarchist publicist during the Belle Époque.

Stepanov was born near Moscow in 1854 into a Russian noble family of medieval lineage. His father, Pyotr Alexandrovich Stepanov, was a general who served as commandant of Tsarskoe Selo, and his grandfather had served as governor of Yeniseysk and Saratov. Stepanov studied history and languages at St. Petersburg University and audited courses at the Russian Imperial Academy of Arts, where his artistic work won him a silver medal despite the fact that he was not an enrolled student.

After completing his studies, Stepanov served in the Preobrazhensky Regiment in the Russo-Turkish War (1877-1878). Thereafter, he briefly worked in the Russian Ministry of Finance. In 1880 he moved to Paris to pursue painting and later relocated to Venice. His subjects included Renaissance scenes, genre paintings, and episodes of medieval Russian history. Stepanov's paintings rapidly became known for their subtle brushwork, strong colors, and beautiful characterizations. Beginning 1885, his work was regularly exhibited in Russia, where it was acquired by such collectors as Pavel Tretyakov and Grand Duke Konstantin Konstantinovich. In 1888 the Imperial Academy of Arts formally recognized him as an artist of the first rank.

Stepanov permanently returned to Russia in the early 1900s and became active in reactionary political circles that supported the Romanov dynasty and opposed the country's Westernization and adoption of Western institutions. In this capacity he worked as an editor of several newspapers and was active in politics. Toward the end of his life, he returned to art and founded a school of iconography at the Donskoy Monastery outside Moscow and worked on wall paintings in the Chudov Monastery.

Stepanov married Varvara von Ditmar and had four sons, two of whom were also painters. All four children emigrated from Russia after the Revolution of 1917. He died in Yalta, where he had gone to recover from an illness, on July 15 (28), 1910.

Today Stepanov's works can be found in Moscow's Tretyakov Gallery, St. Petersburg's Russian Museum, and other institutions and private collections.
