= Raznochintsy =

Social estate in the Russian Empire

Raznochintsy (Russian: разночинцы; Russian pronunciation: [rəznɐˈtɕintsɨ]; lit. 'people of miscellaneous ranks') (Note: The singular is raznochinets (Russian: разночинец, [rəznɐˈtɕinʲɪts]).) was an official category introduced in the Digest of Laws of the Russian Empire in the 17th century for a social estate that included the lower court and governmental ranks, children of personal dvoryans, and discharged military. The category of raznochintsy grew significantly during the massive trimming down of the category of service class people (Russian: служилые люди) in the second half of the 17th century. Raznochintsy were of taxable estate, meaning those who had to pay poll tax (Russian: подушная подать). In the mid-18th century the category was abolished and a significant part of raznochintsy were transferred into peasantry, but many became merchants and various urban categories (urban sosloviya). As a result, raznochintsy of the 17th and 18th centuries significantly contributed to the urban growth in Siberia.

Later, in the common speech the term acquired a somewhat opposite meaning—raznochintsy became to denote persons of non-noble origin who due to their education were excluded from the taxable status and could apply for the status of personal distinguished citizenship (Russian: личное почетное гражданство).

A significant number of Russian intelligentsia of the 19th century were raznochintsy.
