= Dmitry Minayev =

Russian writer (1835–1889)

Dmitry Dmitriyevich Minayev
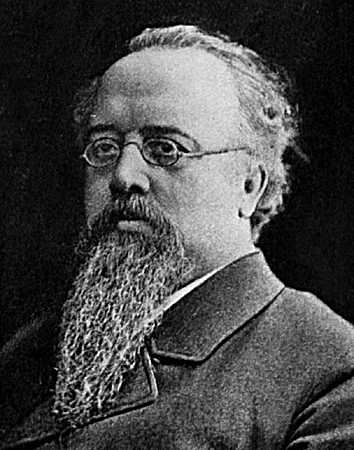
- Born: Дмитрий Дмитриевич Минаев; November 2, 1835; Simbirsk, Russian Empire
- Died: July 22, 1889 (aged 53); Simbirsk, Russian Empire
- Occupations: Satirical poet, translator

Dmitry Dmitriyevich Minayev (Russian: Дми́трий Дми́триевич Мина́ев, 2 November 1835 – 22 July 1889) was a Russian poet, parodist, journalist, translator and literary critic.

== Biography ==
Minayev was born in Simbirsk to the poet Dmitry Ivanovich Minayev, best known for his translation of The Tale of Igor's Campaign. After studying in 1847-1851 at the Konstantin's Artillery military college and three years of working as a clerk at the Simbirsk treasury he moved to Saint Petersburg and joined the Russian Foreign Ministry. After retirement in 1857 Minayev became the professional literary man and started contributing to numerous magazines, including Sovremennik and Russkoye Slovo. Working for in Iskra, he became a successful parodist, satirizing among others liberal authors like Afanasy Fet, Apollon Maykov, Nikolai Shcherbina and Vsevolod Krestovsky. Among the works of the foreign authors he translated were those by Lord Byron and Dante Alighieri.

After Dmitry Karakozov's attempt at the Tsar Alexander II's life, Minayev was arrested, accused of working for "magazines noted for their dangerous Socialist inclinations, notably Sovremennik and Russkoye Slovo" and spent four months in the Petropavlovskaya Fortress. In 1887 Minayev returned to his native Simbirsk. Two years later, on July 22, he died after prolonged illness.
