= Viktor Bilibin =

Russian writer and playwright

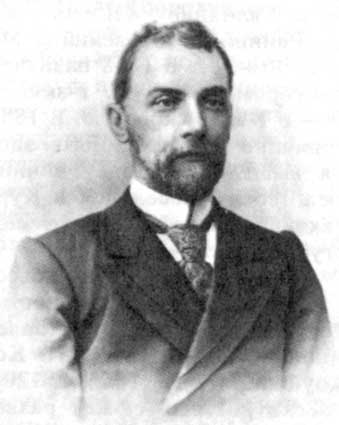
- Born: Виктор Викторович Билибин; 2 February 1859; Saint Petersburg, Russian Empire
- Died: 25 June 1908 (aged 49); Saint Petersburg, Russian Empire
- Occupations: journalist, playwright, humourist, editor

Viktor Viktorovich Bilibin (Russian: Виктор Викторович Билибин, 2 February 1859, Saint Petersburg, Imperial Russia, — 25 June 1908, Saint Petersburg) was a Russian writer and playwright, one of the leading Russian humourists and satirists of the late 19th century, who used the pen name I. Grek (И. Грэк). His best-known stories were collected in the books Love and Laughter (Любовь и смех, 1882), Humour and Fantasy (Юмор и фантазия, 1897) and Humorous Patterns (Юмористические узоры, 1898). After Nikolai Leykin's death he became the editor-in-chief of Oskolki (1906–1908).

Bilibin was a friend of Anton Chekhov, whom he corresponded with for 15 years (since 1885). The two co-authored at least one humorous sketch "Motley Fairytales" (Пёстрые сказки, Novaya Gazeta, 1886), signed The Two Ajaxes (Два Аякса). Chekhov admired Bilibin's sketches, referred to him as 'great talent' and cited him as an early influence.

Bilibin authored several humorous plays; they were produced by Alexandrinsky Theatre, as well as numerous provincial troupes, but failed to impress the critics. Alexander Amfiteatrov commented: "This man had been created for subtle, intelligent irony but in the long run chose to serve the primitive, guttural laughter. And he lost his gift of a humorist."
