= Pyotr Veinberg =

Russian poet, translator, journalist and literary historian

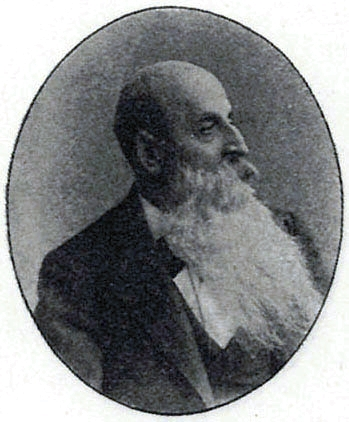
- Born: Pyotr Isaevich Veinberg; July 16 [O.S. July 28] 1831; Mykolaiv
- Died: July 3 [O.S. July 16] 1908; Saint Petersburg
- Occupation: Poet • translator • journalist • satirist

Pyotr Isaevich Veinberg (Russian: Пётр Иса́евич Ве́йнберг, July 16 (28) 1831, Mykolaiv, then Russian Empire, now Ukraine, – July 3 (16) 1908, Saint Petersburg, Russian Empire) was a Russian poet, translator, journalist and literary historian.

== Biography ==
Pyotr Veinberg was born in Mykolaiv to the family of a notary. After studying in the Odessa gymnasium and Richelieu's lyceum he joined Kharkov University's history and philology faculty, from which he graduated in 1854. For the next three years he was working in Tambov as a local governor's aide, editing the Tambov Governorate News newspaper’s unofficial section. One of his first poems, "He was a titular councillor" (1859), was an autobiographical one and dealt with his own unrequited love for the governor's daughter. Veinberg, Jewish by birth, adopted Christianity in his youth.

Pyotr Veinberg's literary career started in 1851 when the Panteon magazine published his translation of George Sand’s Claudie drama. In 1854 in Odessa a small compilation of his translations from Horace, André Chénier, Victor Hugo and Lord Byron came out. In 1856 The Russian Messenger published several of Veinberg’s own poems, subtitling it, mistakenly, "From Heine". This prompted the author to use a pseudonym, "Heine from Tambov".

In 1858 Veinberg moved to Saint Petersburg to embark upon a professional literary career. His poems and translations started to appear regularly in Sovremennik, Biblioteka Dlya Chteniya, Syn Otechestva, later in Nekrasov's Otechestvennye Zapiski. He became known as a satirist when the Veseltchak magazine published in 1858 his poetry cycle Grey-Colored Melodies and a series of humorous sketches called Life and Its Oddities. From 1859 to 1866 Veinberg contributed to Iskra magazine. Many of his work published there featured in the Humorous Poems of Heine from Tambov compilation (Saint Petersburg, 1863).

From 1868 to 1874 Veinberg worked as the head of the Russian literature cathedra at the Warsaw University. His treatise "Russian Folk Songs About Ivan the Terrible" was praised by the academic A. N. Veselovsky. On return to the capital he joined the Saint Petersburg University's Literature cathedra and lectured in several colleges and courses. In 1884 Weinberg adapted Ivan Turgenev’s Home of the Gentry for theater production. In 1885 he wrote a libretto for Eduard Nápravník's opera Harold. He compiled several textbooks on literature and theater and wrote a book Extracts from the History of Western Literature (1907). Several of his verses were put to music by composers like Cui, Grechaninov, Ippolitov-Ivanov.

In his later years Veinberg was an active member of the Russian Literary Fund. In 1905 he was elected an honorary member of the Russian Academy. Using his authority he did a lot to help authors persecuted by the government for political reasons; Maxim Gorky, German Lopatin and others.

== English translations ==
- The Dostoevsky Archive: Firsthand Accounts of the Novelist from Contemporaries' Memoirs and Rare Periodicals, (includes two accounts of Dostoyevsky by Pyotr Veinberg), McFarland & Company, 1997. ISBN 0786402644
