= Vladimir Kurochkin =

Russian dramatist, translator, editor and publisher

- Владимир Курочкин
- Born: February 6, 1829; Saint Petersburg, Russian Empire
- Died: April 20, 1885 (aged 56); Saint Petersburg, Russian Empire
- Occupations: Playwright, editor, translator, publisher

Vladimir Stepanovich Kurochkin (Владимир Степанович Курочкин; 6 February 1829 – 20 April 1885) was a Russian dramatist, translator, editor and publisher. Among the plays he authored were The Green Island (as Vlad K-n, with Innokenty Omulevsky; staged in 1873, published in 1883), Who Is to Blame? (1873), Two by Two is Five (1875) and A Modiste's Diary (1875). Vladimir Kurochkin compiled and published Nevsky Sbornik (the 1867 literary compilation). He edited Iskra magazine (1864–1867) and the Tatar-language Fayde (Virtue) newspaper (1866–1870). Poets Nikolai and Vasily Kurochkins were his brothers.
