= Oskolki =

Russian humorous, literary and artistic weekly magazine

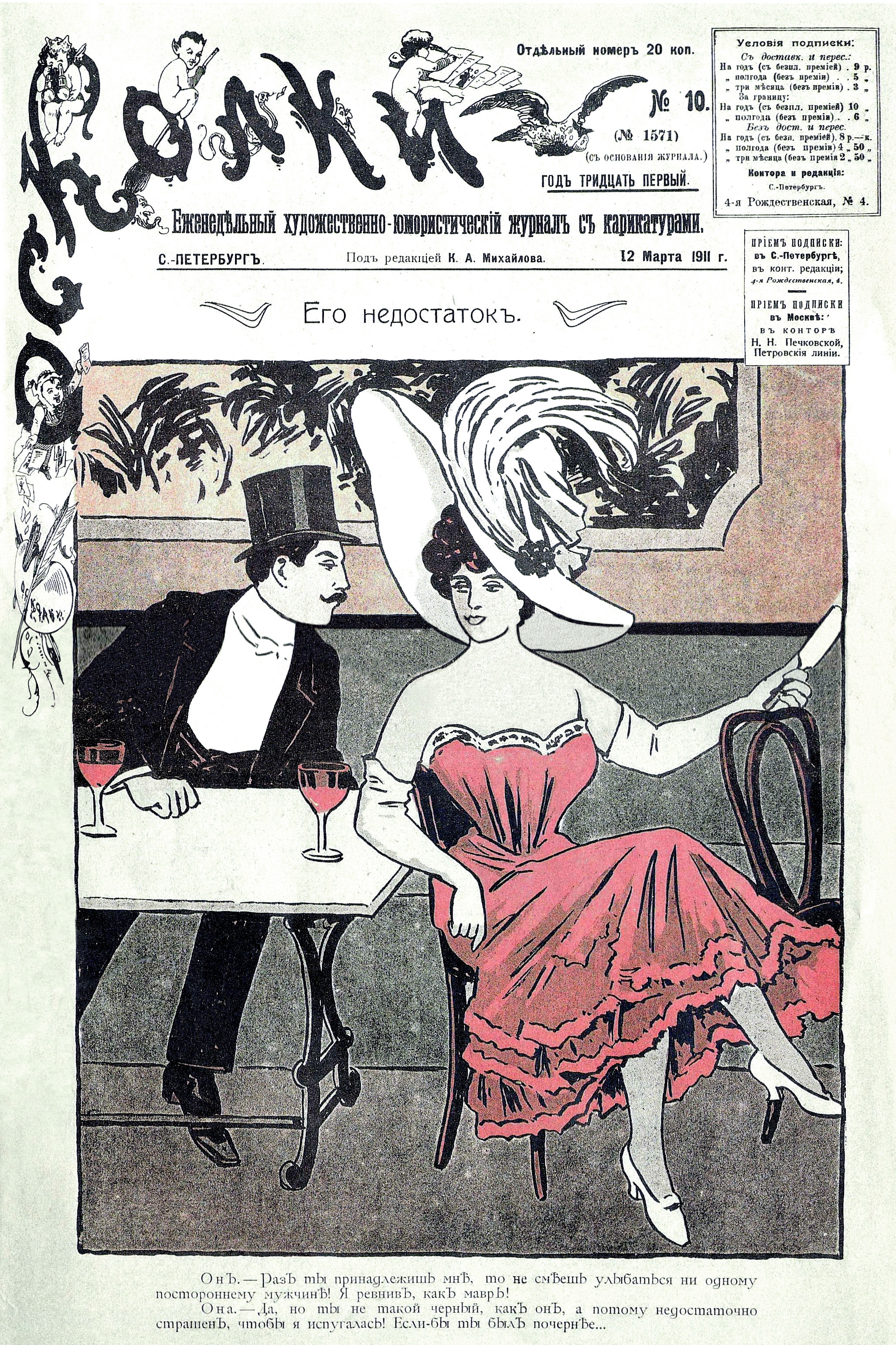
- Oskolki cover, 1911.
- Editor: Nikolay Leykin; Viktor Bilibin; K. Mikhailov
- Frequency: Weekly
- Founded: 1881
- Final issue: 1916
- Based in: St Petersburg
- Language: Russian

Oskolki (Russian: Осколки) was a Russian humorous, literary and artistic weekly magazine published in St Petersburg from 1881 to 1916.

== History ==
From 1881 to 1906 Oskolki was published by the popular writer Nikolay Leykin. From 1906 to 1908 it was run by the humorist Viktor Bilibin.

In the 1880s Oskolki was known as the most liberal of Russian humorous magazines. Oskolki played an important part in the early career of Anton Chekhov. From 1882 to 1887 Oskolki published more than 270 of Chekhov's works.

== Contributors ==
=== Poets and writers ===
- Alexander Amfiteatrov
- Anton Chekhov
- Vladimir Gilyarovsky
- Pyotr Gnedich
- Evgeny Kohn
- Nikolai Leskov
- Konstantin Lydov
- Vladimir Mazurkevich
- Liodor Palmin
- Nikolay Poznyakov

=== Artists ===
- Aleksey Afanas'ev
- Alexander I. Lebedev
- Nikolay Chekhov
