= Nikolai Kurochkin =

Russian poet, editor, translator and essayist

Nikolai Stepanovich Kurochkin
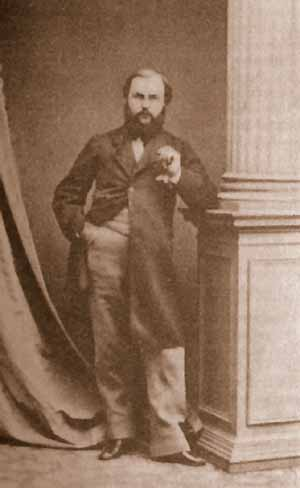
- Born: Николай Степанович Курочкин; June 4, 1830; Saint Petersburg, Russian Empire
- Died: December 14, 1884 (aged 54); Saint Petersburg, Russian Empire
- Occupations: poet, editor, translator

Nikolai Stepanovich Kurochkin (Николай Степанович Курочкин, 4 June 1830, Saint Petersburg, Russian Empire, — 14 December 1884, Saint Petersburg, Russian Empire) was a Russian poet, editor, translator (Arsène Houssaye novels, Italian poetry) and essayist. Writing under numerous pseudonyms (Preobrazhensky, Chereret, etc.), Kurochkin published both satirical poems and serious essays (including Letters from Paris and Milan, in 1874-1876) mostly in Otechestvennye Zapiski, of which since 1868 he was a major contributor, and Iskra, the magazine he co-edited. In 1865-1867 he edited the magazine Knizhny Vestnik. Vasily and Vladimir Kurochkins were his brothers.
