= Fyodor Reshetnikov (writer) =

Russian author

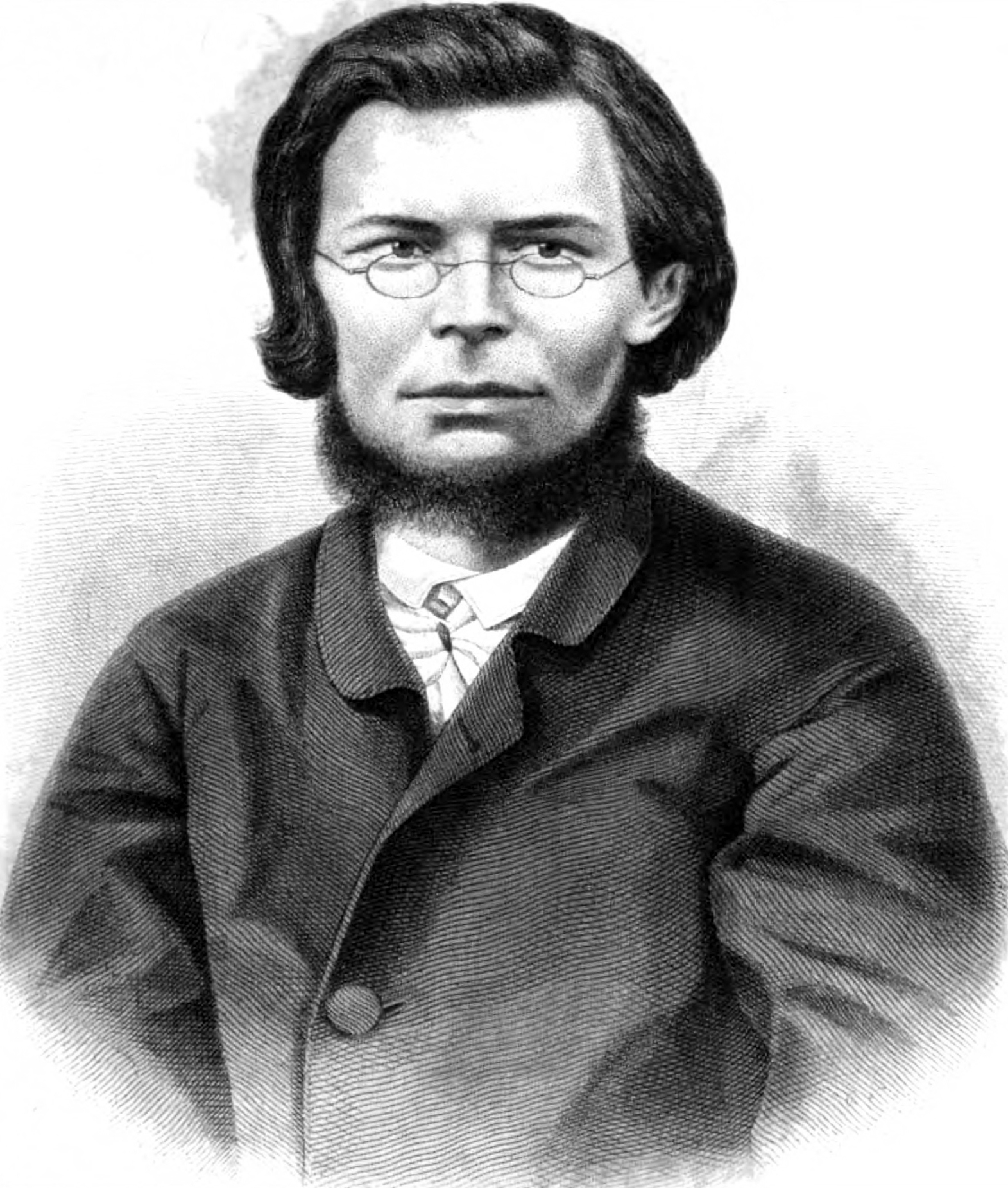
- Born: 17 September 1841; Yekaterinburg, Perm Governorate, Russian Empire
- Died: 21 March 1871 (aged 29); Saint Petersburg, Russia
- Spouse: S. S. Kargopolova (m. 1865)
- Children: 2

Signature
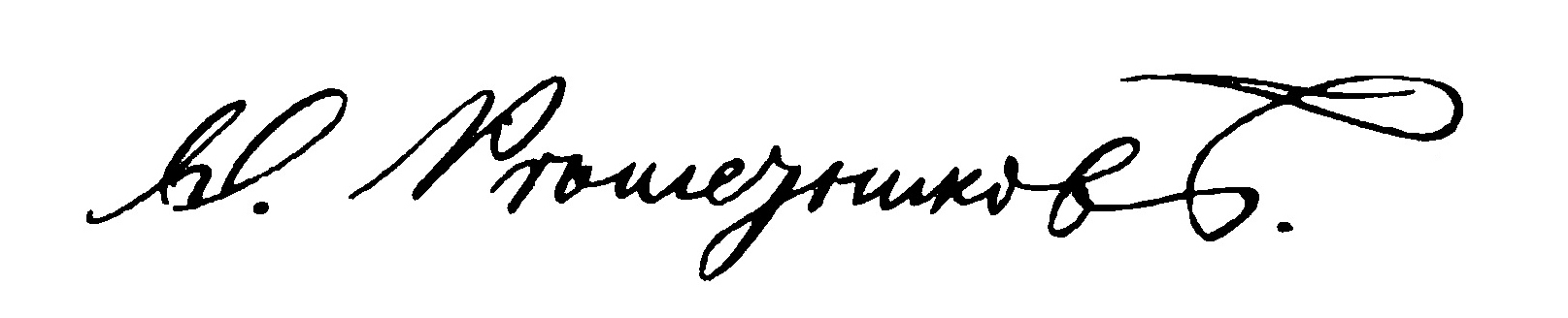

Fyodor Mikhaylovich Reshetnikov (Russian: Фёдор Миха́йлович Реше́тников; 17 September [O.S. 5 September] 1841 – 21 March [O.S. 9 March] 1871) was a Russian author. In his short 29 ½ years, he published to critical acclaim a number of novels dealing with the plight of the lower classes.

== Early life ==
Reshetnikov was born in Yekaterinburg. His father was a post office clerk, his mother died one year after his birth. After his mother's death, Reshetnikov was brought up in Perm by his uncle, also a postal employee.

At age fourteen he was prosecuted for stealing mail. After a lengthy trial, he was convicted and sentenced to a three-month term at a monastery. After eventually graduating, Reshetnikov served as a clerk in Yekaterinburg and Perm.

== Literary career ==
Reshetnikov began experimenting with writing in 1860 at age 19. Around that time he started his lifelong research into the condition of the lower classes. Of particular interest to Reshetnikov were the lowly burlaki, who became the subjects of the author's first major work, the "ethnographic essay" Podlipovtsy, a withering indictment of their deplorable condition.

In 1863 Reshetnikov moved to Saint Petersburg and earned a meager existence by publishing essays in a newspaper, then becoming a clerk in the Ministry of Finance. Shortly after arriving he was introduced to Nikolay Nekrasov, who agreed to publish Podlipovtsy in his authoritative literary journal Sovremennik (1864).

During the balance of the 1860s, Reshetnikov undertook investigative trips to the Ural Mountains region of his birth, and wrote numerous essays and novels exposing and critiquing the plight of the laborer and peasant classes.

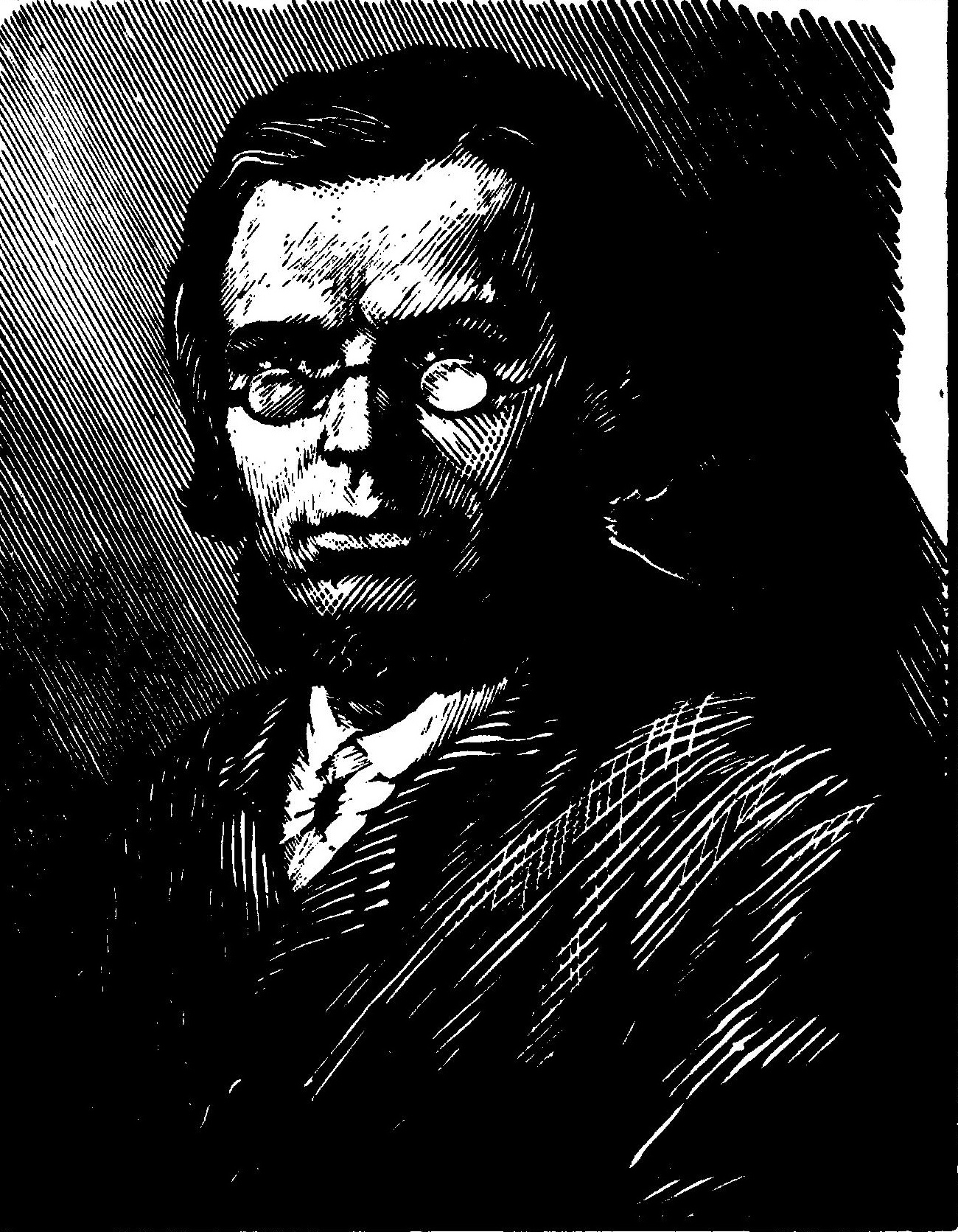
A drawing of Reshetnikov.

== Personal life ==
Reshetnikov married S. S. Kargopolova in 1865; they had two children. Closer to the end of his life Reshetnikov became depressed due to the difficulty of raising a family on a writer's income. He also battled with alcoholism. Reshetnikov died in Saint Petersburg in 1871 and was buried in that city's Volkovo Cemetery. The cause of death was pneumonia.

== English Translations ==
- The Podlipnayans, (Novel), University of South Carolina Press, 1973.

== Sources ==
- Reshetnikov's bibliography, full text of many of his works, several full-text biographical sketches (in Russian)
- Biography from the Krugosvet encyclopedia (in Russian)
