= Aleksandr Levitov =

Russian writer

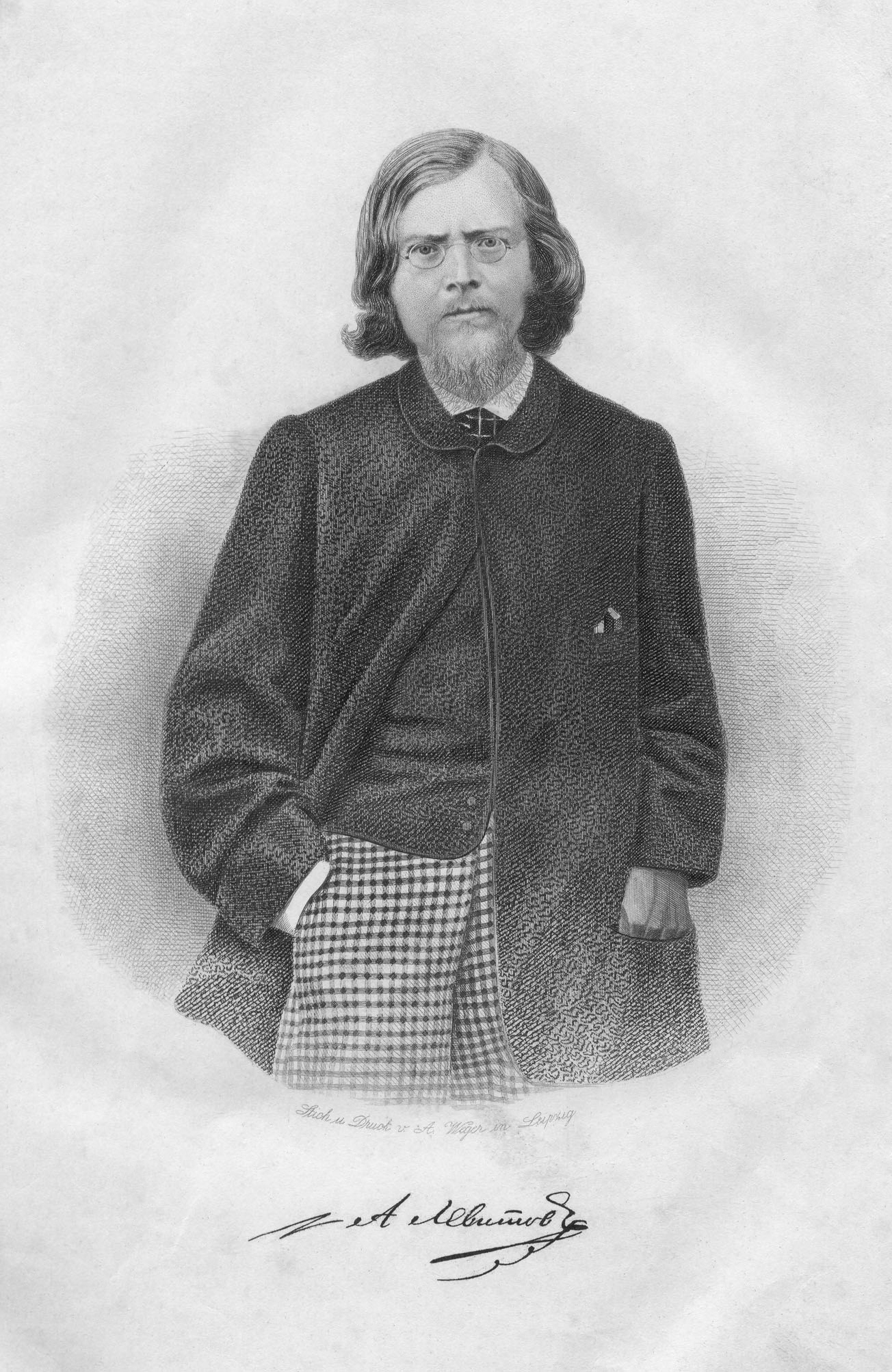
- Born: August 1, 1835; Tambov Governorate, Russia
- Died: January 16, 1877 (aged 41); Moscow, Russia

Alexander Ivanovich Levitov (Russian: Алекса́ндр Ива́нович Леви́тов; August 1, 1835 – January 16, 1877), was a Russian writer.

== Biography ==
Levitov was born in the village of Dobroye, in Tambov Governorate, where his father was a sexton. He learned to read and write in a school for peasant children set up by his father in their home. Later he attended the Tambov Seminary.

He left the seminary before finishing his studies, traveled to Moscow, and then to St Petersburg, where he entered the Academy of Medicine and Surgery in 1855. In 1856 he was exiled to Shenkursk for taking part in political agitation. In Shenkursk he associated primarily with the lower classes, and began drinking. He composed his first short stories during this three-year period of exile.

In the 1860s and 1870s Levitov's stories and sketches were published in the Russian magazines Russkaya Rech (Russian Speech), Moskovsky Vestnik (Moscow Herald), Sovremennik (The Contemporary), Vremya (Time, edited by Mikhail Dostoyevsky), and Otechestvennye Zapiski (Annals of the Fatherland). During this time he wandered through many of the towns and cities of Russia, drinking heavily, and living in poor conditions. His habits eventually led to serious illness.

Levitov died of tuberculosis in a Moscow clinic in 1877. The funeral costs were paid for with money collected from students.

== English translations ==
- Leatherhide the Cobbler, (story), from In the Depths, Raduga Publishers, 1987,
  or from Anthology of Russian Literature, Part 2, Leo Wiener, G.P. Putnam's Sons, 1903. from Archive.org
