= Vasily Kurochkin =

Vasily Stepanovich Kurochkin
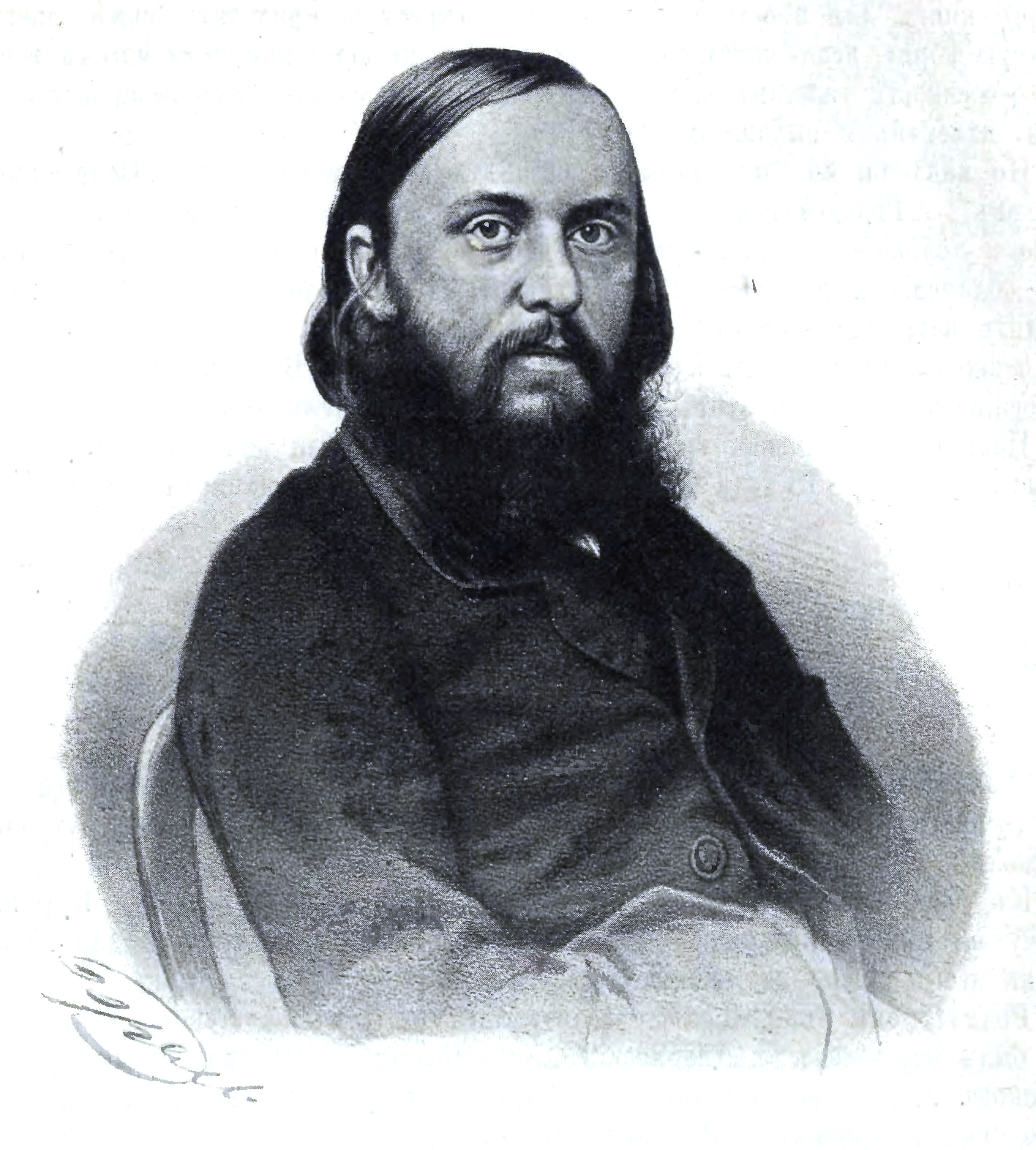
- Born: Василий Степанович Курочкин; 9 August 1831; Saint Petersburg, Russian Empire
- Died: 27 August 1875 (aged 44); Saint Petersburg, Russian Empire
- Occupations: poet journalist political activist
- Years active: 1848-1875

Vasily Stepanovich Kurochkin (Russian: Василий Степанович Курочкин; 9 August 1831 – 27 August 1875) was a Russian satirical poet, journalist and translator.

== Biography ==
Vasily Kurochkin was born in Saint Petersburg. His father, a former serf peasant who had been granted freedom and worked his way up the social ladder to nobility status, died young, and the boy was brought up by his stepfather, Colonel E.T. Gotovtsev. Two of his brothers, Vladimir (1829-1885) and Nikolai Kurochkins (1830-1884), became writers as well.

Having graduated the First Cadet Corps in 1849, Vasily Kurochkin joined the Russian Army as a junior officer. He started writing poetry while a cadet, debuted as a published poet in 1848 and in 1856 (four years after retiring from the military) started the career of a literary professional. Highly acclaimed were his translations of Beranger (1858, 1864 and 1874 collections) and Molière (Le Misanthrope ou l'Atrabilaire amoureux, 1867).

In the late 1850s Kurochkin became one of Russia's most prominent political satirists. In 1859, along with the cartoonist Nikolai Stepanov, he founded the influential satirical Iskra magazine. In 1861 Kurochkin joined the underground radical group Zemlya i Volya and a year later became one of the five members of its central committee. After Dmitry Karakozov's attempt upon the life of Alexander II, he was arrested and spent two months in the Petropavlovsk Fortress. In 1867 the first edition of The Works of V.S. Kurochkin was published.

Kurochkin died on 27 August 1875 in Saint Petersburg after accidentally overdosing on chloral hydrate prescribed to him by the doctor. He is interred in Volkovo Cemetery in Saint Petersburg.
