= Iskra (magazine) =

Russian satirical weekly magazine

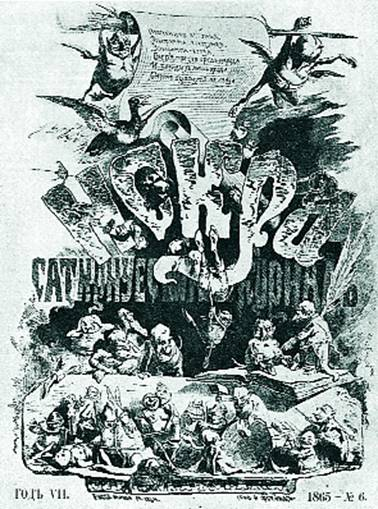
- Iskra 1865, No. 6, cover
- Editor: Vasily Kurochkin (1859—1864); Nikolai Stepanov (1859—1864); Vladimir Kurochkin (1864-1873)
- Frequency: Weekly
- Circulation: 10,000 (1862—1863)
- Founded: 1859
- Final issue: 1873
- Based in: Saint Petersburg, Russian Empire
- Language: Russian

Iskra (Russian: Искра, Spark) was a Russian satirical weekly published in Saint Petersburg in 1859–1873.

The magazine, founded by the caricaturist Nikolai Stepanov and poet Vasily Kurochkin was a Socialist publication, targeting social inequality and the Tsarism. Yet, in its heyday it attracted a host of famous authors from diverse literary factions, including Alexey K. Tolstoy, Alexey Zhemchuzhnikov, Alexey Pleshcheyev, Lev Mei, Viktor Burenin, Liodor Palmin, Vladimir Shchiglev, Gleb and Nikolai Uspenskys, Alexander Levitov, Pavel Yakushkin, Fyodor Reshetnikov, Grigory Eliseev. Iskra became famous for its caricatures, made by the best Russian artists of the time, among them Nikolai Stepanov, Mikhail Mikeshin, Mikhail Znamensky.

Throughout its history Iskra suffered from severe censorship, and in 1865 was forced to part with Vasily Kurochkin. It was finally closed in 1873.
