= Nikolai Leykin =

Russian writer, artist, playwright, journalist and publisher

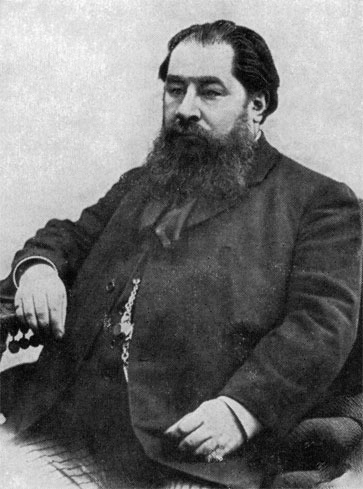
- Born: December 19, 1841; Saint Petersburg, Russia
- Died: January 19, 1906 (aged 64); Saint Petersburg, Russia

Nikolai Alexandrovich Leykin (Russian: Никола́й Алекса́ндрович Ле́йкин; December 19, 1841 – January 19, 1906) was a Russian writer, artist, playwright, journalist and publisher.

== Biography ==
Leykin was born in Saint Petersburg into a merchant family. The merchant class was the subject of the majority of his fiction. His popular work Our Folk Abroad, set in Paris, which went through twenty-five editions, was a light satire on the ignorance and boorishness of Russian business men.

From 1882 to 1905, Leykin was the publisher and editor of the comic magazine Fragments. It was in this magazine that Anton Chekhov began his literary career. Chekhov contributed over two hundred stories to Fragments from 1882 to 1887.

Leykin met Anton Chekhov and his brother Nikolay Chekhov in October, 1882. Chekhov was paid by the line for his weekly contributions, and was allotted a quarter of the magazine's weekly length. Nikolay Chekhov provided centerfold and cover pictures. Leykin was Russia's most prolific author of comic sketches, which were widely read. As an editor he was known for his tough stance with the censors. He drew major writers to Fragments, including Nikolai Leskov.
