= Nadezhda Merder =

Russian writer (1839–1906)

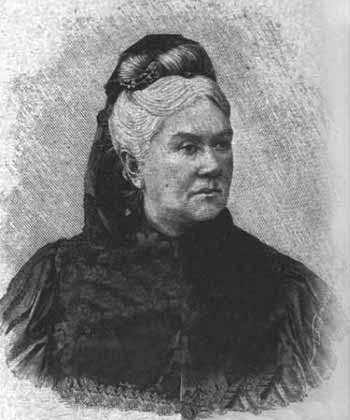
- Born: Nadezhda Ivanovna Svechina; 1839
- Died: 13 March 1906 (aged 66–67); Moscow, Russia
- Occupations: Writer; playwright

Nadezhda Ivanovna Merder (Russian: Надежда Ивановна Мердер; née Svechina [Свечина]; 1839 – 13 March 1906) was a Russian writer and playwright, better known by her pen name N. Severin (Russian: Н. Северин).

== Life ==
Born to a retired military man belonging to an old Russian rural gentry family, she debuted in Otechestvennye Zapiski with her 1877 short novel Out of Order (Russian: Не в порядке вещей) to be followed by numerous (in all, more than one hundred) novels, plays and novellas, which appeared originally in the magazines Delo, Zhivopisnoye Obozreniye, Vestnik Evropy, Istorichesky Vestnik, Niva. Of the several plays she wrote for theatre, the best known was Happiness in Marriage (Супружеское счастье, 1884).

Forgotten during the Soviet times, N. Severin's legacy was revived in 1990s after her selected works were published in 1997.

== Sources ==
- "Северин (Мердер)" . Brockhaus and Efron Encyclopedic Dictionary (in Russian). 1906.
