= Arseny Vvedensky =

Russian literary critic and historian (1844–1909)

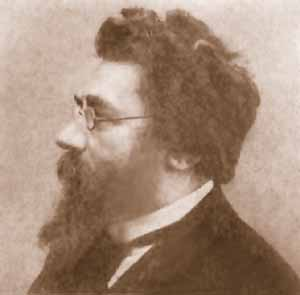
- Born: Арсений Иванович Введенский; November 7, 1844; Tver Governorate, Imperial Russia
- Died: October 30, 1909 (aged 64); Bologoye, Novgorod Governorate, Imperial Russia
- Occupations: literary critic and historian

Arseny Ivanovich Vvedensky (Russian: Арсений Иванович Введенский; 7 November 1844 – 30 October 1909) was a Russian literary critic and historian, essayist and author of feuilletons, which he published in Golos, using the pseudonym Aristarkhov.

Vvedensky debuted as a literary critic in 1876 and, contributing mostly to Slovo, Severny Vestnik, Vestnik Evropy, Delo, Niva and Istorichesky Vestnik, published numerous reviews and analytical surveys on Nikolai Leskov, Nikolai Leykin, Evgeny Salias De Tournemire, Vsevolod Krestovsky, Vladimir Korolenko, Fyodor Dostoyevsky and Vsevolod Garshin, among others.

In 1891—1893 he compiled and edited the works of Alexander Griboyedov, Ivan Kozlov, Alexey Koltsov, Alexander Polezhayev, Mikhail Lomonosov, Denis Fonvizin and Catherine the Great, all of which came out as Niva literary supplements. In 1891 he edited the first academic-type edition of the Complete M.Y. Lermontov in 4 volumes.
