= Elena Apreleva =

Russian writer (1846–1923), editor

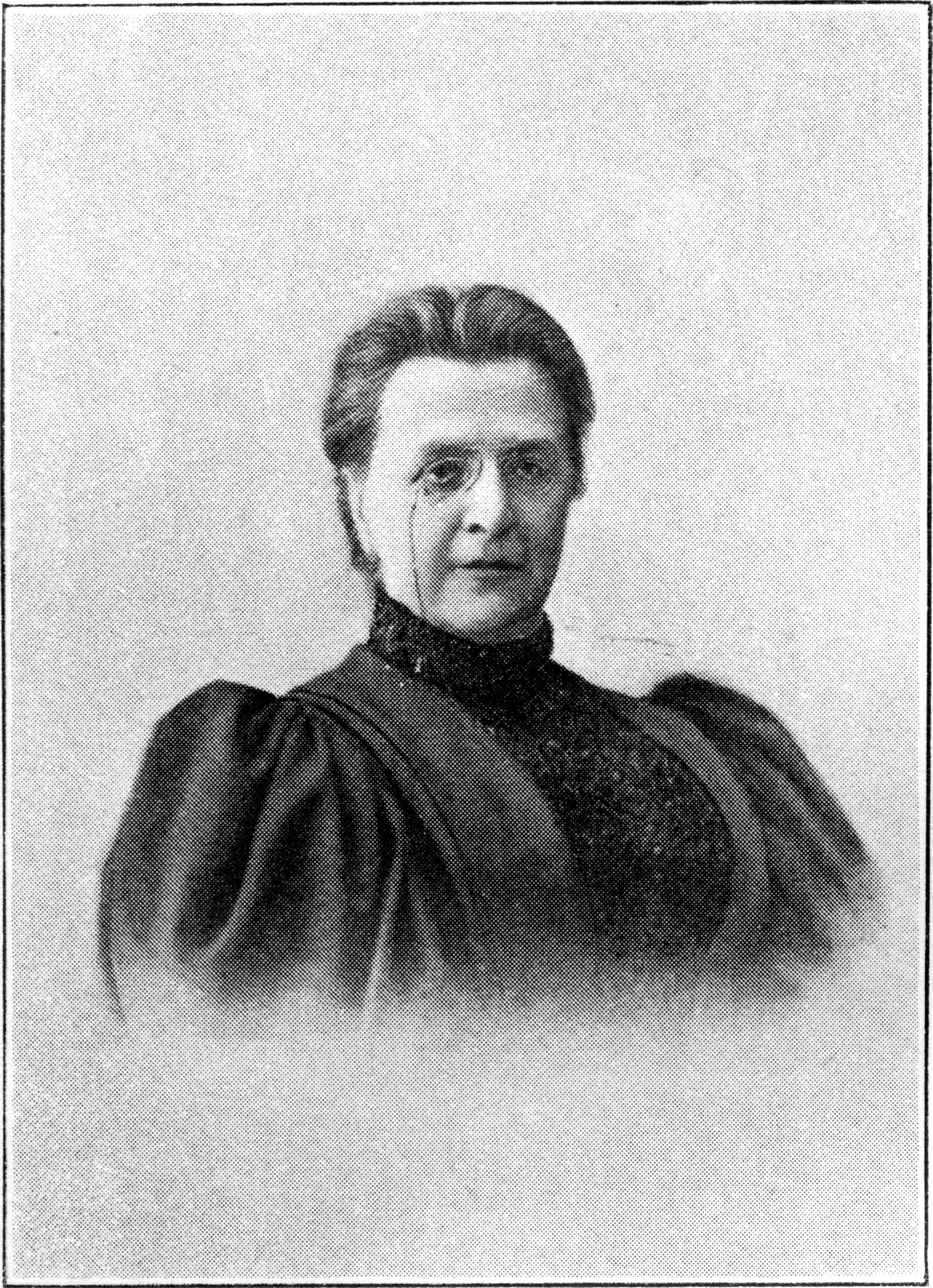
- Born: Elena Ivanovna Blaramberg; 24 February 1846; Orenburg, Russian Empire
- Died: 4 December 1923 (aged 77); Belgrade, Yugoslavia
- Occupations: writer, translator, pedagogue
- Spouse: Pyotr Alexeyevich Aprelev (1841–1906)

Elena Ivanovna Apréleva (Russian: Елена Ивановна Апрелева, née Blaramberg; 24 February 1846 – 4 December 1923), also known by her pseudonym E. Ardov, was a Russian prose writer, memoirist, playwright, and children's writer.

== Early life and education ==
Elena Blaramberg was born in Orenburg to her Belgian father, a military geodesist Ivan Fyodorovich Blaramberg, who served as a general in the Russian army, and her Greek mother Elena Pavlovna, née Mavromikhali. In 1854, her parents moved Elena and her two brothers from Orenburg to Saint Petersburg. There, she was educated by tutors, and passed the government examination required to become a teacher.

In 1870 Blaramberg compiled and edited the book Games and Lessons for Children. In 1871, along with Yulian Simashko, she started to publish and edit the journal Semya i Shkola, then became the head of its Children's Literature section. She edited the first 7 issues of the journal, and published there her Ocherki Sibiri (Siberian Sketches). In 1872, Apréleva attended the University of Geneva to pursue a degree, as higher education was denied to women in Russia. Ultimately, she never completed her studies due to health problems.

== Writing career ==
Apreleva's works were mostly concerned with contemporary society and pedagogy. She began publishing in 1868, primarily in historical and educational journals. In 1876 she left Russia and settled in Paris where, under the mentorship of Ivan Turgenev she completed Guilty without Guilt (Без вины виноватые), her debut short novel which first appeared in Vestnik Evropy in 1877. She later created her pseudonym as an anagram of Turgenev's beloved, opera singer Pauline Viardot.

More novels and novelettes followed, including Vasyuta, Little Countess, Timophey and Anna, published originally in Delo and Niva, as well as some journals for children. Apréleva moved to Central Asia from 1889 to 1906, where she continued to write. She wrote approximately sixty short stories and articles for the Moscow-based newspaper Russkiye Vedomosti which she was also a staff member. It was there that she published her Crimean Sketches, the original 26 Central Asian Sketches, as well as several memoirs, including those on Ivan Turgenev, Alexey Pisemsky and Nikolai Shelgunov. In 1898 her play Broken Shards (Битые черепки) was produced on stage the Maly Theatre in Moscow. Many of her ethnographic descriptions of Central Asian and Crimean peoples conveyed these cultures to Russian readers.

== Personal life ==
Apreleva was the model for Ilya Repin's portrait of Sofia Alekseevna, Peter the Great's sister and regent.

In 1890 she married Pyotr Vasilyevich Aprelev, a state official with whom she spent some 15 years first in Central Asia, first Samarkand and then Tashkent. In 1906 she witnessed her husband being murdered in his own Petrovskoye estate nearby Sochi by a group of Imereti revolutionaries. The traumatic effect of this horror was such that she all but lost her sight and stopped writing altogether. In 1920 Apreleva left Soviet Russia for Serbia via Novorossiysk. She died in Belgrade on 4 December 1923 and is interred in the Topčider Cemetery.

Elena and Pyotr Aprelevs had two sons, the navy officer and writer Boris Aprelev and colonel Georgy Aprelev (1889—1964) the director of the Russian Cadet Corps in Versaille.

== Works ==
- Games and Pastimes for Children, 1870
- Guilty without Guilt, 1877
- Vasiuta, 1881
- Rufina Kazdoeva, 1892
- Broken Shards, 1892
- Sketches, 1893
- An Outstanding Woman, 1894
- Torments of an Editor, 1902
- Two Worlds, 1909, a collection of short stories for children
- Central Asian Sketches, 1935, published post-mortem in Shanghai
