= Zhenskii vestnik (1866) =

Former monthly political women's magazine in Russia (1866–1868)

- Categories: Political magazine
- Frequency: Monthly
- Founded: 1866
- Final issue: 1868
- Country: Russian Empire
- Based in: Saint Petersburg
- Language: Russian

Zhenskii vestnik (Russian: Женский вестник, Women's Herald) was a Russian monthly magazine published in Saint Petersburg in 1866–1868 by A.B. Messarosh, with the professed objective of "helping to improve the social conditions for women in Russia". In 1866—1867 Zhenskii vestnik remained one of the just two journals in the country (alongside Delo), belonging to the left and trying to continue the traditions set by Sovremennik, closed in 1866.

Its formal editor-in-chief of it was N.M. Messarosh, but in reality the journal was run by the two prominent authors and journalists who came from the recently shut down Russkoe slovo, Nikolai Blagoveshchensky and Alexander Sheller. Apart from them, among the authors who contributed to it regularly were Vasily Sleptsov, Pyotr Tkachev, Gleb Uspensky, Yakov Polonsky and Evgenia Konradi.
