= Anatoly Faresov =

Russian publicist, literary critic and journalist

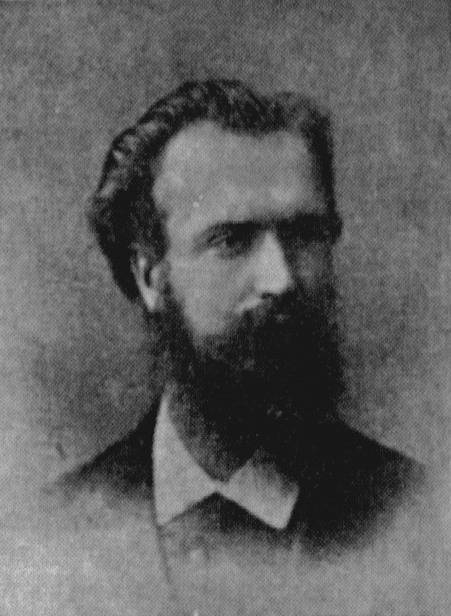
- Born: Anatoly Ivanovich Faresov; 16 June 1852; Tambov, Russian Empire
- Died: 15 October 1928 (aged 76); Leningrad, Soviet Union
- Occupations: journalist, writer, publicist, political activist

Anatoly Ivanovich Faresov (Russian: Анатолий Иванович Фаресов; 16 June 1852 – 15 October 1928) was a radical publicist, literary critic and journalist who lived in the Russian Empire and later in the Soviet Union.

Faresov was born in Tambov, into a noble family of Ivan Faresov, a Collegiate Councillor. A Narodnaya Volya activist, in 1874 he was arrested and spent four years in the Petropavlovskaya Fortress. After the release Faresov started writing for several leading Russian magazines, including Zhivopisnoe obozrenie, Molva (where in 1880, as Anatolyev, he published his prison memoirs which came out as a separate edition in 1900), Delo, Novoye Vremya, Nedelya and Istorichesky Vestnik.

Faresov authored numerous biographies of his contemporaries, notably of Nikolai Chernyshevsky, Nikolai Leskov, Iosif Kablits, Alexander Engelgardt, Alexander Sheller, Alexander Neustroyev. His stories came out in a book called My Muzhiks (Мои мужики, 1900), shorter pieces were collected in The Awakened People (Пробужденный народ. Очерки с натуры. 1908), A Nation Without Vodka (Народ без водки, 1916), Man and Sobriety (Народ и трезвость, 1917).

Faresov died on 15 October 1928 in Leningrad.
