= Nikolai Blagoveshchensky =

Russian writer, journalist and ethnographer

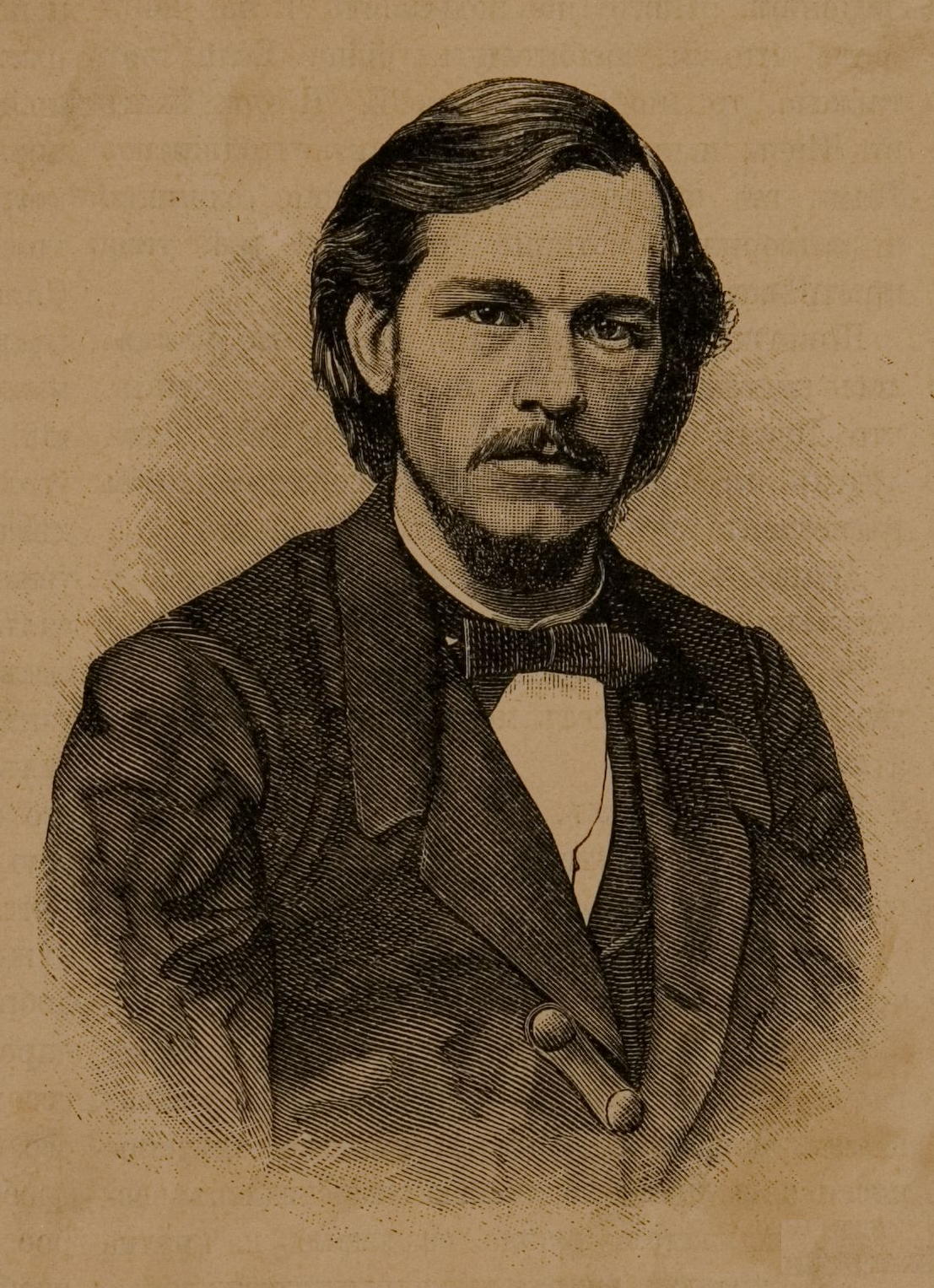
- Born: April 19, 1837; Moscow, Russian Empire
- Died: July 20, 1889 (aged 52); Vladikavkaz, Russian Empire
- Writing career
- Period: 1860s–late 1880s

Nikolai Alexandrovich Blagoveshchensky (Russian: Никола́й Алекса́ндрович Благове́щенский), (April 19, 1837, Moscow – July 20, 1889, Vladikavkaz), was a Russian writer, journalist and ethnographer.

== Early life ==
Blagoveshchensky was the son of a priest. He graduated from Alexander Nevsky religious school and from the St. Petersburg Theological Seminary, where he befriended the future writer Nikolai Pomyalovsky. After the death of Pomyalovsky, Blagoveshchensky was involved in preserving Pomyalovsky's heritage, writing the first biography of the writer, which is commonly included in editions of Pomyalovsky's collected works.

== Career ==
After graduating from the seminary, Blagoveshchensky was apprenticed to the Archimandrite Porfiry, a famous archaeologist and orientalist, and went with him to Mount Athos and Jerusalem, where he stayed for nearly two years (1858-1859), recording his travelling experiences in notes and drawings. The first printed works of Blagoveshchensky were stories written in the wake of the journey: From the Memoirs of a Season at Jerusalem, In Thessaly and November. Upon his return to Russia in 1862, he began working for the journal Time edited by Fyodor Dostoyevsky and his brother Mikhail.

Blagoveshchensky became known through his essays about clerical life: Athos, 1864 and Among the Pilgrims, 1871. His collection of essays Athos was printed in the magazine Russian Word, of which Blagoveshchensky became editor in 1864. In 1866 the magazine was banned, and Blagoveshchensky became the editor of the Women's Herald, along with Alexander Sheller, and later edited the journal The Week. At this time he published in Russian Word the novel Before the Dawn, which depicted the life of a raznochintsy democrat. Censors conceded they've made a grave mistake by letting part I (At the Graveyard, На погосте, 1865) slip though. So, Part II (In the Capital, В столице, 1866) was promptly banned (for "graphically depicting the inner life of a religious sect") and the magazine received a 6 months suspension.

== Later life ==
In 1869, Blagoveshchensky was stricken by paralysis. After partially recovering, he went on with his literary work, publishing his Essays from Working Life in the journal Notes of the Fatherland. Later, while being treated for his paralytic condition at the Caucasian Mineral Waters, he made friends with Count Loris-Melikov, at the invitation of whom he stayed in Vladikavkaz. Loris-Melikov gave Blagoveshchensky the post of Secretary of the Terek Statistical Committee. During his last years he was engaged in writing descriptions and collecting statistics relating to the Terek region. In 1880-1889 he edited Terskiye Vedomosti, a Terek-based newspaper. He died in Vladikavkaz in 1889.

=== English translations ===
- A Visit to an Iron Foundry, from In the Depths, Raduga Publishers, Moscow, 1987.
