= Vladimir Stoyunin =

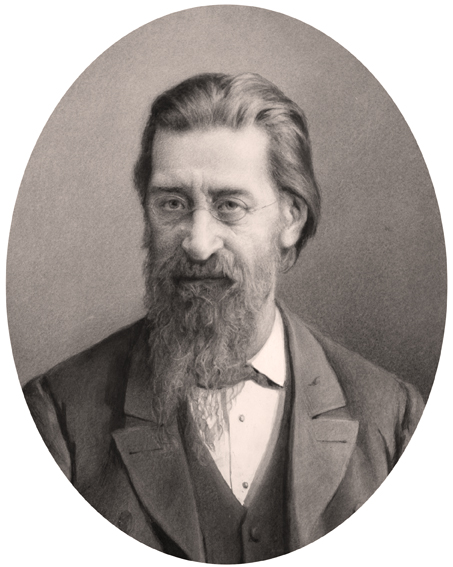
- Born: 28 December 1826; Saint Petersburg, Russian Empire
- Died: 16 November 1888 (aged 61); Saint Petersburg, Russian Empire
- Occupations: pedagogue, essayist, publicist

Vladimir Yakovlevich Stoyunin (Russian: Владимир Яковлевич Стоюнин, 28 December 1826 — 16 November 1888) was a Saint-Petersburg-born Russian pedagogue, educational theorist, essayist and publicist.

An influential thinker, considered to be heir to Konstantin Ushinsky's legacy, Stoyunin was a pioneering figure in the development of women's education in Russia. His most cherished project was that of a new type of secondary school (in the form of a 7-form Real Gymnasium), free from corporal punishment, social privileges or restrictions, aimed at tutoring the students in the spirit of new, progressive ideas that were coming to Russia from Europe, while warning against mechanically copying Western educational schemes.

Contributing regularly to Biblioteka Dlya Chteniya, Istorichesky Vestnik, Syn Otechestva, Vestnik Evropy and Russkiy Mir (which he edited in 1859–1860) Stoyunin authored numerous reviews and literary essays, mostly on the history of Russian literature, in particular on the works and lives of Antiokh Kantemir, Alexander Sumarokov, Alexander Shishkov and Alexander Pushkin.

Stoyunin read Russian history, language and literature at (and was also a vice-president of) the private Stoyunina Gymnasium, which his wife Maria Nikolayevna had founded.

== Literature ==
- Boris Glinsky / Глинский Б. Б. Владимир Яковлевич Стоюнин // Исторический вестник, 1889. — Т. 35. — No. 2. — С. 413–444.
- Языков Д. Д. Учено-литературные труды В. Я. Стоюнина // Исторический вестник, 1889. — Т. 35. — No. 2. — С. 445–450.
- Витберг Ф. А. В. Я. Стоюнин, как педагог и человек: речь Ф. А. Витберга. — СПб., 1899. — 20 с.
