= Nikolai Albertini =

Russian journalist, lawyer, publicist and literary critic

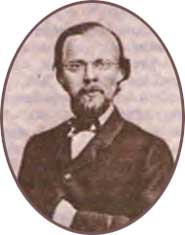
- Born: Николай Викентьевич Альбертини; August 12, 1826; Chernigov Governorate, Russian Empire
- Died: July 31, 1890 (aged 63); Saint Petersburg, Russian Empire
- Occupations: journalist, literary critic

Nikolai Vikentyevich Albertini (Russian: Никола́й Вике́нтьевич Альберти́ни; 12 August 1826 — 31 July 1890) was a Russian journalist, lawyer, publicist and literary critic.

== Biography ==
Nikolai Albertini was born in Oster, in the Chernigov Governorate of the Russian Empire, into the family of a minor state official. His father, a son of the composer and conductor Vicenzo Albertini, was of Italian and Polish descent, his mother (née Korkunova) was Russian.

A Moscow 3rd Gymnasium graduate (1846), Albertini enrolled into the Moscow University to study law, and after the graduation in 1851 went on to teach jurisprudence at the 2nd Moscow Cadet Corps, which he did until 1859. In 1857 Albertini started writing for Otechestvennye Zapiski where his monthly Political Reviews made him both popular and controversial author. A staunch Anglophile who considered Great Britain a perfect model for Russia's political and economic development, Albertini was harshly criticised by radicals like Nikolai Chernyshevsky and Dmitry Pisarev, whom he habitually defended in his polemics with the conservative press. He had clashes, though, with Nikolai Dobrolyubov, on the latter's series of articles "From Turin", as well as with Grigory Blagosvetlov, on the latter's English reports. A moderate liberal, Albertini was deeply interested in the revolutionary movement and maintained strong links with Russian radicals abroad. In 1862 in London he had talks with Alexander Hertzen and regularly corresponded with Nikolai Ogaryov, who insisted that he'd 'make peace' with his Russian critics (as well as Mikhail Bakunin) 'in the name of our common cause'.

In 1866 Albertini was arrested among the group of authors involved in the (Hertzen-related) so-called 'Heidelberg Reading-room Case' and was deported, without trial, to the Arkhangelsk region. In 1872 he was allowed to move to Revel and worked there for a while for the local governor's chancellery. After the return to Saint Petersburg he joined the Foreign Ministry office and became a regular contributor to Golos newspaper where his front page reviews under the Daily Topics headline appeared on a daily basis for three years. After Golos was shut down in 1883 Albertini worked for Novoye Vremya. He died in 1890 and is interred in Voskresensky Novodevichy monastery in Saint Petersburg.
