= Grigory Gradovsky =

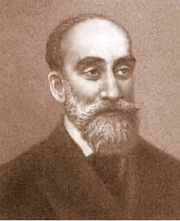
- Born: Григорий Константинович Градовский; October 31, 1842; Kherson Governorate, Imperial Russia
- Died: April 13, 1915 (aged 72); Petrograd, Imperial Russia
- Occupations: journalist, publicist, lawyer

Grigory Konstantinovich Gradovsky (Russian: Григорий Константинович Градовский, 31 October 1842, Kherson Governorate, Russian Empire, — 13 April 1915, Petrograd, Imperial Russia) was a Russian journalist, essayist, publicist and publisher.

A Kiev University graduate, Gradovsky contributed first to Kievsky Telegraf and Kievlyanin, later to Golos (where his popular Sunday feuilletons were published under the pseudonym Galin), Moskovskiye Vedomosti, Russkiy Mir and Molva. In the early 1870s for a short while he was the editor of Grazhdanin, a magazine published by the Dostoyevsky brothers.

In 1876 he started to publish his own newspaper Russkoye Obozrenye. After eleven warnings and three suspensions it was closed by the authorities in 1878, and Gradovsky went to the Turkish War as a war correspondent for Golos. Two books which collected his frontline reports and essays, The War in Asia Minor in 1877 (1878) and M.D. Skobelev. An Etude of Our Times and Its Heroes (1884, later translated into German), caused much controversy for seemingly aiming to undermine General Skovelev's high standing as a popular hero and nationalistic emblem the time.

Another scandal was caused by his 1884 Voskhod-published essay "On the Jewish Question" (К еврейскому вопросу) in which he criticised the Russian government's repressive policy towards the Jews. In 1895, alongside Nikolay Mikhaylovsky, Konstantin Arsenyev, Andrey Beketov, Vasily Bilbasov and Semyon Vengerov among others, he launched the campaign for freedom of speech and the liberalisation of the press legislation. In 1896 he sent a personal letter to Konstantin Pobedonostsev, trying to make him see the necessity of establishing the principles of free press in Russia.

He authored two dramas, Stary liberal (Старый либерал, Old Liberal) and Vo imya lyubvi (Во имя любви, In the Name of Love), both published in 1907.

Gradovsky's daughter Yekaterina, a journalist too, was the wife of Vasily Shulgin.
