= Varfolomey Zaytsev =

Russian journalist and critic (1842–1882)

- Варфоломей Зайцев
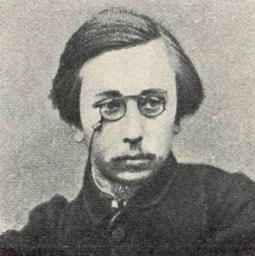
- Born: 11 September 1842; Moscow, Russian Empire
- Died: 20 January 1882 (aged 39); Clarens, Switzerland
- Occupations: Literary critic, essayist, journalist, translator, historian
- Years active: 1863–1882
- Movement: Russian nihilist movement

Varfolomey Alexandrovich Zaytsev (Russian: Варфоломей Александрович Зайцев; 11 September 1842 – 20 January 1882) was a Russian literary critic, historian, journalist, and publicist. He was a leading figure of the Russian nihilist movement in literary publication of his time.

== Career ==
Arguably the most ardent and confrontational author of Russkoye Slovo in 1863—1865, Zaytsev propagated the 'negation of aesthetics' doctrine, panned Alexey Pisemsky's and Nikolai Leskov's anti-nihilistic novels and published critical essays which were "not dry and dour book reviews but fiery propaganda in the form of literary criticism... written with blood from open heart and juices of nerves," according to the critic and fellow Social Democrat Nikolai Shelgunov. It was Zaytsev who chose to take Saltykov-Shchedrin's remark concerning Chernyshevsky's novel What Is to Be Done as a pretext for instigating the long and bitter feud with Sovremennik which came to be known (via Dostoyevsky) as 'the break among the nihilists'.

In 1866 after Dmitry Karakozov's attempt at the life of the Tsar, Zaytsev was arrested and spent several months in the Petropavlovskaya Fortress. In 1869 he left Russia and, having veered towards the anarchists and Mikhail Bakunin in particular, launched the Italian section of the 1st International in Turin. Later in his life he veered towards the revolutionary narodniks and became friends with Georgy Plekhanov, Vera Zasulich and Sergey Stepnyak-Kravchinsky.

Zaytsev contributed to such publications as the Geneva-based Obshcheye Delo (Common Cause, where more than 80 of his articles appeared which earned him the reputation of "Russian Rochefort") and Kolokol in London, as well as Delo and Otechestvennye Zapiski back in Russia.

In the 1870s Zaytsev's main subject of interest became history; the two compilations on the ancient history (Руководство всемирной истории: древняя история Востока, 1879; Руководство всемирной истории: древняя история Запада 1882) have won him scholarly acclaim. Among the books he translated were Litteratur u. Kultur im 19 Jahrhundert by Johann Jakob Honegger, The Works by Ferdinand Lassalle (1870), Ippolito Nievo's Confessions of an Italian (1875), James Guillaume's Anarchy According to Proudhon (1874), Denis Diderot's Novels and Novellas in 2 volumes (1872). Starting with volume 3 he succeeded Nikolai Chernyshevsky as a translation editor of the World History by Friedrich Christoph Schlosser (1861—1868).

The Selected Works by V.A. Zaytsev came out in Moscow, USSR, in 1934.
