= Golos (newspaper) =

Russian political and literary newspaper

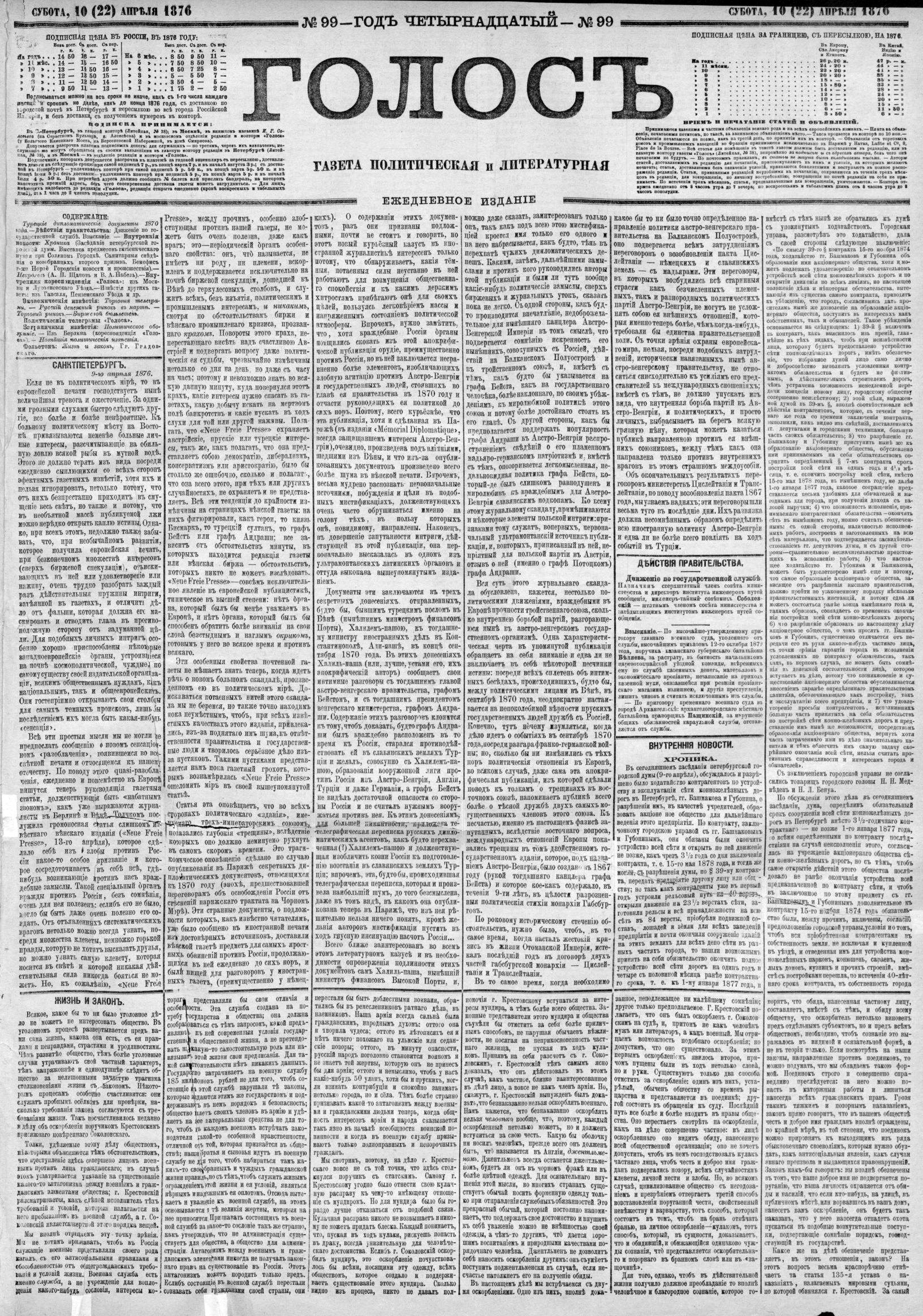
- Edition of April 10th, 1876
- Type: Weekly newspaper
- Publisher: Andrey Krayevsky
- Editor: Andrey Krayevsky; Vasily Bilbasov
- Founded: 1863
- Ceased publication: 1885
- Headquarters: Saint Petersburg, Russian Empire
- Circulation: 22,630 (1877)

Golos (Russian: Голос, Voice) was a Russian political and literary newspaper, edited and published in Saint Petersburg in 1863–1885 by Andrey Krayevsky. One of the most successful Russian newspapers of the 19th century (its circulation in 1877 reached 22,630 and was rising), Golos supported the liberal capitalist reforms in Russia. In its first five years the newspaper received 11 official warnings and 3 bans, one of which resulted in a six-month gap. The newspaper's major contributors were Vasily Bilbasov (since 1871 its editor-in-chief), Alexey Pleshcheyev, Nikolai Albertini, Vladimir Bezobrazov, Vasily Modestov, Evgeny Markov, Pyotr Yefremov, Lev Panyutin, Grigory Gradovsky, Alexander Gradovsky, Vladimir Zotov, Pyotr Nechayev, Arseny Vvedensky, Leonid Polonsky and Feofil Tolstoy, among others.
