= Gafur Rashad Mirzazade =

- Qafur Rəşad Mirzəzadə
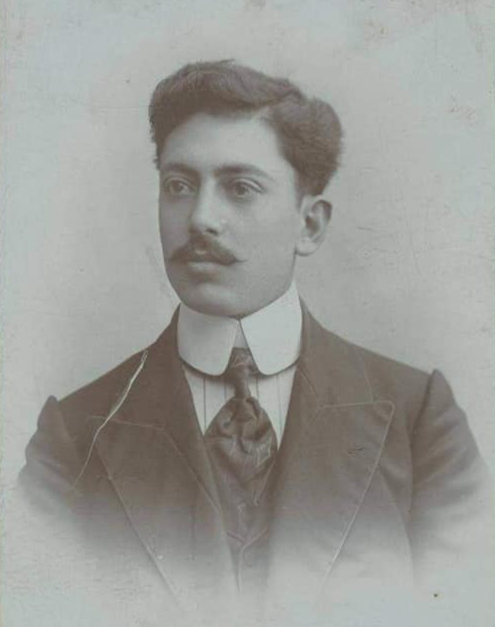
- Born: Qafur Ələkbər oğlu Mirzəzadə; May 6, 1884; Shamakhi, Baku Governorate, Russian Empire
- Died: November 27, 1943 (aged 59); Baku, Azerbaijan SSR, Soviet Union
- Occupations: Geographer, educator, pedagogue, publisher, journalist, translator
- Known for: Geography textbooks, co-founder of Mekteb magazine

Gafur Rashad Mirzazade (full name: Gafur Alakbar oghlu Mirzazade; 6 May 1884 – 27 November 1943) was an Azerbaijani geographer, educator, pedagogue, publisher, journalist, and translator. He was one of the early contributors to geography education in Azerbaijan and the author of several school textbooks.

== Early life and education ==
Gafur Rashad Mirzazade was born in Shamakhi, then part of the Baku Governorate, Russian Empire. He received his early education at a local religious school before attending the six-year city school in Shamakhi.

Later, he studied at the Higher Pedagogical Institute (1920–1922) and graduated from the economics faculty of the Azerbaijan Polytechnic Institute in 1927.

== Career ==
Mirzazade began his teaching career in 1902 in the village of Lahij, where he worked for five years. He promoted literacy among both children and adults, organizing evening classes for local residents.

In 1907, he moved to Baku and taught in teacher-training courses organized by the Nashri-Maarif society. During the period of the Azerbaijan Democratic Republic, he was appointed to teach national subjects at the Second Real School. During the Soviet period, he worked at Azerbaijan State University, the Transcaucasian Cotton Institute, the Industrial Academy, the Industrial Institute, and the Azerbaijan State Scientific Research Institute.

== Works ==
Mirzazade was among the pioneers of geography textbooks in Azerbaijani. His works included:

- Geography of the Caucasus (1910)
- Elementary Geography (1922)
- General Geography (1923)
- Dictionary of Geographical Terms (1923)
- Economic Geography of the USSR (1941)
- Practical Work on the Map (1943)

In total, he published 18 textbooks and teaching manuals.

Mirzazade is regarded as one of the creators of the first geography textbooks in Azerbaijan.

He also co-authored grammar and arithmetic textbooks, including Rahbari-sarf and Rahbari-hesab, which were used in schools for many years.

Mirzazade was one of the founders, together with Abdurrahman Afandizade, of Mekteb (lit. 'School'), an Azerbaijani children's magazine first published in 1911. The magazine played an important role in the development of children's literature and modern educational thought in Azerbaijan.

He also translated works by Leo Tolstoy and Pyotr Polevoy into Azerbaijani.

== Later years and death ==
Mirzazade died on 27 November 1943 in Baku at the age of 59.
