= Pyotr Bykov =

Russian poet (1844–1930)

Pyotr Vasilyevich Bykov
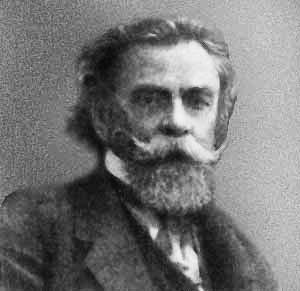
- Born: Пётр Васильевич Быков; November 1, 1844; Sevastopol, Crimea, Russian Empire
- Died: October 22, 1930 (aged 85); Detskoye Selo, USSR
- Occupations: literary historian, editor, poet, writer, translator
- Years active: 1860-1920s

Pyotr Vasilyevich Bykov (Пётр Васильевич Быков, 1 November 1844, Sevastopol, Crimea, Russian Empire – 22 October 1930, Detskoye Selo, Leningrad, USSR) was a Russian literary historian, editor, poet and translator.

A University of Kharkiv alumnus, Bykov moved to Saint Petersburg in the early 1860s and started writing short stories, poems and bibliographical articles, published in Syn Otechestva, Russkiy Mir, Iskra, Otechestvennye Zapiski. Later Bykov edited Delo (1880), Russkoye Bogatstvo (1881–1900), Vsemirnaya Illyustratsia (literary section, 1891–1898), Slovo newspaper (1904–1905) and Sovremennik (1911).

Among the translations Bykov made in 1870s-1900s were those of the works by William Shakespeare, Victor Hugo, Heinrich Heine, Theophile Gautier and Wladyslaw Syrokomla.

Bykov compiled and published numerous The Complete Works series, including those by Yulia Zhadovskaya (1885), Alexey Koltsov (1892), Alexander Afanasyev-Chuzhbinsky (1890), Mikhail Lermontov (1891, 1904), Heinrich Heine (1900), Alexey Pleshcheyev (1896–1897, 1905), Nikolai Gogol (1909), Moliere (1909), Ilya Salov (1910–1912), Pyotr Polevoy (1911–1912), Lev Mey (1911), Anton Chekhov (1911), Mikhail Mikhaylov (1912), Fyodor Tyutchev (1912), Dmitry Mamin-Sibiryak (1915–1917). The number of biographical articles and essays authored by Bykov exceeds one thousand.
