= Russian Fairy Tales (disambiguation) =

Russian Fairy Tales, or Russian Folk Tales may refer to:

- Russian fairy tale (skazka), generally
- Any story from the Folklore of Russia
- Some forms of Russian bylina, a traditional oral epic poem
- Narodnye russkie skazki (Russian Folk Tales), collected c.1850 by Alexander Afanasyev, including various modern English translation collections

== Various English translations ==
- Russian Fairy Tales, R.Nisbet Bain's 1892 translation from Pyotr Polevoy's extracts from Afanasyev's tales
- Old Peter's Russian Tales, collection of Russian folk-tales in English by Arthur Ransome
- Russian Folk Tales, (1873) translated by William Ralston Shedden-Ralston, from various Russian sources
- The Russian Fairy Book, by Nathan Haskell Dole (1907)
- The Russian Garland of Fairy Tales, (1916) unattributed translations by Robert Steele
- Russian Fairy Tales, (1919) translated by A. Brylinska from various Russian sources
