= Zhivopisnoe obozrenie =

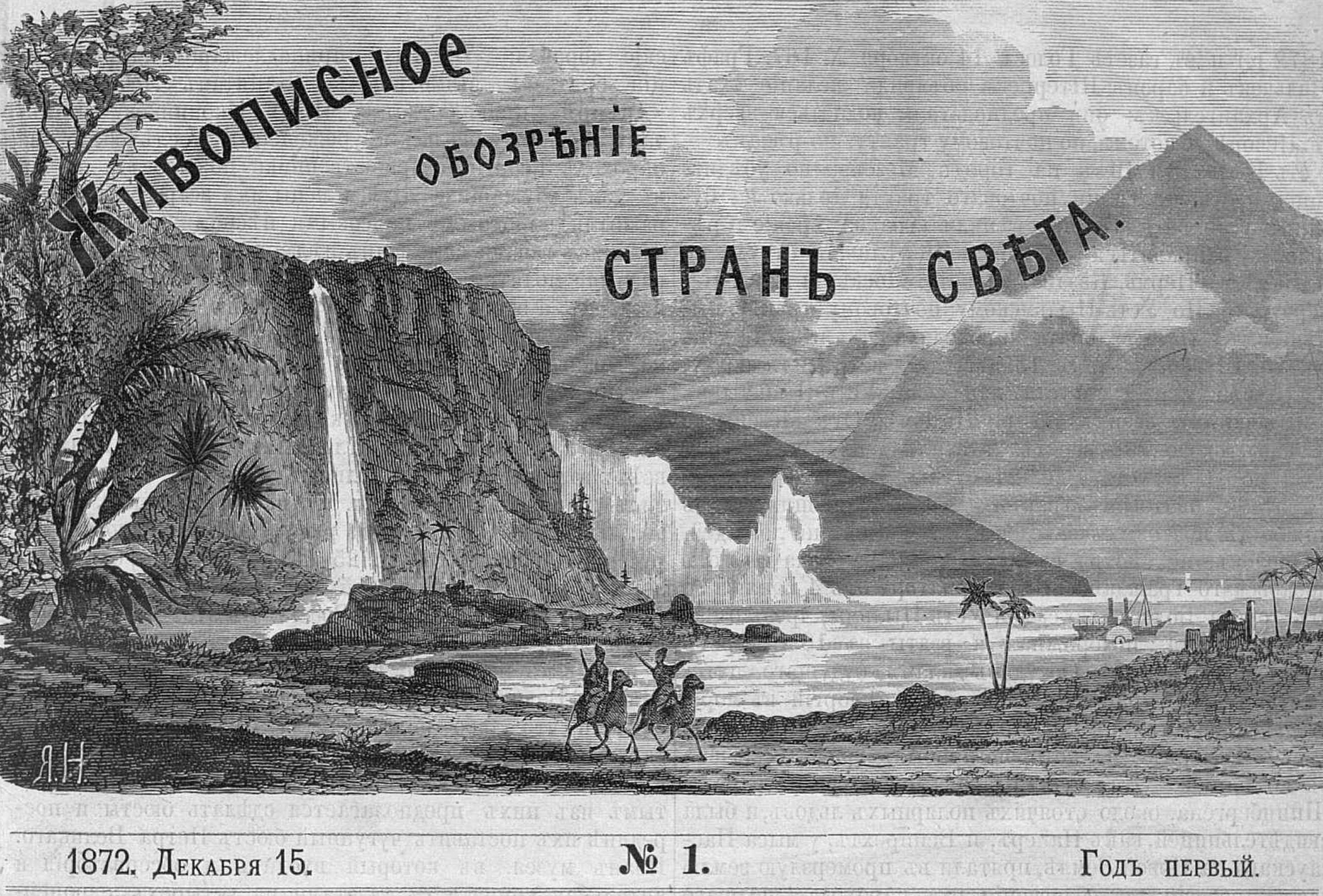
- Editor: Nikita Zuev, Pyotr Polevoy, Pyotr Bykov, Ignaty Potapenko
- Frequency: Weekly
- Founded: 1872
- Final issue: 1905
- Based in: Saint Petersburg, Russian Empire
- Language: Russian

Zhivopisnoe obozrenie (Russian: Живописное обозрение, Pictorial Review) was a Russian illustrated weekly magazine published in Saint Petersburg from 1872 to 1900 and 1902 to 1905.

The first issue of Zhivopisnoe obozrenie stran sveta (Foreign lands' pictorial review), as it was originally called, was published on 15 December 1872, edited by the cartographer scholar Nikita Zuev. After D.A. Karch-Karchevsky took over in 1875, the publication's title was shortened and it now had a literary section. In the following years the magazine's editors were Nikolai Shulgin (1880–1882), Pyotr Polevoy (1882–1885), Sergey Dobrodeyev (1885–1900), Pyotr Bykov, A.P. Nestor and Ignaty Potapenko (1902–1905).

The original Review, subtitled "Illustrated journal of travelling, expeditions, et cetera," contained mostly original and translated articles on popular ethnography and geography, while focusing on high-quality illustrations. In 1875 it cut the natural sciences section to a minimum and became just 'Illustrated journal', with emphasis now on literature and poetry, publishing essays on serious art (Viktor Vasnetsov, Konstantin Makovsky, Ilya Repin, among others).

Among the authors whose works appeared regularly in the magazine were Alexander Sheller-Mikhaylov, Yakov Polonsky, Konstantin Fofanov, Konstantin Balmont, Dmitry Mamin-Sibiryak, Vasily Nemirovich-Danchenko, Ignaty Potapenko and Fyodor Sologub. Several translations of prominent foreign authors (Alphonse Daudet, Bret Harte, Anatole France and others) were first published in Zhivopisnoe obozrenie.
