= Eleninsky Institute =

Women's school in St. Petersburg, Russia (1821–1918)

Petersburg Institute of St. Helena
- Петербургский институт Святой Елены
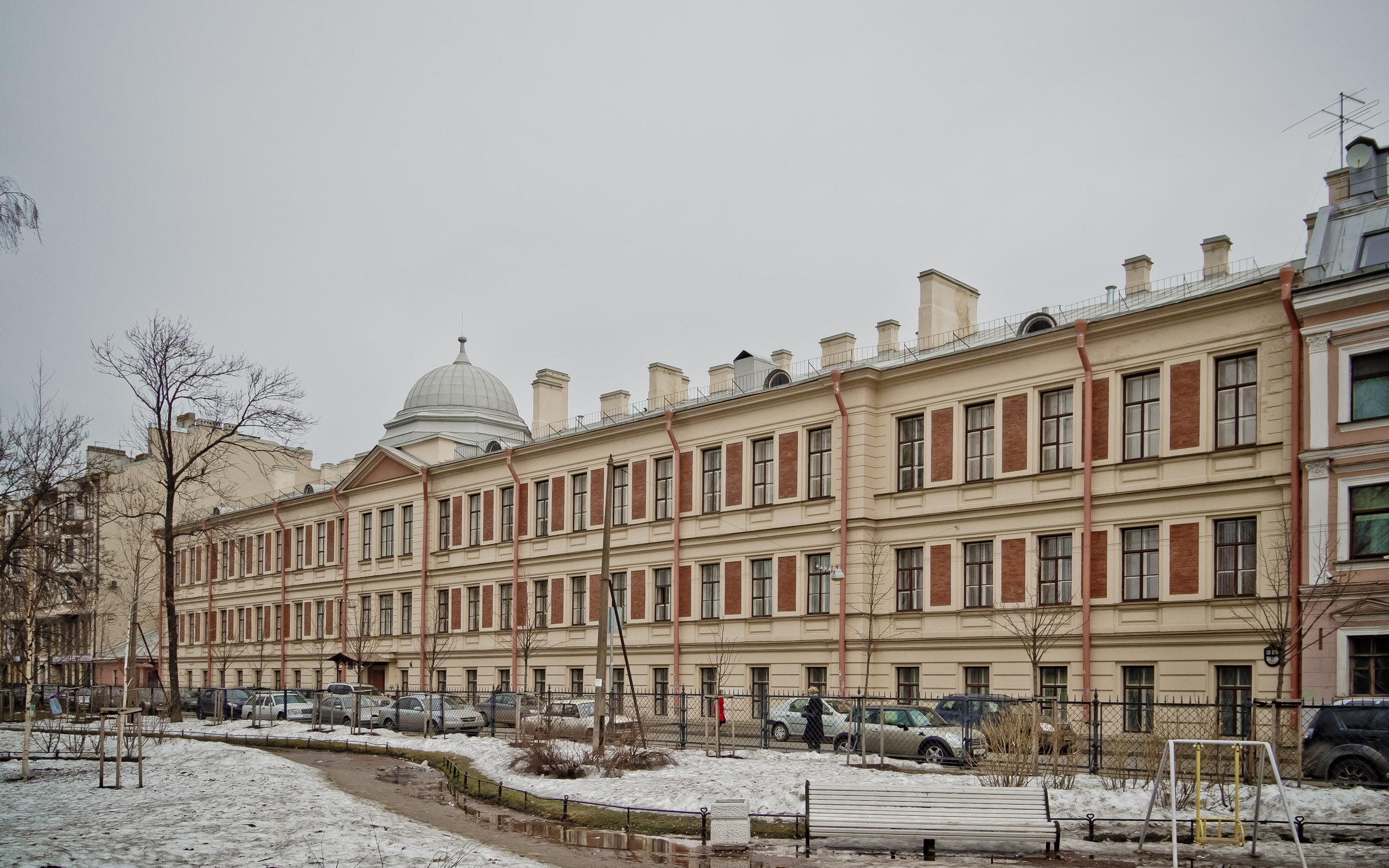
- Active: 1821–1918
- Location: Saint Petersburg, Russia
- Language: Russian

Petersburg Institute of St. Helena (Russian: Петербургский институт Святой Елены) is a closed women's educational institution of the Russian Empire, part of the department of institutions of Empress Maria, which existed from 1821 to 1918 in St. Petersburg.

== History ==
On 5 October 1821, by decree of Emperor Alexander I and with the assistance of Empress Maria Feodorovna, the School for Mutual Education according to the Lancaster system was created at the St. Petersburg Orphanage, created to educate children of both sexes. The first head of the school was a student of Joseph Lancaster, Sarah Kilgum. Education at the school was carried out according to the Bell-Lancaster system. In the structure of the School, two departments were created: male and female, in total there were one hundred and forty children of both sexes. The main subjects of study at the School were arithmetic, writing and reading. In 1830, after the death of Empress Maria Feodorovna, Grand prince Elena Pavlovna took the School under her patronage.

In 1855, a building was purchased for the School, which belonged to the previously famous writer Ivan Krylov on the Petersburg side at Tserkovnaya Street, 29, in 1851, rebuilt and expanded by the architect N. P. Grebyonka. From 1871 to 1872, the building underwent a superstructure under the guidance of the architect N.F. Montandra, and in 1898 to 1900 the task was rebuilt under the guidance of the architect A.I. Shambacher and with the participation of the architects N.I. Poleshko and F.B. Nagel. In 1898, the house Church of the Holy Equal-to-the-Apostles Constantine and Helena was built, and on 2 February 1901, it was consecrated by Metropolitan Anthony in the presence of Empress Maria Feodorovna. The shroud and icons for the church were painted by the painterCarl Timoleon von Neff.

On 20 November 1854, Emperor Nicholas I, at the request of Grand prince Elena Pavlovna, signed a Decree on renaming the School of Mutual Education into the School of St. Helena, in honor of the heavenly patroness of the School - the Holy Equal-to-the-Apostles Empress Elena, from that moment on, the School becomes a closed women's educational institution, part of the department of institutions Empress Maria. On 5 February 1865 and 7 March 1878 Emperor Alexander II visited the School. On 27 July 1880, the Charter of the educational institution was adopted, according to which the School was transformed into the Institute of St. Helena, becoming an educational institution of the 2nd category. About one hundred and seventy pupils from poor families of all classes studied at the institute on a full board basis. The main subjects of study at the institute were: natural history, pedagogy, foreign languages, Russian language and literature, hygiene, music, dancing and gymnastics. In 1901, the institute began issuing diplomas of home tutors to its graduates. In 1910, the institute received the official right to be called a women's institute, and its pupils, who successfully completed the course of study, acquired the right to receive a golden cipher.

Over the years, the teaching staff of the institute was made up of well-known people in their fields: the educational part was headed by K. K. Arngeim, the history was headed by V. A. Butenko, the musical part was headed by Mily Balakirev, F. A. Kanille and E. S. Azeev, the teacher was V. G. Pevtsov. Vladimir Stoyunin and the well-known lawyer Anatoly Koni, who wrote the draft Charter of the institute, were members of the Council of the institute. The well-known writer Vladimir Odoyevsky was an assistant in the management of the institute.

In 1918, after the October Revolution and the advent of the new government, the Eleninsky Institute was closed. On the basis of the institute, the Unified Soviet Labor School No. 199 was created with a boarding school No. 3 named after Nikolay Dobrolyubov. At the moment, the former building of the institute houses the Secondary School No. 77 with an in-depth study of chemistry in the Petrograd region.

== Notable people ==
=== Directors ===
- Biller, Sara Alexandrovna (1821-1844)
- Titova, Anna Mikhailovna (1844-1877)
- Vansovich, Ekaterina Alexandrovna (1877-1905)
- Arnoldi, Varvara Dmitrievna (1905-1917)

=== Patrons ===
- Grand prince Elena Pavlovna
- Grand prince Ekaterina Mikhailovna

=== Teachers ===
- Geek, Nikolai Karlovich
- Arnheim, Karl Karlovich
- Butenko, Vadim Apollonovich
- Kedrov, Konstantin Vasilievich
- Mily Balakirev
- Azeev, Evstafiy Stepanovich
- Pevtsov, Vasily Gerasimovich
- Canille, Fedor Andreevich

=== Trustees ===
- Duchess Helene of Mecklenburg-Strelitz

== Literature ==
- Санкт-Петербург. Петроград. Ленинград: Энциклопедический справочник / Белова Л. Н., Булдаков Г. Н., Дегтярев А. Я. и др.; Москва: Great Russian Encyclopedia, 1992. — 687 с.
- История народного образования в Российской империи в архивных документах, 1802—1917 гг.: справочник / Д.И. Раскин; Санкт-Петербургский государственный университет (СПбГУ): Санкт-Петербург: 2020. — 1068 с.
- Начальное и среднее образование в Санкт-Петербурге XIX — начало XX века : Сб. док. / Арх. упр. Санкт-Петербурга и Ленингр. обл. Центр. гос. ист. арх. Санкт-Петербурга (ЦГИАСПБ); Сост. Н. Ф. Никольцева. - Санкт-Петербург : Лики России, 2000. — 359 с. — ISBN 5-87417-096-0
- Закрытые женские институты Российской империи. 1764—1855 / Пономарева В.В., изд: Пятый Рим Москва: 2019. ISBN 978-5-6043327-2-6

== Sources ==
- "Училище св. Елены. — Еленинское училище — Женский институт св. Елены". Архитектурный сайт Санкт-Петербурга.
- "Училище святой Елены". Санкт-Петербургская школа No. 77.
