= Russkoye Slovo =

Russian weekly magazine published from 1859 to 1866

- Frequency: Weekly
- First issue: 1859
- Final issue: 1866
- Based in: Saint Petersburg, Russian Empire
- Language: Russian

Russkoye Slovo (Русское слово, Russian Word) was a Russian weekly magazine published in Saint Petersburg in 1859–1866 by its owner, Count Grigory Kushelev-Bezborodko.

== History ==
The magazine's first editors were Yakov Polonsky, Apollon Grigoryev, and A.Khmelnitsky. In mid-1860 Grigory Blagosvetlov came in, to invite several new authors, including Dmitry Pisarev who became the head of the literary criticism section. Russkoye Slovo soon became quite popular among the young Russian intelligentsia. In 1862, after the publication of Pisarev's essay "Poor Russian Thought" (Бедная русская мысль), the magazine received half a year suspension.

While Sovremennik (with Nikolai Dobrolyubov and Nikolai Chernyshevsky as its ideological leaders) represented the deeper, analytical part of the same spectrum, for Russkoye Slovo the straightforward, often nihilistic protest was the order of the day. Some attacks on liberal literature and arts published in the journal were criticized even by its Sovremennik allies.

Polemic essays by Pisarev, Varfolomey Zaytsev, Nikolai Shelgunov, Afanasy Shchapov represented the facade of Russkoye Slovo. The prose section behind it was less impressive: the main contributors to it were Nikolai Bazhin and Nikolai Blagoveshchensky as well as (occasionally) Marko Vovchok, Alexander Levitov, Alexander Sheller, Nikolai Pomyalovsky, Fyodor Reshetnikov, Konstantin Staniukovich and Gleb Uspensky.

After the 1866 Karakozov's assassination attempt Russkoye Slovo (as well as Sovremennik) was closed by a monarch's decree.
