= Prozorov =

Prozorov (masculine) or Prozorova (feminine) is a Russian surname (Russian: Прозоров) and may refer to:

- Leonid Polonsky (1833–1913), Russian author and publisher who used the moniker Prozorov
- Mikhail Prozorov, architect who designed many buildings in Vilnius, including Alexander Nevsky Church
- Nikolai Prozorov, executed priest canonized by the Russian Orthodox Church in 1981; see August 6 (Eastern Orthodox liturgics)
- Olga, Marina, Irina, and Andrei Sergeyevich Prozorov, three sisters and their brother in Chekhov's 1901 play Three Sisters
- Tatiana Prozorova (b. 2003), Russian tennis player

== See also ==
- Prozorovsky, Russian noble family
