= Vasily Modestov =

Russian historian, philologist, publicist and translator

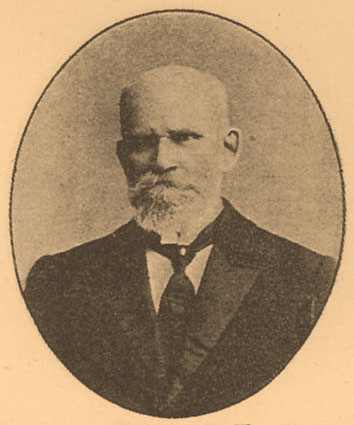
- Born: January 24, 1839; Novgorod Governorate, Russian Empire
- Died: February 13, 1907 (aged 68); Rome, Italy
- Occupation(s): historian, philologist, publicist and translator

Vasily Ivanovich Modestov (Russian: Василий Иванович Модестов, 24 January 1839, Valday, Novgorod Governorate, Imperial Russia, — 13 February 1907, Rome, Italy) was a Russian historian, philologist, publicist and translator.

A Saint Petersburg University graduate who lectured at the Odessa, Kazan and Kiev Universities, as well as his alma mater (in 1886—1889), Modestov was a prominent authority on the history and culture of Ancient Rome, as well as earlier Apennine Peninsula cultures (Etruscan civilization, Messapii). He contributed to Istorichesky Vestnik, Golos, Nov, Filologicheskoye Obozrenye, as well as the Brockhaus and Efron Encyclopedic Dictionary, providing entries on the history and culture of Rome. Modestov translated into Russian semimal works by Tacitus (The Complete Tacitus, Vols. 1—2, 1886—87), Horace, Spinoza, as well as the Reallexikon des classischen Alterthums für Gymnasien. Among his best-known original works were The History of Ancient Rome (Vols. I-II, 1902—1909) and Tacitus and his Work. Historical and Literary Study (Тацит и его сочинения. Историко-литературное исследование, 1864).
