= Grigory Blagosvetlov =

Russian journalist, literary critic, essayist and editor

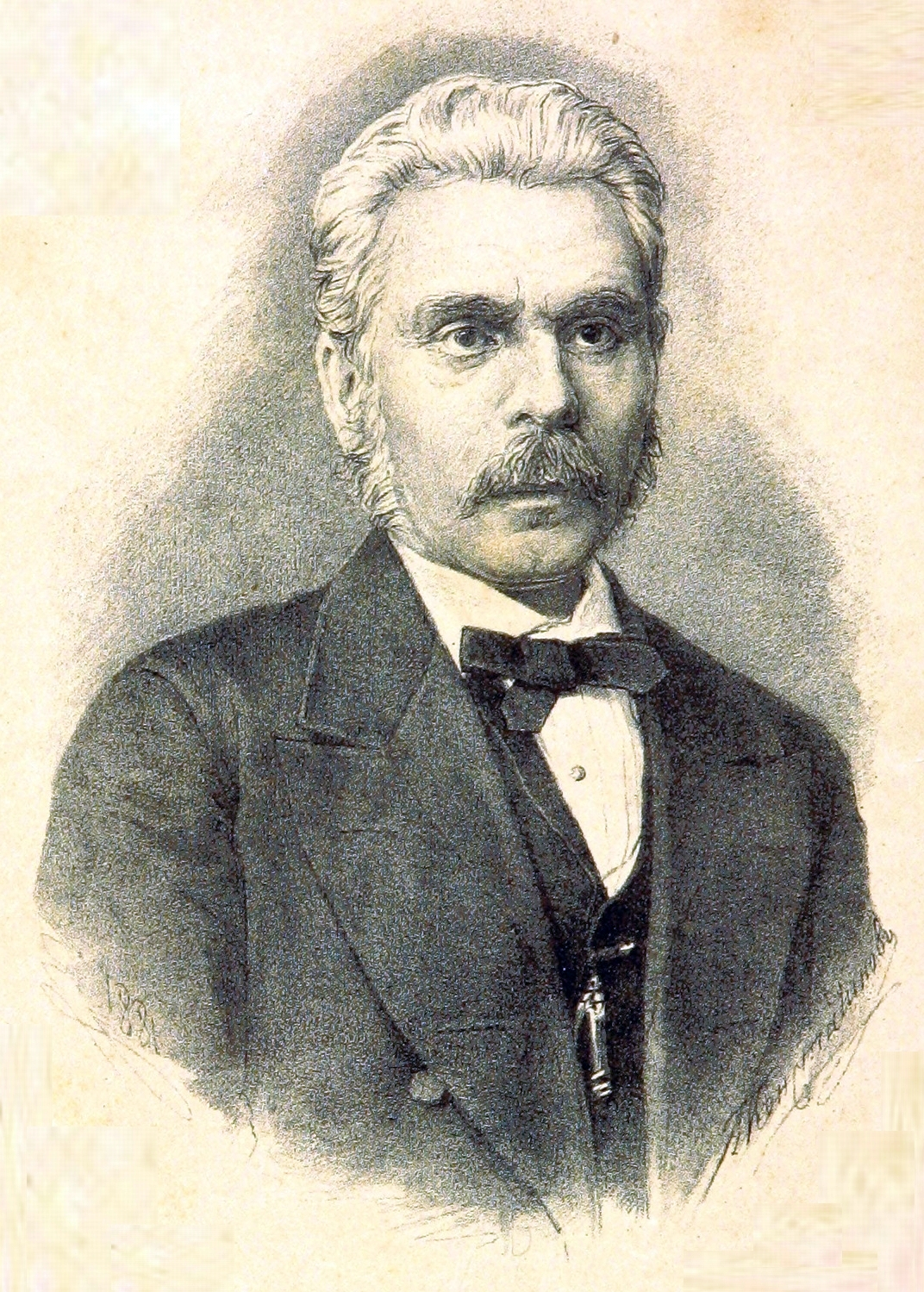
- Born: Григорий Евлампиевич Благосветлов; August 13, 1824; Stavropol, Imperial Russia
- Died: November 19, 1880 (aged 56); Saint Petersburg, Imperial Russia
- Occupation: journalist • critic • editor

Grigory Evlampievich Blagosvetlov (Russian: Григорий Евлампиевич Благосветлов; 13 August 1824 – 19 November 1880) was a Russian journalist, literary critic, essayist and editor.

A Saint Petersburg University graduate, Blagosvetlov debuted as a published author in 1849 (Severnoye Obozrenye, No.2) with an essay called "Karamzin as a Shakespearean scholar and translator". He went on to teach, first at the Page Corps, then at the Pavlovsky Institute, which he was expelled from after his links with the Petrashevsky Circle had been exposed. In 1857-1860 Blagosvetlov visited several West European countries and, staying in Britain, contributed to Kolokol, published by Alexander Hertzen, whose daughter he was the tutor of at the time.

In 1860 Blagosvetlov started editing Russkoye Slovo which in 1862 was shut down by the authorities. After a restart, Count Grigory Kushelev-Bezborodko entrusted his publisher's rights to Blagosvetlov and the latter invited Dmitry Pisarev, Varfolomey Zaytsev and Nikolai Shelgunov (among others) to the publication which started quickly to gain popularity among the young intelligentsia, to soon become one of the two (alongside Nikolai Nekrasov's Otechestvennye Zapiski) most radical Russian journals of the time. After the final closure of Russkoye Slovo, Blagosvetlov went on to edit Delo.
