= Grigory Kushelev-Bezborodko =

Russian writer, publisher and philanthropist

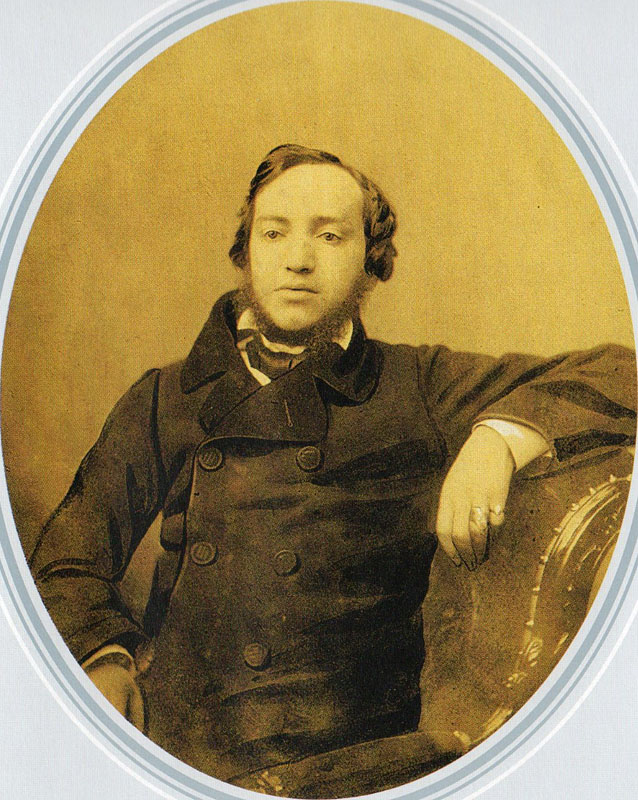
- Kushelev-Bezborodko in 1850s
- Born: Григорий Александрович Кушелев-Безбородко; January 2, 1832; Saint Petersburg, Imperial Russia
- Died: May 13, 1870 (aged 38); Saint Petersburg, Imperial Russia
- Occupations: writer, publisher, philanthropist

Count Grigory Alexandrovich Kushelev-Bezborodko (Russian: Григорий Александрович Кушелев-Безбородко; 1 February 1832 – 13 May 1870) was a Russian writer, publisher and philanthropist.

Kushelev-Bezborodko started out in the early 1850s as a writer who contributed short stories and sketches to Otechestvennye Zapiski, Pantheon, Molva and Russkoye Slovo. In 1856 he started to edit the latter, then four years later passed all the publishing rights to Grigory Blagosvetlov, along with all the printing facilities as a free gift, to concentrate on entrepreneurial work and literary philanthropy.

In 1858 Kushelev-Bezborodko invited Alexandre Dumas to make a trip over Russia and received him as a guest at his dacha in Polyustrovo. In 1861 he visited Alexander Hertsen in London and two years later donated a large sum of money to the Common Fund (Общий фонд) which had been set to help the Russians abroad. Ignatz Kolisch was considered his secretary. He built the Château de la Roche (Annesse-et-Beaulieu) for his wife.

Among the several major publications that he financed back in Russia were the 1858 poetry collection by Apollon Maykov, the first edition of The Works by Alexander Ostrovsky (1859), as well as The Complete Lev Mey (1862–1863) in three volumes. His own literary work was collected first in the Sketches and Stories by Gritsko Grigorenko (1857) and later in the Sketches, Stories, Traveler Notes collection.

Famous Polish pianist and composer Anton de Kontski piece La dolce rimembranza, Op. 158 (ca.1856) to Kushelev-Bezborodko.
