= Lev Panyutin =

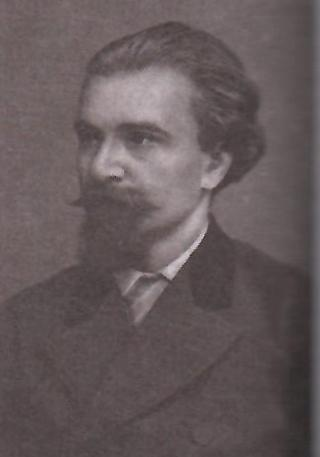
- Born: Лев Константинович Панютин; March 6, 1831; Yelisavetgradsky Uyezd, Kherson Governorate, Imperial Russia
- Died: December 13, 1882 (aged 51); Saint Petersburg, Imperial Russia
- Occupations: writer, poet, critic, journalist

Lev Konstantinovich Panyutin (Russian: Лев Константинович Панютин; 6 March 1831 in Yelisavetgradsky Uyezd, Kherson Governorate, Imperial Russia – 13 December 1882 in Saint Petersburg, Imperial Russia) was a Russian writer, poet and journalist. Panyutin, who debuted as a published author in 1858 in Moscow with the Stikhotverenya (Poems) collection, then moved to Saint Petersburg where he started contributing to Golos, using the pseudonym Nil Admirari, and soon became a popular author of feuilletons which came out in 1872 as a separate two-volume edition. Panyutin was also writing stories, as well as critical and historical essays for Otechestvennye Zapiski, Nedelya and Budilnik.
