= Leonid Polonsky =

Russian journalist, editor, publisher and writer

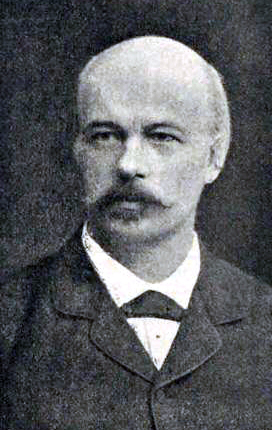
- Born: Леонид Александрович Полонский; 1833; Vilna Governorate, Imperial Russia
- Died: 1913 (aged 79–80); Saint Petersburg, Imperial Russia
- Occupations: journalist, writer

Leonid Alexandrovich Polonsky (Russian: Леонид Александрович Полонский, 1833 – 1913) was a Russian journalist, editor, publisher and writer who used numerous monikers, notably Lyubich, Lukyanov and Prozorov.

== Career ==
Polonsky started his career as a journalist as the head of the Foreign Policy section first in Russky Invalid (1861), then in Sovremennoye Slovo; with it he moved to Saint Peterburg's Vedomosti (1864–1865) and later revived it in Golos, Glasny Sud and Syn Otechestva. While working for Vedomosti, he launched the series of weekly 'about-the-town' satirical sketches (using the pseudonym Ivan Lyubich), which after his departure was taken up by first Viktor Burenin and later Alexey Suvorin.

His first success with the readership came with the Internal Affairs section in Vestnik Evropy which for twelve years (in 1868–1880) he was the head of. It was in this magazine that his two short novels came out, Nado zhit (Russian: Надо жить, lit. 'One has to live', 1878) and Sumashedshy muzykant (Russian: Сумасшедший музыкант, lit. 'Mad musician', 1879), signed L. Lukyanov.

In 1880 Polonsky started his own newspaper Strana (Country), which he was both the publisher and the editor of. A liberal publication, it criticised the Slavophile doctrine, polemicized with Rus and defended Chernyshevsky. Having received several warnings from the authorities, it was closed in 1884. In 1884-1892 Polonsky worked as the editor of the Internal Affairs section at Russkaya Mysl, where he also published his short novel Anna (1892). In 1893 he joined Severny Vestnik to edit several sections, including Provincial Press, under the pseudonym L. Prozorov.

Polonsky with his superb command of French, in 1881–1883 worked as a Russian correspondent for Temps newspaper. He also contributed the "Lettres de Russie" for the Paris-based Revue universelle, where he published his translations of Saltykov-Shchedrin's satires. In the late 1880s he started to write in Polish for the Petersburg-based Kraj newspaper, which he became more closely involved with in the mid-1890s. His essay Mickiewicz in Russian Literature appeared in the Mickiewicz Anthology, a supplement for Kraj. His own novel Nado zhit was translated into French by Mickiewicz's wife Celina and appeared in Revue Universelle.
