= Pyotr Nechayev =

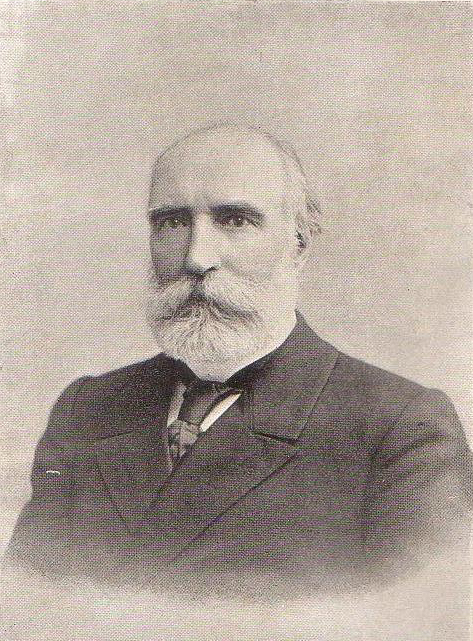
- Born: Пётр Иванович Нечаев; October 1, 1842; Tyosovo, Sychyovsky Uyezd, Smolensk Governorate, Imperial Russia
- Died: October 30, 1905 (aged 63); Saint Petersburg, Imperial Russia
- Occupations: religious writer, journalist, pedagogue
- Awards: The Makaryev Prize

Pyotr Ivanovich Nechayev (Russian: Пётр Ива́нович Неча́ев, 1 October 1842 – 30 October 1905) was a Russian religious writer, journalist, editor and pedagogue, a senior lecturer at the Saint Petersburg Theological Academy.

Born in Tyosovo, Sychyovsky Uyezd, Smolensk Governorate, to a local Russian Orthodox priest, Nechayev was educated at the Smolensk seminary and upon the graduation was sent with a stipend to the Saint Petersburg Theological Academy where he studied the Church history. In 1870 he was elected an Academy inspector and started teaching the Practical guidance for Priests, the new subject that prior to this had never had even textbooks in Russia. In 1884 he came up with exactly this, "The Practical Guidance for Priests" which was re-issued eight times in his lifetime. This, along with supplements, regulating Russian Orthodox priests' rights and duties, earned him the Makaryev Prize from the Russian Synod. It was the latter that he worked for, from 1888 up until his death in 1905, as its Educational committee's high-ranking official.

For most of his career as a lecturer at the Academy, Nechayev was a member of the stuff of Golos, the newspaper which he wrote regularly articles and reviews for, contributing also to the Strannik and Tserkovny vestnik magazines, as well as the Sovremennost newspaper, of which he was a one-time editor-in-chief.
