= Liberals Under Autocracy =

2012 book by Anton A. Fedyashin

Liberals Under Autocracy: Modernization and Civil Society in Russia, 1866–1904
- First edition
- Author: Anton A. Fedyashin
- Publisher: University of Wisconsin Press
- Publication date: 2012
- Pages: 282
- ISBN: 978-0-299-28434-3

Liberals Under Autocracy: Modernization and Civil Society in Russia, 1866–1904 is a book by Anton A. Fedyashin about Vestnik Evropy and Russian liberalism in the nineteenth century.

== Bibliography ==
- Ascher, Abraham (2013). "Review of Liberals under Autocracy: Modernization and Civil Society in Russia, 1866—1904". The American Historical Review. 118 (5): 1637–1638. doi:10.1093/ahr/118.5.1637. ISSN 0002-8762. JSTOR 23784754.
- Bradley, Joseph C. (2013). "Review of Liberals under Autocracy: Modernization and Civil Society in Russia, 1866-1904". The Russian Review. 72 (3): 512–513. ISSN 0036-0341. JSTOR 43661881.
- Deutschmann, Moritz (2013). "Liberals under Autocracy. Modernization and Civil Society in Russia, 1866–1904". European Review of History: Revue européenne d'histoire. 20 (5): 921–922. doi:10.1080/13507486.2013.832875. ISSN 1350-7486. S2CID 145090152.
- Emmons, Terence (2013). "Review of Liberals under Autocracy: Modernization and Civil Society in Russia, 1866–1904". Slavic Review. 72 (3): 650. doi:10.5612/slavicreview.72.3.0650. ISSN 0037-6779. JSTOR 10.5612/slavicreview.72.3.0650. S2CID 164635566.
- McReynolds, Louise (2013). "Review of Liberals under Autocracy: Modernization and Civil Society in Russia, 1866-1904". The Slavic and East European Journal. 57 (3): 480–481. ISSN 0037-6752. JSTOR 43857542.
- Owen, Catherine (2014-05-28). "Liberals under Autocracy. Modernization and Civil Society in Russia, 1866–1904". Europe-Asia Studies. 66 (5): 839–841. doi:10.1080/09668136.2014.912855. ISSN 0966-8136. S2CID 154598130.
- Raab, Nigel (2013). "Review of Liberals Under Autocracy: Modernization and Civil Society in Russia, 1866—1904". Canadian Slavonic Papers / Revue Canadienne des Slavistes. 55 (1/2): 266–267. ISSN 0008-5006. JSTOR 23617602.
- Waldron, Peter (2014). "Review of Liberals under Autocracy: Modernization and Civil Society in Russia, 1866–1904, Fedyashin, Anton A.". The Slavonic and East European Review. 92 (1): 151–153. doi:10.5699/slaveasteurorev2.92.1.0151. ISSN 0037-6795. JSTOR 10.5699/slaveasteurorev2.92.1.0151.
