= Vladimir Zotov =

Russian writer, playwright, journalist and editor

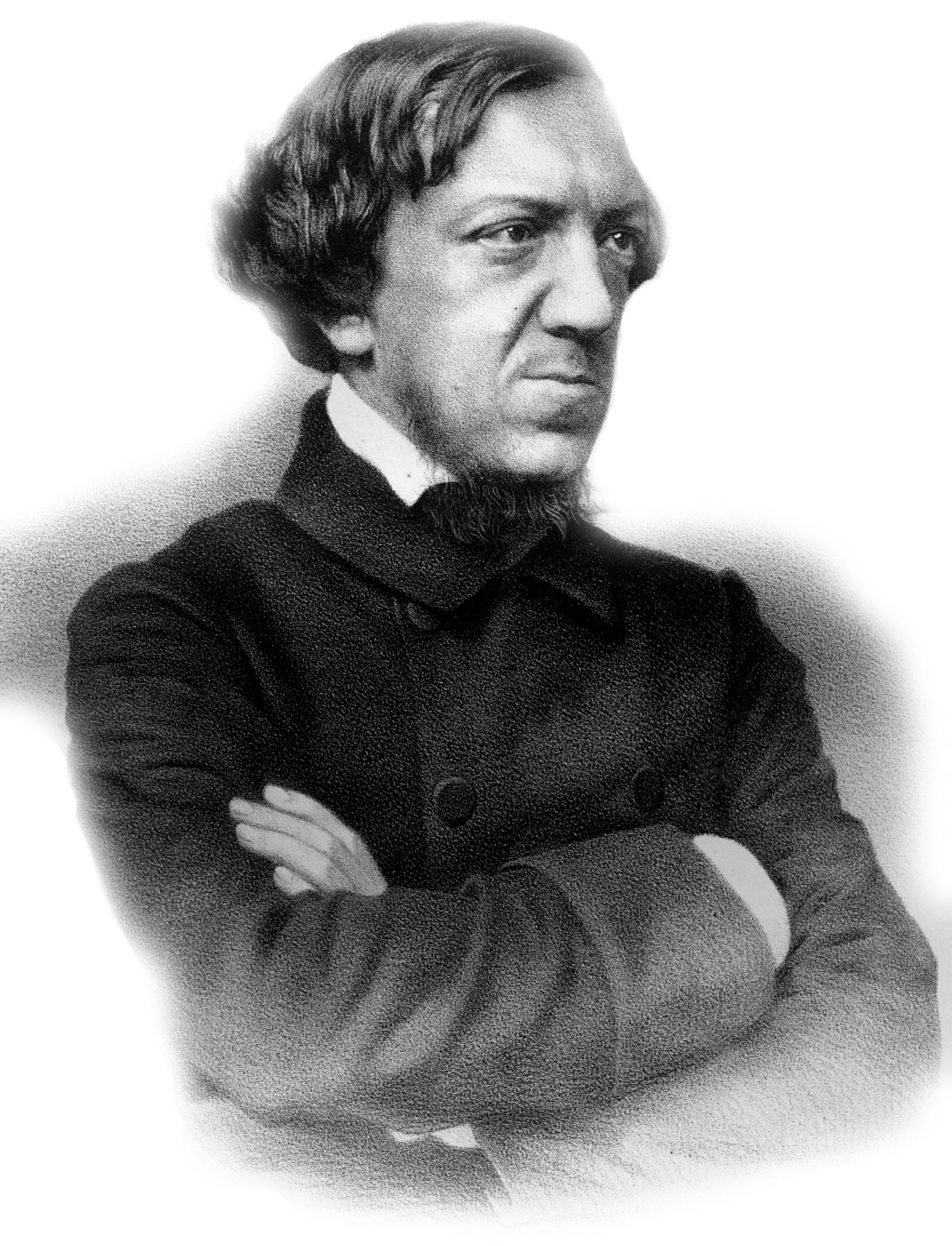
- Born: Vladimir Rafailovich Zotov; Владимир Рафаилович Зотов; July 4, 1821; Saint Petersburg, Russian Empire
- Died: February 18, 1896 (aged 74); Saint Petersburg, Russian Empire
- Occupations: writer, playwright, journalist, editor

Vladimir Rafailovich Zotov (Russian: Владимир Рафаилович Зотов, July 4, 1821, Saint Petersburg, Russian Empire, — February 18, 1896, Saint Petersburg) was a Russian writer, playwright, journalist and editor. The writer and critic Rafail Zotov was his father.

Of the 41 plays he authored the best known were Novgorodsy (Новгородцы, People of Novgorod, 1844), Zhizn Molyera (Жизнь Мольера, The Life of Moliere, 1843) and Syn stepei (Сын степей, The Son of the Steppes, 1844). Zotov wrote several novels, including Voltigeur (Вольтижёрка, 1849) and Stary dom (Старый дом, Old House, 1851). With Vladimir Sollogub he co-wrote a libretto for Anton Rubinstein's Dmitry Donskoy.

Zotov edited the newspapers Teatralnaya Letopis (1843) and Literaturnaya Gazeta (1847) as well as Illyustratsiya (1858—1862) and Illyustrirovanny Listok (1862), the two publications he was instrumental in merging into Illyustrirovannaya Gazeta in 1863. Zotov was an encyclopedist who compiled and edited a History of World Literature (1876—1882). His Memoirs came out in 1890, published by Istorichesky Vestnik, Nos. 1-6.
