= Semya i Shkola =

Russian magazine published in 1871-1888

- Editor: Elena Apreleva, Yulian Simashko
- Frequency: weekly
- Founded: 1871
- Final issue: 1888
- Based in: Saint Petersburg, Russian Empire
- Language: Russian

Semya i Shkola (Russian: Семья и школа, Family and School) was a Russian magazine published in Saint Petersburg in 1871–1888. Founded by writer Elena Apreleva and natural scientist Yulian Simashko, and appealing to both to parents and children, it is considered to be the first serious pedagogical publication in Russia.

The Soviet magazine of the same title founded in 1946 originally distanced itself from its pre-1917 predecessor, but in the latter years was keen to emphasize the lineage.
