= Rostislav Sementkovsky =

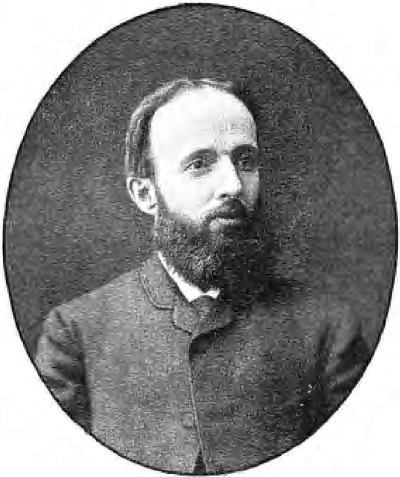
- Born: Rostislav Ivanovich Sementkovsky; Ростислав Иванович Сементковский; 1846; Moscow, Russian Empire
- Died: 1918 (aged 71–72); Petrograd, Soviet Russia
- Occupations: writer, translator,

Rostislav Ivanovich Sementkovsky (Russian: Ростислав Иванович Сементковский, 1846 – 1918) was a Russian writer, publicist and translator, also known under the pen name Ratov.

A professional lawyer, and a Saint Petersburg University's law faculty graduate, Sementkovsky started his career in journalism in 1873, first in Novoye Vremya, then Finansovoye Obozreniye (Finance Review), Birzhevyie Vedomosti, Telegraf and Novosti, where in 1880-1890 he was the head of the Foreign Affairs section. In 1897 he became the editor-in-chief of the popular and influential Niva magazine (where for some years he had edited the Literary News section), while still writing on the broad range of subjects concerning politics, jurisprudence, philosophy and history of literature.

A devoted Francophile and a proponent of the closest possible Franco-Russian relations, Sementkovsky (as Ratov) published in 1897 a book called Pending the War (В ожидании войны) which was immediately translated into French and caused extremely hostile reaction in Germany. Of the several short novels he authored the two best-known were Girl's Dreams (Девичьи сны, 1888) and Jews and Yids (Евреи и жиды, 1890). The Collected Works by R.S. Sementkovsky in 3 volumes came out in 1906.

Among the translations he did into Russian were the books by Robert von Mohl, William Booth, Hippolyte Carnot, Max Nordau, Pierre Paul Leroy-Beaulieu, Paul Lacombe, Kazimierz Krzywicki, John Stuart Mill and Adam Mickiewicz. For the Florenty Pavlenkov's Biographic Library he wrote the biographies of Otto von Bismarck, Denis Diderot, Georg von Cancrin, Antiochus Kantemir and Mikhail Katkov.
