= Vasily Bilbasov =

Historian, journalist

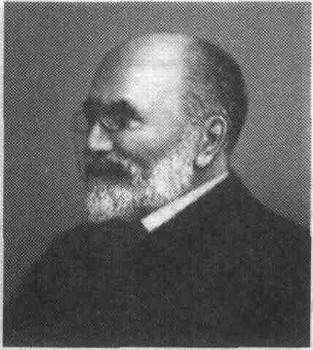
- Born: Vasily Alexeyevich Bilbasov; Василий Алексеевич Бильбасов; 19 June 1838; Poltava, Ukraine, then Russian Empire
- Died: 24 July 1904 (aged 66); Saint Petersburg, Russian Empire
- Education: Imperial Moscow University (1861)
- Occupations: historian, writer, editor

Vasily Alexeyevich Bilbasov (Russian: Василий Алексеевич Бильбасов; 19 June 1838, in Poltava, Ukraine, then Russian Empire – 24 July 1904, in Pavlovsk, Saint Petersburg, Russian Empire) was a Russian Empire historian, editor and publicist, the greatest authority on the rule of Catherine the Great of his time. His magnum opus, the fundamental History of Catherine the Second, published in 1890, and revealing aspects of the great Russian ruler's life that had been hitherto unknown, caused furore; the second volume of it in 1891 was banned. By 1896, two more volumes of the treatise came out, but it remained unfinished.

In 1871-1883 Bilbasov was the editor-in-chief of Golos, the influential liberal newspaper in Saint Petersburg.
