= Boris Glinsky =

Russian editor, publisher and politician (1860–1917)

Boris Borisovich Glinsky
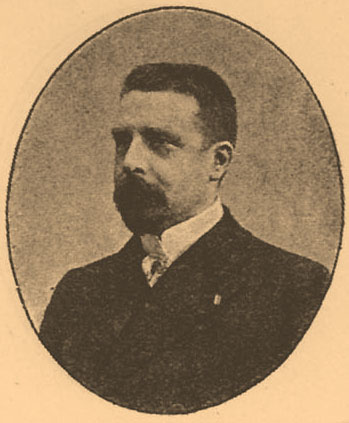
- Born: Борис Борисович Глинский; 12 October 1860; Saint Petersburg, Russian Empire
- Died: 30 November 1917 (aged 57); Petrograd, Soviet Russia
- Occupations: Editor; publisher; writer; politician
- Years active: 1880s–1917

Boris Borisovich Glinsky (Russian: Бори′с Бори′сович Гли′нский; 12 October 1860 in Saint Petersburg, Russian Empire – 30 November 1917 in Petrograd, Soviet Russia) was a writer, publicist, publisher, editor and politician from the Russian Empire. A prominent historian and biographer, Glinsky published numerous articles and essays, mainly in Istorichesky Vestnik, which he was also the editor of in 1913–1917, Severny Vestnik (editor and publisher in 1890—1891), and Russkaya Budushchnost (Russian Future, 1915—1917). Described as a 'progressive nationalist', Glinsky supported both the 1917 February Revolution and the Kornilov affair. As a result, in August 1917 he was arrested on the counter-revolutionary charges, but in October 1917 was released. Glinsky died in Petrograd on 30 November 1917.

== Select bibliography ==
- A Republican at the Russian Court (Республиканец при русском дворе, 1888)
- Vladimir Yakovlevich Stoyunin (Владимир Яковлевич Стоюнин, 1889)
- Orest Fyodorovich Miller (Орест Федорович Миллер, 1889)
- The Magnanimous Conquest (Великодушное покорение, 1890)
- The Judicial Eloquence in Russia (Русское судебное красноречие, 1897)
- The Tsar's Children and Their Tutors (Царские дети и их наставники, 1899)
- The Sketches on the Russian Progress (Очерки русского прогресса, 1900)
- Fighting For the Constitution (Борьба за конституцию. 1908)
- The Revolutionary Period in the Russian History (Революционный период русской истории, parts 1 and 2, 1913)
