= Istorichesky Vestnik =

Russian history magazine

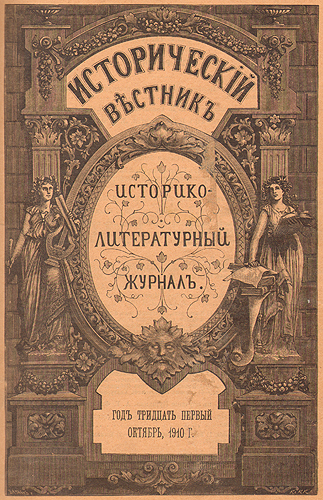
- October 1910 issue cover
- Editor: Sergey Shubinsky; Boris Glinsky
- Frequency: Monthly
- Circulation: 13,000 (in 1913)
- Founded: 1880
- Final issue: 1917 (re-launched in 2012)
- Based in: Saint Petersburg, Russian Empire; Moscow, Russian Federation (since 2012)
- Language: Russian
- ISSN: 2411-1511

Istorichesky Vestnik (Russian: Историческій Вѣстникъ, Исторический вестник, History Herald) was a Russian monthly historical and literary magazine published in Saint Petersburg from 1880 to 1917, and relaunched in 2012.

== History ==
The magazine was founded by the journalist and scholar Sergey Shubinsky and Alexey Suvorin (as publisher) with a view to "providing the reader, in the most lively and accessible form possible, with the full account of what happens in the historical science and literature both in Russia and in Europe." Part of the Russian history journals' 'triumvirate', alongside Russky Arkhiv and Russkaya Starina, it differed from the other two in making accessibility and fine literary style its main priorities.

Among the prominent contributors to Istorichesky Vestnik were Russia's leading historians of the time Mykola Kostomarov, Konstantin Bestuzhev-Ryumin, Egor Zamyslovsky, Alexander Brückner, Ivan Zabelin, Alexey Korsakov, Leonid Maykov and Rafail Zotov.

The historical belletrists Evgeny Salias De Tournemire, Daniil Mordovtsev, Grigory Danilevsky, Vsevolod Solovyov, Evgeny Karnovich, Pyotr Polevoy, Viktor Burenin, Nadezhda Merder (N. Severin), Rostislav Sementkovsky, as well as authors like Sergey Terpigorev, Pyotr Gnedich and Ieronim Yasinsky were regular contributors to Istorichesky vestnik. Several stories and sketches by Nikolai Leskov which later came to be considered part of the Russian classics, also first appeared in this magazine.

Istorichesky Vestnik had unusually large obituary section, each entry amounting to a comprehensive survey of the deceased author's legacy. Using its position, the magazine managed even to publish Anatoly Faresov's obituary to Nikolai Chernyshevsky, the first time such tribute could be made to an author whose work had been officially banned and whose name was forbidden to be mentioned in the press at the time.

It had also extensive sections on the history of literature, archeology, geology and ethnography. Several important memoirs and diaries, by authors like Viktor Askochensky, Ksenofont Polevoy, Avdotya Panayeva, Vladimir Sollogub, Nikolai Ignatyev and Ilya Arsenyev, were published in Istorichesky Vestnik.

Boris Glinsky succeeded Shubinsky as editor-in-chief in 1913, the year when the magazine's popularity reached its peak, with the circulation of 13 thousand. In all, 147 volumes came out, each comprising three monthly issues.

=== Since 2012 ===
In 2012 the magazine was re-launched in Moscow, under the editorship of Anton Gorsky. Its first volume came out as "Issue No. 148"; by 2014, nine more, Nos. 149-157, had followed.
