= Rafail Zotov =

Russian playwright (1795–1871)

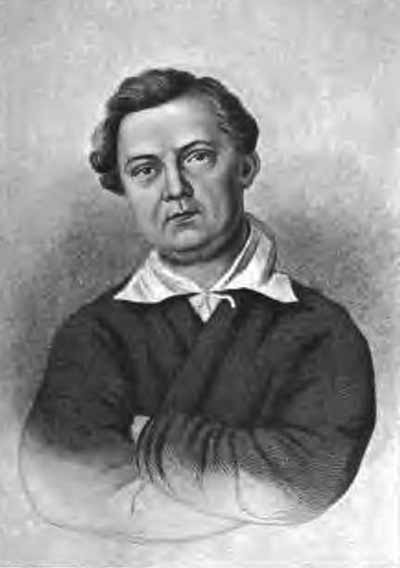
- Born: Rafail Mikhaylovich Zotov; Рафаил Михайлович Зотов; 1795; Pskov, Russian Empire
- Died: 29 September 1871 (aged 75–76); Pavlovsk, Saint Petersburg, Russian Empire
- Occupations: playwright, novelist, journalist, translator, theatre critic

Rafail Mikhaylovich Zotov (Russian: Рафаил Михайлович Зотов, 1795, — September 29, 1871) was a Russian playwright, novelist, journalist, translator and theatre critic. The playwright Vladimir Zotov was his son.

Born in Pskov, Zotov started his literary career in 1814. He has written more than one hundred plays some of which (Jealous Wife, 1816; Bohemian Forests' Outlaw, 1830) enjoyed long runs at the Imperial Theatres and popular success, even if evoking scathing criticism from Vissarion Belinsky. Zotov translated ten Russian plays into German and compiled the official biography of Tsar Alexander I, in French. Highly popular were his historical novels (Leonid or the Selected Scenes from the Life of Napoleon I, Леонид или Некоторые черты из жизни Наполеона I, 1832; Mysterious Monk, Таинственный монах, 1843, among them). The final one, posthumously published The Last Descendant of Genghis Khan (Последний потомок Чингисхана, 1881) dealt with the life and possible circumstances of death of his father, Mikhail Zotov, a direct descendant from Şahin Giray who, then a colonel in Prince Prozorovsky's Moldavian Army, mysteriously disappeared in 1809. Rafail Zotov also authored the acclaimed Theatre Memoirs (Театральные воспоминания, 1859). The Notes by R. M. Zotov were published by Illyustrirovanny Vestnik, 1874, Nos. 3–8.

Zotov died on 29 September in Pavlovsk, Saint Petersburg.
