= Mikhail Mikhailov (writer) =

Russian author

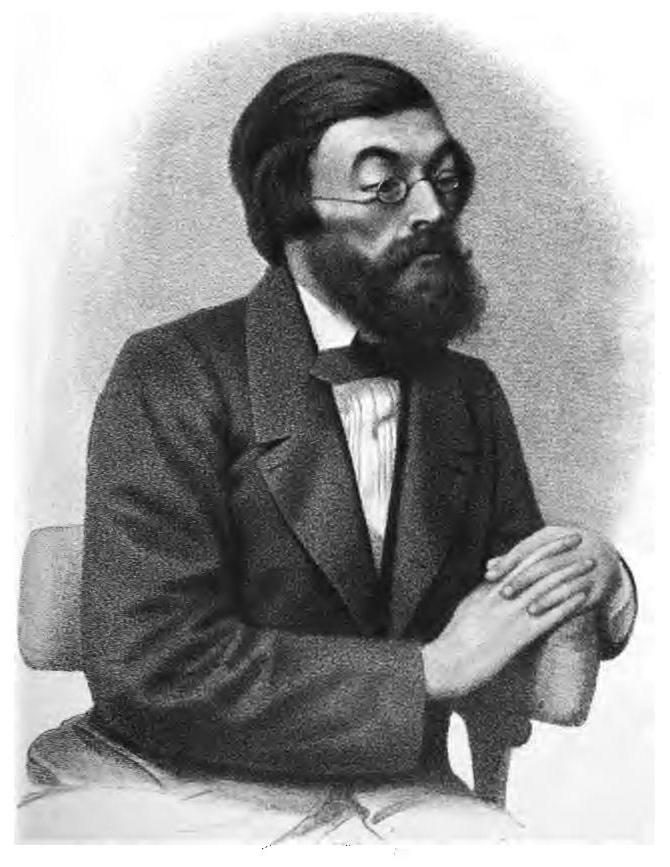
- Born: Mikhail Larionovitch Mikhailov; 16 January 1829 Ufa, Russian Empire
- Died: 15 August 1865 (aged 36) Kadai village, Russian Empire

Mikhail Larionovitch Mikhailov (Russian: Михаил Ларионович Михайлов) (16 January 1829 – 15 August 1867) was a Russian author.

== Biography ==
He was educated at Saint Petersburg and engaged in literary pursuits as a translator, journalist and writer of fiction. His political sympathies caused his exile to Siberia.

== Writing ==
He was a contributor to Sovremennik (“The Contemporary”) and an advocate of the reforms of the self-emancipation era. His collected translations and writings were published (3 vols., 1858–59).
