= Konstantin Staniukovich =

Russian writer

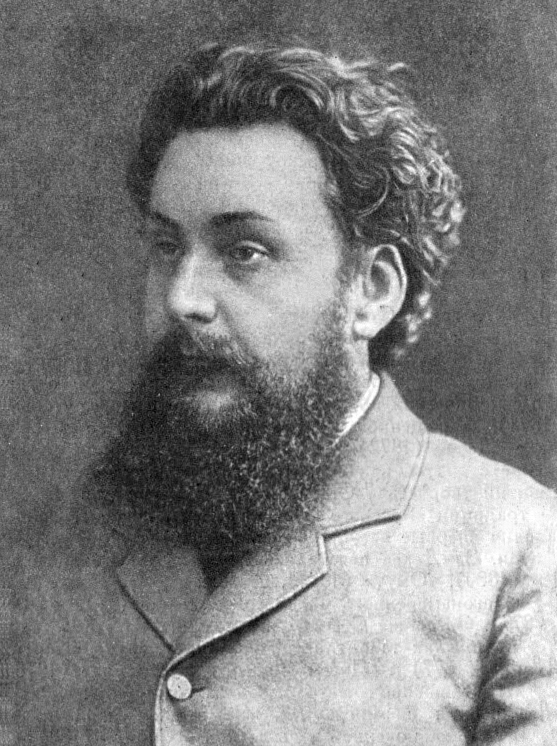
- Born: March 30, 1843; Sevastopol, Russia Empire (now Russia or Ukraine) (Note: Sevastopol and the rest of Crimea are currently a matter of international dispute between Russia and Ukraine. See Annexation of Crimea by the Russian Federation for clarification)
- Died: May 20, 1903 (aged 60); Naples, Italy
- Occupation: Writer
- Writing career
- Period: 1860s-1900
- Genre: Fiction
- Notable awards: Pushkin Prize
- Movement: Realism

Konstantin Mikhaylovich Staniukovich or Stanyukovich (Russian: Константин Михайлович Станюкович; March 30, 1843 – May 20, 1903) was a Russian writer, remembered today mostly for his stories of the Russian Imperial Navy.

== Biography ==
=== Early life ===
The son of an admiral Mikhail Nikolaievich Staniukovich, he was enrolled in the Imperial Naval School. When he expressed his desire to pursue a literary rather than a naval career, his father engineered his immediate assignment, before graduation, to a long voyage "to clear his head of nonsense". After the three-year tour ended, by which time he was graduated ship-board and twice promoted to full ensign, he nonetheless resigned from the Navy, was disowned by his family, and embarked on his career as a writer in the liberal camp of 1860s Russia.

=== Career ===
By the early 1880s, he had gained moderate acclaim for his writing on social issues. Arrested in 1885 for illegal contact with exiles in Western Europe and banished for three years to Siberia, he turned to his twenty-year-old memories of the Navy. Drawing on the same cast of characters and recurring situations, viewed from varying perspectives, he produced a body of sea stories over the following two decades.

The stories feature a range of naval characters, including captains, officers, boatswains, and enlisted sailors, depicted across varied moral and professional types. Recurring plot elements include shipwrecks, shipboard duels, foreign ports, and civilian passengers. The narratives are set during peacetime and draw on colloquial sailor speech to characterize the lower ranks.

=== Legacy ===
Staniukovich died in 1903. His political views ensured that he continued to be reprinted throughout the Soviet period, and a ten-volume edition of his collected works in 1977 had a print run of 375,000.

== Notes ==
=== English translations ===
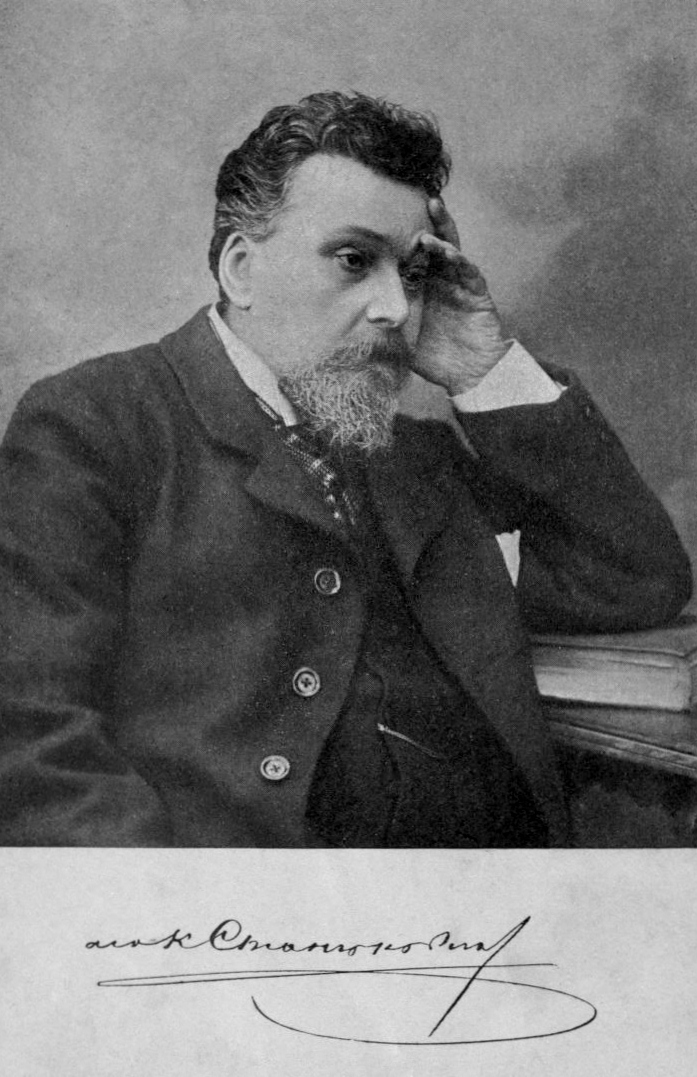
Stanyukovich c.1900

- Bobtail, and The Convict, (Stories), from Little Russian Masterpieces, Volume 4, G.P. Putnam's Sons, 1920.
- Running to the Shrouds: Russian Sea Stories, Forest Books, 1996.
- Maximka: Sea Stories, Foreign Languages Publishing House, Moscow.

=== Major Russian editions ===
- К.М. Станюкович. Собрание сочинений в 13-ти томах. изд. А.А. Карцева, М., 1897–1900, 1902
  K.M. Staniukovich. Collected works in 13 volumes. A.A.Kartsev, Pub., Moscow, 1897–1900, 1902
- К.М. Станюкович. Собрание сочинений в 6 томах. Гослитиздат, М., 1958
  K.M. Staniukovich. Collected works in 6 volumes. State Publishing House for Literature, Moscow, 1958
- К.М. Станюкович. Собрание сочинений в 10 томах. изд. «Правда», М., 1977
  K.M. Staniukovich. Collected works in 10 volumes. Pravda Publishers, Moscow, 1977
