= Niva (magazine) =

Russian magazine (1869–1918)

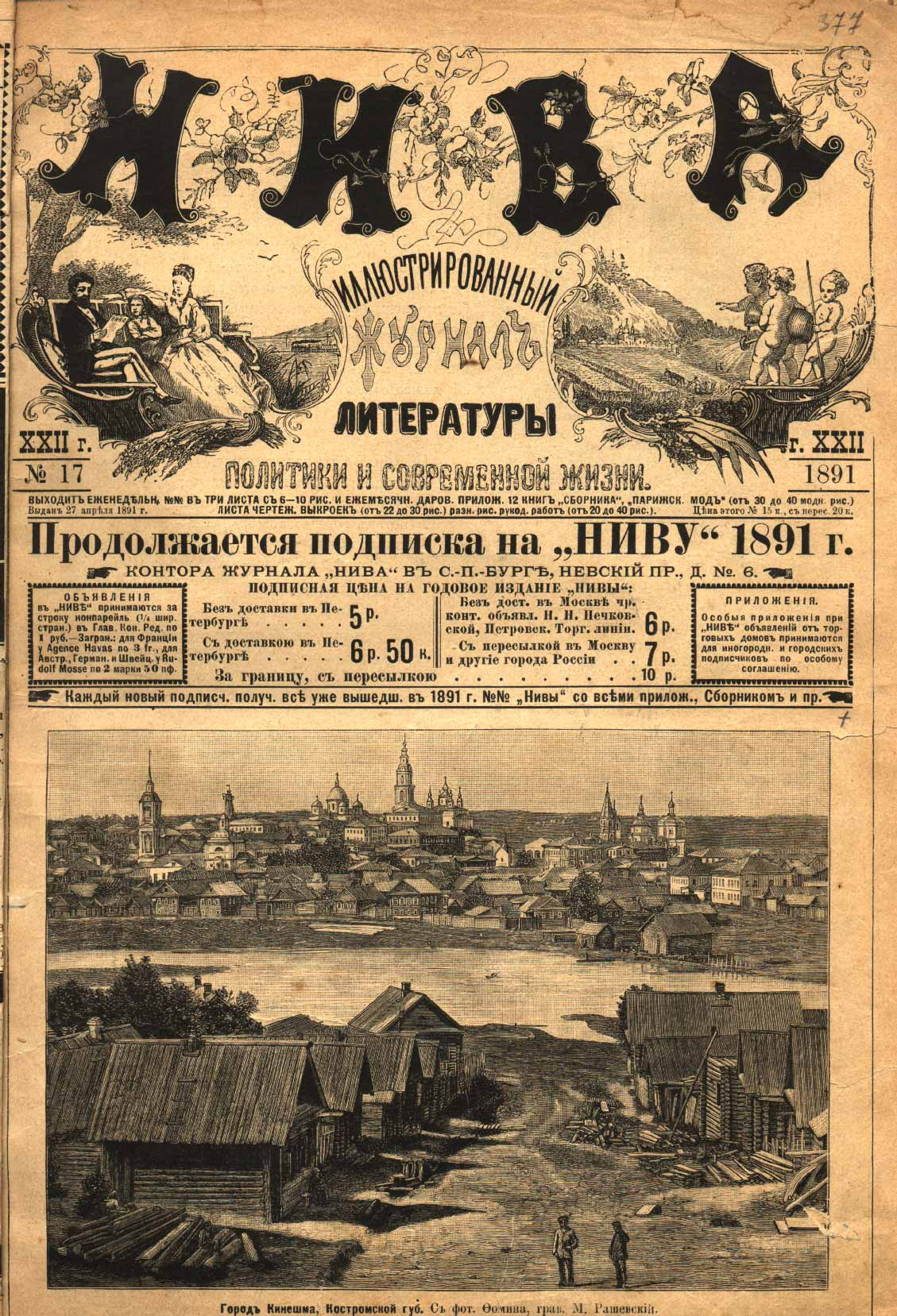
- An issue from April 27, 1891
- Frequency: Monthly
- Circulation: 200,000
- Founded: 1870
- Final issue: 1918
- Based in: St. Petersburg
- Language: Russian

Niva (Russian: Нива) (Grainfield) was the most popular magazine of late-nineteenth-century Russia; it lasted from 1870 to 1918, and defined itself on its masthead as "an illustrated weekly journal of literature, politics and modern life." Niva was the first of the Russian "thin magazines", illustrated weeklies that "contrasted with the more serious and ideologically focused monthly 'thick journals' intended for the educated reader."

== History ==
It was founded by A. F. Marx, a German immigrant who saw that Russia lacked moderately priced magazines of general interest. He intended Niva to be a politically neutral family magazine, but the periodical soon outgrew its original purpose and became an ambitious vehicle for the dissemination of good literature in the provinces. It was read by an audience that extended from primary schoolteachers, rural parish priests, and the urban middle class to the gentry." One of its most popular features was the bonus premiums offered as an inducement to subscribe; at first these consisted of large colored prints of art in traditional style by artists such as Konstantin Makovsky. Later science and literature supplements were added, as well as a children's section; by the end of the century, the most important premium was the collected works of Russian classical authors: "By 1912 Niva subscribers had received much of the best in Russian literature, including the works of Gogol, Lermontov, Goncharov, Dostoevsky, Turgenev, Leskov, Chekhov, and others."

In his autobiography, Maxim Gorky says that his employers in the early 1880s subscribed to Niva "for the cut-out patterns and the prize offers; but they never read it"; he himself, however, was enthralled by the volumes he pulled out from under their bed and read at night: "[T]he pictures and their captions ... placed in my ken a world which widened every day, a world splendid like the cities of romance. They brought me views of lofty peaks and lovely beaches. Life unfolded its marvels; earth became more enchanting, studded with towns and laden with treasures."

Niva was very successful; starting with 9,000 readers in its first year, by the early twentieth century it had a circulation of over 200,000. Its editorial office was at 22 Malaya Morskaya Street.

A page of serialized fiction: Viktor Muyzhel’s “Na voine” (“At War”), illustrated by Ivan Vladimirov, in issue 48 (1916).

It was a large publication, almost the size of a tabloid newspaper; in 1900 a typical issue had 24 pages. Most of the text consisted of serialized fiction by respected writers; there were also short news and sports reports, ethnographic essays, and notes on science and technology, as well as information on all aspects of city life. Its editors included Viktor Klyushnikov (1870 to 1892, with interruptions), Dmitry Stakheev (1875–1877), Fedor Berg (1878–1887), Mikhail Volkonsky (1892–1894), Alexei Tikhonov-Lugovoi (1895–1897), Rostislav Sementkovsky (1897–1904), and Valerian Ivchenko-Svetlov (1910–1916).

Among its contributors over the years were A. K. Tolstoy, Fyodor Tyutchev, Leo Tolstoy (his Resurrection was first serialized in Niva), Nikolai Leskov, Grigory Danilevsky, Afanasy Fet, Anton Chekhov, Maxim Gorky, Vladimir Solovyov, Alexander Blok, Sergei Yesenin, Korney Chukovsky, Ivan Bunin, Osip Mandelstam, Anna Akhmatova, Nikolay Gumilyov, Valery Bryusov, Dmitry Merezhkovsky, Georgy Ivanov, Konstantin Balmont, Mikhail Kuzmin, Fyodor Sologub, Teffi, Alexander Grin, and Ilya Ehrenburg, among many others.

After Marx's death in 1904, Niva was published by the A. F. Marx Publishing and Printing Company, which was bought by the literary entrepreneur Ivan Sytin in 1916. It continued to be popular after the October Revolution, especially in the provinces (in the capitals it was the object of frequent jokes by the sophisticated), but was closed by the Bolsheviks in September 1918.

== Sources ==
- Saint Petersburg Encyclopedia entry
- Jeffrey Brooks, When Russia Learned to Read: Literacy and Popular Literature, 1861–1917, Northwestern University Press, 2003 (ISBN 0-8101-1897-1).
