= Alexander Sheller =

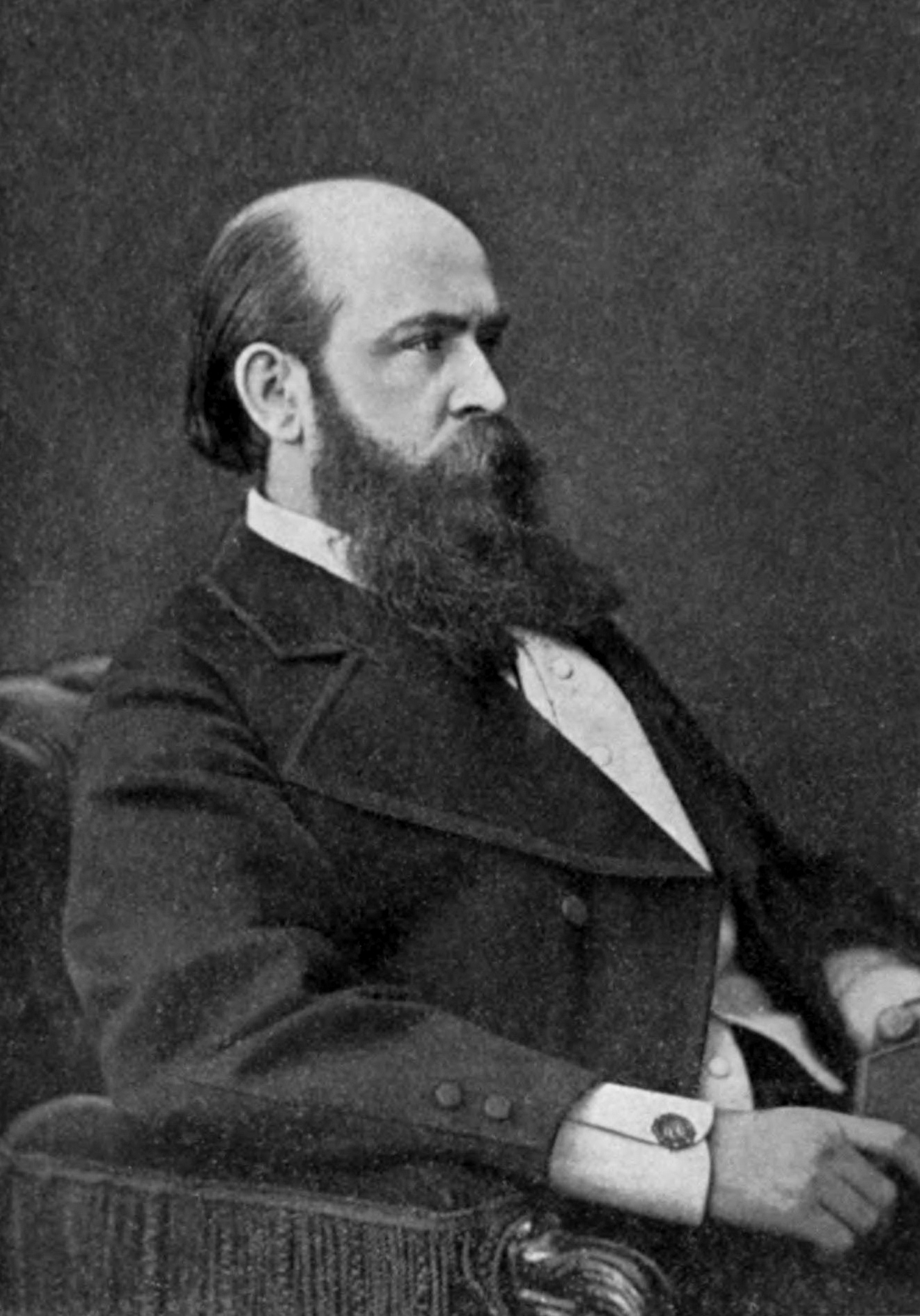
- Born: Alexander Konstantinovch Sheller; Александр Константинович Шеллер; August 11, 1838; Saint Petersburg, Russian Empire
- Died: December 4, 1900 (aged 62); Saint Petersburg, Russian Empire
- Occupation: writer • poet • editor
- Years active: 1850s-1900

Alexander Konstantinovch Sheller (Russian: Алекса′ндр Константи′нович Ше′ллер, 11 August 1838, Saint Petersburg, Russian Empire, – 4 December 1900, Saint Petersburg, Russian Empire) was a Russian writer of Estonian and Polish origins. A regular contributor to Sovremennik, Delo and Russkoye Slovo, Sheller published numerous stories, poems, translations, articles and essays, often using the pseudonym A.Mikhaylov, and is sometimes referred to as A.K. Sheller-Mikhaylov. His best-known novel was Gnilyie bolota (Putrid Moors, 1864), followed by Zhizn Shupova (The Life of Shupov, 1865) and Staryie gnyozda (Old Nests, 1875). The Complete Works of A.K. Sheller-Mikhaylov in 15 volumes came out in 1895.
