= Nikolai Shelgunov =

Russian journalist (1824–1891)

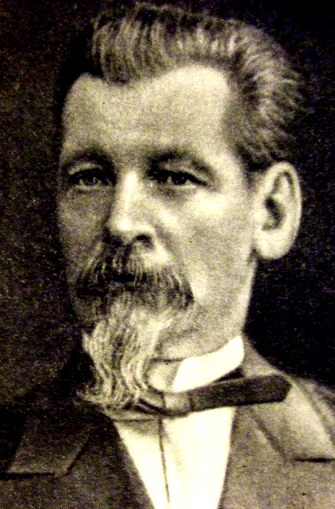
Nikolay Vasilyevich(1824–1891)

Nikolai Vasil'evich Shelgunov (Russian: Никола́й Васи́льевич Шелгуно́в; November 22 [N.S. December 4] 1824 – 12 April [N.S. 24 April] 1891) was a Russian forestry professor, journalist, and literary critic, who became a notable figure of the Russian nihilist movement.

Nikolai was born the son of a nobleman, on November 22 [O.S. December 4] 1824 in Saint Petersburg. He studied at the Imperial Forestry Institute in Saint Petersburg, graduating in 1841 and joining the staff of the forestry department of the Ministry of State Domains. By the late 1850s he was appointed professor at the Forestry Institute.

Shelgunov met M. L. Mikhailov in 1855. The two men travelled to London in 1858 and 1859, meeting Alexander Herzen and Nikolay Ogarev. Shelgunov returned to Russia and got involved with Nikolay Chernyshevsky contributing to the journals Russkoe slovo, Sovremennik, and Vek. He participated in the revolutionary movement of the 1860s co-writing To the Younger Generation with Mikhailov. He also wrote the unpublished proclamation To Russian Soldiers From Their Well-wishers. He also introduced the Russian public to Frederick Engels' work The Condition of the Working Class in England through his article 'The Working Proletariat in England and France' (Sovremennik, 1861, nos. 9–11).

Shelgunov was also the editor of the journal Cause until his arrest in 1881.

== Publications ==
- Sochineniia, 3rd ed, vols. 1–3. St. Petersburg [1904].
- Literaturnaia kritika Leningrad, 1974.
- Vospominaniia in N. V. Shelgunov, L. P. Shelgunova, and M. L. Mikhailov, Vospominaniia, vol. 1. Moscow, 1967.
- Neizdannye stranitsy vospominanii Prometei, vol 2. Moscow, 1967.
