= Delo (magazine) =

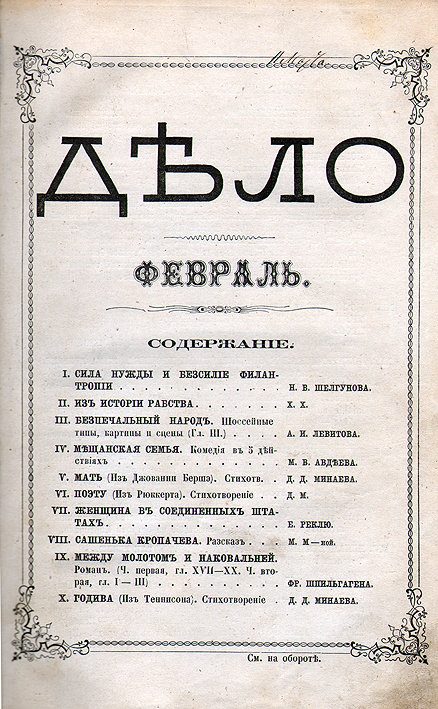
- February 1869 issue's title page
- Editor: Nikolai Shulgin (1866–1879); Pyotr Bykov (1880–1881); Nikolai Shelgunov (1881–1882); Konstantin Stanyukovich (1883); Viktor Ostrogorsky (1883–1884); Dmitry Tsertelev (1885–1886); I. S. Durnovo (1886–1888)
- Frequency: Monthly
- First issue: Summer 1866
- Final issue: January 1888
- Based in: Saint Petersburg, Russian Empire
- Language: Russian

Delo (Дело, Labour) was a monthly magazine published in Saint Petersburg, Russia, from mid-1866 till January 1888. Led formally by Nikolai Shulgin (1866–1879) and informally by Grigory Blagosvetlov, Delo was seen as an ideological heir to Russkoye Slovo (edited by the latter and closed by the authorities after Dmitry Karakozov's assassination attempt) and until 1884 remained one of the two (alongside Otechestvennye Zapiski) most radical Russian publications of the time.

After the arrest of the magazine's editor Nikolai Shelgunov (in 1883) and his successor Konstantin Stanyukovich a year later, the publication of Delo stopped. It re-emerged in 1885 as a conservative organ, with I.S. Durnovo as publisher and Dmitry Tsertelev as editor, but failed to cope with the lack of public interest and folded for good in 1888.
