= Pyotr Polevoy =

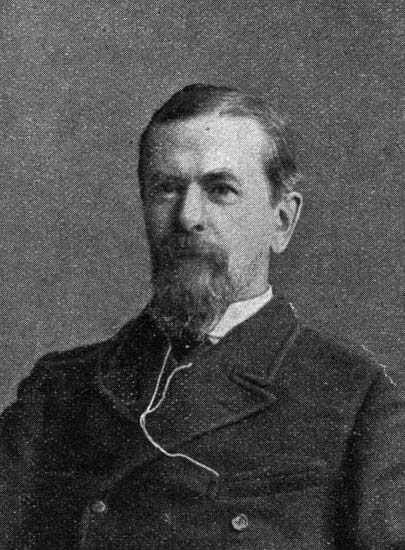
- Born: Пётр Николаевич Полевой; 9 March 1839; Saint Petersburg, Russian Empire
- Died: 12 February 1902 (aged 62); Saint Petersburg, Russian Empire
- Occupation: writer • playwright • translator • critic • editor • historian
- Years active: 1871-1902
- Website: Moshkov library entry

Pyotr Nikolayevich Polevoy (Russian: Пётр Николаевич Полевой, 9 March 1839, Saint Petersburg, Russian Empire, — 12 February 1902, Saint Petersburg, Russian Empire) was a Russian writer, playwright, translator, critic, editor and literary historian. The prominent journalist and editor Nikolai Polevoy was his father.

A Saint Petersburg University graduate, for a decade Polevoy taught Russian literature and philology first at his alma mater, then at Novorossiysk and Warsaw Universities. In 1871 he turned professional writer and in the course of the next thirty years published numerous historical novels and novellas as well as plays and critical and historical essays.

The 1911 Works by P.N. Polevoy in 6 volumes collected only a fraction of his vast and somewhat patchy legacy which he himself occasionally spoke dismissively of (admitting in his latter years to have been a "writing automaton... ready to churn out drama, novella, history, criticism, whatever"). Still, Pyotr Polevoy has been credited as a tireless popularizer of both literature and history. Among his notable works are the History of Russian Literature in Essays and Biographies (История русской литературы в очерках и биографиях, 1871) and the History of Russian Literature From the Ancient Times to Our Days (1900, in 3 volumes).
