= Vestnik Evropy =

Russian magazine published 1866 to 1918

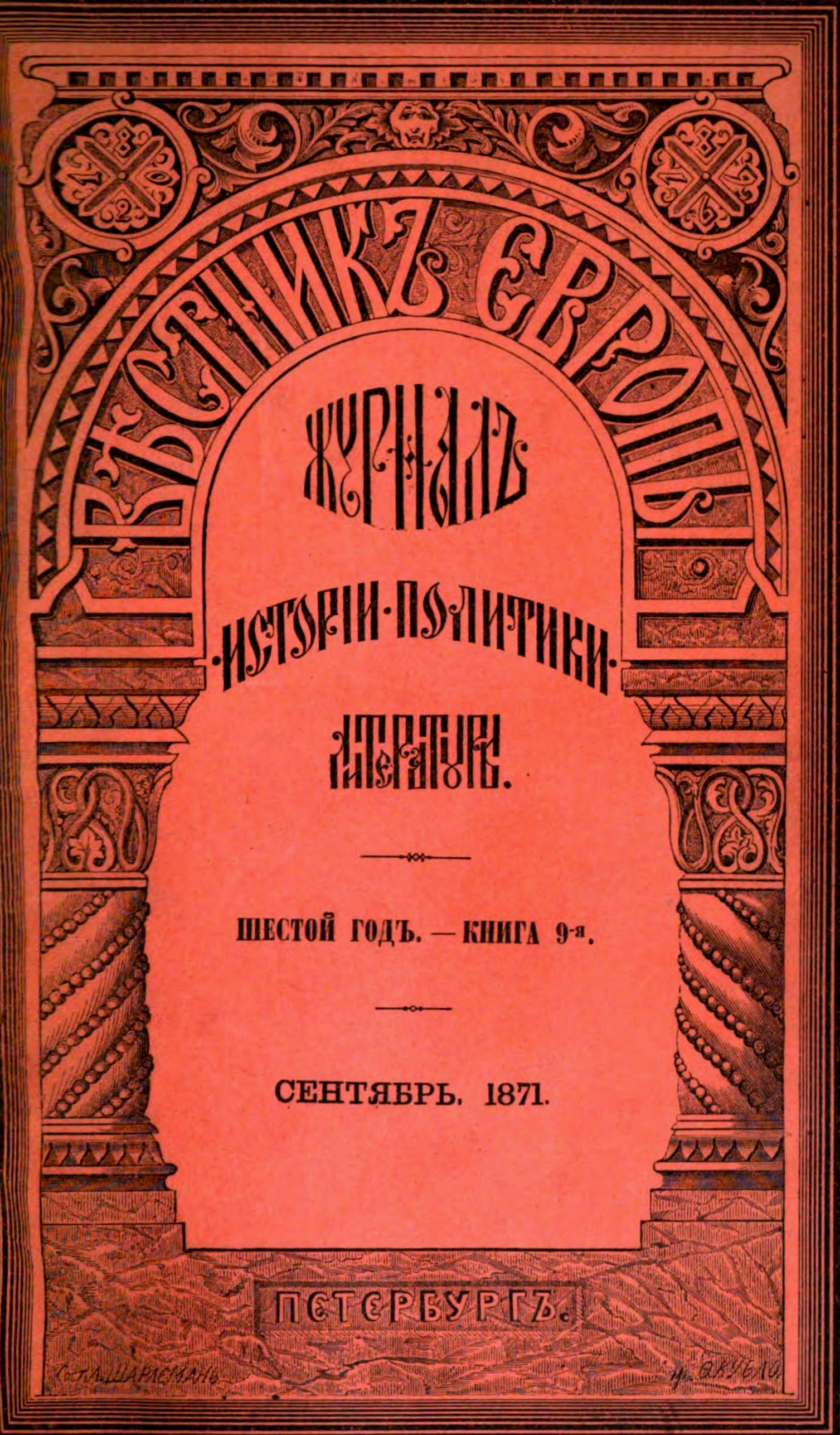
- An 1871 cover
- Frequency: Monthly
- Founded: 1866
- Final issue: 1918
- Based in: St. Petersburg
- Language: Russian

Vestnik Evropy (Russian: Вестник Европы) (Herald of Europe or Messenger of Europe) was the major liberal magazine of late-nineteenth-century Russia. It was published from 1866 to 1918.

The magazine (named for an earlier publication edited by Nikolay Karamzin) was founded by Mikhail Matveevich Stasyulevich, a former professor of history, who remained the publisher-editor until 1909; its editorial office "was located in Stasyulevich's flat at 20 Galernaya Street and was one of the centres of St. Petersburg's cultural and political life (the journal's major contributors as well as their friends and associates used to get together on Wednesdays)." The first issue appeared in March 1866; for the first two years it was a historical quarterly, but from 1868 it covered history, politics, and literature and came out each month. "The journal always had a serious, objective, professorial character; even in the most heated polemics, for example, it shunned harsh invective and often even avoided naming its adversary." It consistently supported the zemstvos, judicial reforms, and other reforms of the 1860s, publishing frequent articles on foreign countries and on Russian history that served to promote its own views on contemporary society and politics. It "placed its dark red monthly booklet, 'like a little brick, on the slowly and arduously erected structure of social rights and consciousness.'"

In the political climate of 1860s Russia, especially following the January Uprising of 1863, the editors of Vestnik Evropy found it necessary both politically (to avoid censorship or imprisonment) and economically (to attract and keep readers) to distance themselves from the Polish independence movement. Nikolai Kostomarov, a Ukrainian, was the only member of staff who had a reputation for Anti-Polish sentiment. Stasyulevich and the rest of the Herald's editorial crew, however, had ties to Poland as well as political sympathy. While none of them supported full independence, the paper's overall pro-Polish leaning was seen as dangerous and subversive. Kostomarov's critical and even Polonophobic articles served to protect the journal from accusations of being overly pro-Poland.

During the heated ideological struggles of the 1870s and 1880s, the magazine tried to steer a course between moderate reformism and the kind of revolutionary socialism it consistently opposed; Leonid-Lyudvig Slonimsky, a frequent contributor on economic and political topics, wrote a regular "Foreign Survey" which he used "to sketch the outlines of an ideal relationship between liberals and socialists in Russia’s not-too-distant parliamentary future, which involved one group supplementing its program with demands for social reforms and the other abandoning its calls for revolution." In the 1880s, it repudiated state socialism "as a matter of principle, while continuing to build on the arguments in favor of state interference, which it saw as guaranteeing the people’s welfare"; it also "rejected both the absolutization of the right to private ownership of land and the idea that the land should be nationalized."

Following the 1905 Russian Revolution, many of its members joined the Constitutional Democratic Party, which separated the journal more and more from the radical movement, and in the spring of 1918 its publication was suppressed by the Soviet authorities subject to the Decree on the Press, the final issue appearing in the March of 1918.

Among its contributors over the years were the scientists Kliment Timiryazev, Ivan Sechenov, and Ilya Mechnikov; the historians Sergey Solovyov, Konstantin Kavelin, and Tadeusz Stefan Zieliński; the literary scholars Alexander Veselovsky and Alexander Pypin; and the writers Ivan Turgenev, Ivan Goncharov, Aleksandr Ostrovsky, Grigory Danilevsky, and Vladimir Solovyov, among many others.

== Sources ==
- Fedyashin, Anton A. Liberals under Autocracy: Modernization and Civil Society in Russia, 1866-1904 (2012), full scale scholarly history. excerpt
- Saint Petersburg Encyclopedia entry
- Effie Ambler, Russian Journalism and Politics: The Career of Aleksei S. Suvorin, 1861-1881, Detroit: Wayne State University Press, 1972 (ISBN 0814314619).
- Kitaev, V. A. (2007). "The Unique Liberalism of Vestnik Evropy (1870-1890)". Russian Studies in History. 46: 43–61.
