= 2016 in public domain =

When a work's copyright expires, it enters the public domain. The following is a list of works that entered the public domain in 2016. Since laws vary globally, the copyright status of some works are not uniform.

== Authors entering the public domain ==
=== Authors entering the public domain 70 years after death ===
With the exception of Belarus and Spain, a work enters the public domain in Europe and Brazil 70 years after the creator's death, if it was published during the creator's lifetime. The list is sorted alphabetically and includes a notable work of the creator that entered the public domain on January 1, 2016.

Names	Country	Birth	Death	Occupation	Notable work
Achmed Abdullah	United States	12 May 1881	12 May 1945	Pulp writer and screenwriter	
Nikola Avramov	Bulgaria	21 May 1897	15 June 1945	Still life paintings	
Milena Pavlović-Barili	Serbia	5 November 1909	6 March 1945	Painter, poet	
Maurice Baring	United Kingdom	27 April 1874	14 December 1945	Writer	
Béla Bartók	Hungary	25 March 1881	26 September 1945	Composer	Concerto for Orchestra
Robert Benchley	United States	15 September 1889	21 November 1945	Humorist	newspaper and magazine columns
Henry Bellamann	United States	28 April 1882	16 June 1945	Writer	Kings Row
Ursula Bethell	New Zealand	6 October 1874	15 January 1945	Poet	Collected poetry
Vilhelms Bokslafs	Latvia; Russian Empire	12 October 1858	9 March 1945	Architect	Most notable buildings are Jaunmokas Manor near Tukums and Commercial school in Riga (now Art Academy of Latvia)
Nicola Bombacci	Italy	24 October 1879	28 April 1945	Marxist-Fascist journalist	Il mio pensiero sul bolscevismo (1941), I contadini nella Russia di Stalin (1942), I contadini nell'Italia di Mussolini (1943)
Dietrich Bonhoeffer	Germany	4 February 1906	9 April 1945	Theologian	
Robert Brasillach	France	31 March 1909	6 February 1945	Writer	Je suis partout
Miles J. Breuer	United States	3 January 1889	14 October 1945	Writer	"The Gostak and the Doshes" (1930) and other science fiction stories
Fritz Brupbacher	Switzerland	30 June 1874	1 January 1945	Writer	Der Sinn des Lebens
Thomas Burke	United Kingdom	29 November 1886	22 November 1945	Writer	Limehouse Nights
Alexander Stirling Calder	United States	11 January 1870	7 January 1945	Sculptor	George Washington as President
David Young Cameron	United Kingdom	28 June 1865	16 September 1945	Artist	
Franklin Carmichael	Canada	5 May 1890	24 October 1945	Artist	
Anica Černej	Slovenia	3 April 1900	3 May 1945	Author, poet	
Benjamin De Casseres	United States	3 April 1873	7 December 1945	Journalist, poet	The Shadow-Eater
Margaret Deland	United States	23 February 1856	13 January 1945	Writer	John Ward, Preacher
Mário de Andrade	Brazil	9 October 1893	25 February 1945	Writer	Macunaíma
Robert Desnos	France	4 July 1900	8 June 1945	Poet	
Maurice Donnay	France	12 October 1859	31 March 1945	Dramatist	
Lord Alfred Douglas	United Kingdom	12 June 1859	20 March 1945	Writer	Two Loves
Theodore Dreiser	United States	27 August 1871	28 December 1945	Writer, journalist	Sister Carrie, An American Tragedy
E. R. Eddison	United Kingdom	24 November 1882	18 August 1945	Writer	The Worm Ouroboros
Gus Edwards	United States	18 August 1879	7 November 1945	Songwriter	"By the Light of the Silvery Moon", "In My Merry Oldsmobile"
Eleanor Fortescue-Brigdale	United Kingdom	1871	10 March 1945	Artist	The Uninvited Guest, Riches
Anne Frank	Germany	12 June 1929	February 1945	Diarist	The Diary of a Young Girl
Øvre Richter Frich	Norway	24 March 1872	13 May 1945	Writer, journalist	
Zinaida Gippius	Russia	20 November 1869	9 September 1945	Writer, poet	
Adolf Hitler	Germany	20 April 1889	30 April 1945	Politician, Dictator of Nazi Germany	Mein Kampf, Zweites Buch
Suphi Nuri İleri	Turkey	1887	1945	Writer	
Ljubomir Ivanović	Serbia	24 February 1882	23 November 1945	Printmaker, draughtsman	
Malcolm Jameson	United States	21 December 1891	16 April 1945	Writer	Writer for American pulp magazines during the Golden Age of Science Fiction
Joseph Jastrow	United States	30 January 1863	8 January 1945	Psychologist	
Juliusz Kaden-Bandrowski	Poland	24 February 1885	8 August 1945	Writer, journalist	
Osman Cemal Kaygılı	Turkey	4 October 1879	9 January 1945	Writer	
Carl Wilhelm Kern	United States	4 June 1874	19 August 1945	Composer	
Käthe Kollwitz	Germany	8 July 1867	22 April 1945	Artist	The Prisoners
Julius Korngold	Austria	24 December 1860	25 September 1945	Music critic	
Jaroslav Kratochvil	Czech Republic	17 January 1885	20 March 1945	Writer	
René Lalique	France	6 April 1860	1 May 1945	Glass designer	
Else Lasker-Schüler	Germany	11 February 1869	22 January 1945	Writer	poetry and plays
James Leatham	United Kingdom	19 December 1865	14 December 1945	Writer, printer, publisher	
Jonas Lie	Norway	31 December 1899	11 May 1945	Writer, minister	
David Lindsay	United Kingdom	3 March 1876	16 July 1945	Writer	A Voyage to Arcturus
Eoin MacNeill	Ireland	15 May 1867	15 October 1945	Writer	Phases of Irish History
Tobias Matthay	United Kingdom	19 February 1858	15 December 1945	Teacher, pianist, composer	writings on piano playing
Arthur Mendel	Romania	1872	1945	Painter	
Régis Messac	France	2 August 1893	1945	Writer, poet, translator	
James V. Monaco	United States	13 January 1885	16 October 1945	Songwriter	"You Made Me Love You (I Didn't Want to Do It)"
Arthur Morrison	United Kingdom	1 November 1863	4 December 1945	Writer	A Child of the Jago
Benito Mussolini	Italy	29 July 1883	28 April 1945	Politician	My Autobiography
Moritz Nähr	Austria	4 August 1859	29 June 1945	Photographer	
Alla Nazimova	United States	3 June 1879	13 July 1945	Writer, actor	
Dobri Nemirov	Bulgaria	3 February 1882	30 September 1945	Writer	When I was young
Otto Neurath	Austria	10 December 1882	22 December 1945	Writer	Anti-Spengler
Anne Marie Carl-Nielsen	Denmark	21 June 1863	21 February 1945	Sculptor	Equestrian Statue of King Christian IX, Copenhagen
Charles Gilman Norris	United States	23 April 1881	25 July 1945	Writer, playwright	Salt (1919)
George S. Patton	United States	11 November 1885	21 December 1945	General	War As I Knew it
Harry Pease	United States	6 September 1886	8 November 1944	Songwriter	
Calel Perechodnik	Poland	8 September 1916	September 1945	Diarist	
Ion Pillat	Romania	31 March 1891	17 April 1945	Poet	Pe Argeș în sus, Poeme într-un vers
Karel Poláček	Czech Republic	22 March 1892	21 January 1945	Writer	
Vilhelms Purvītis	Latvia; Russian Empire	3 March 1872	14 January 1945	Landscape painter and educator	
Ernö Rapée	United States	4 June 1891	26 June 1945	Composer	silent film music
Edward Prosser Rhys	United Kingdom	4 March 1901	6 February 1945	Writer	Cerddi Prosser Rhys
Albert Richards	United Kingdom	19 December 1919	5 March 1945	Artist	Artwork produced during the Second World War about the British war effort
Alexander Roda Roda	Austria	13 April 1872	20 August 1945	Writer	
Hando Ruus	Estonia	16 May 1917	31 March 1945	Military captain, artist	
Felix Salten	Austria	6 September 1869	8 October 1945	Writer	Bambi. Eine Lebensgeschichte aus dem Walde
Alexander Siloti	Ukraine	9 October 1863	8 December 1945	Pianist, composer	
Kārlis Skalbe	Latvia; Russian Empire	7 November 1879	14 April 1945	Writer, poet, and activist	
Paul Smărăndescu	Romania	26 June 1881	12 January 1945	Architect	
Antal Szerb	Hungary	1 May 1901	27 January 1945	Writer	The Pendragon Legend
Ong Schan Tchow	China	19 September 1900	20 December 1945	Artist	Book of Chrysanthemums
Nikolai Tcherepnin	Russia	15 May 1873	26 June 1945	Composer	
Aleksey Nikolayevich Tolstoy	Russia	15 May 1873	26 June 1945	Writer	Aelita, The Garin Death Ray, The Road to Calvary
Teodor Trayanov	Bulgaria	30 January 1882	15 January 1945	Poet	Song of songs, Regina Mortua, Hymns and Ballads
Halid Ziya Uşaklıgil	Turkey	1866	27 March 1945	Writer	
Anton Webern	Austria	3 December 1883	15 September 1945	Composer	
Franz Werfel	Austria	10 September 1890	26 August 1945	Writer	The Song of Bernadette
Charles Williams	United Kingdom	20 September 1886	15 May 1945	Writer	Descent into Hell
John R. Commons	United States	13 October 1862	11 May 1945	Economist	Institutional Economics
August Lösch	Germany	15 October 1906	30 May 1945	Economist	Die räumliche Ordnung der Wirtschaft
David Lloyd George	United Kingdom	17 January 1863	26 March 1945	Politician	The Truth About The Peace Treaty, War Memoirs
Joseph Goebbels	Germany	29 October 1897	1 May 1945	Politician	Goebbels Diaries

=== Entering the public domain in the United States ===
The Copyright Term Extension Act means no published works would enter the public domain in this jurisdiction until 2019. Only unpublished and unregistered works whose authors died in 1945 enter the public domain.

On January 16, 2016, a judge decided that a selfie picture taken by a monkey automatically falls in the public domain.

== Works entering in public domain in 2016 by media ==
=== Books ===
- A Voyage to Arcturus by David Lindsay
- Sidney, Philip and His Wife, The Awakening of Helena Richie, The Iron Woman, The Rising Tide by Margaret Deland.
- Paulicéia Desvairada, Macunaíma by Mário de Andrade
- Aşk-ı Memnu, Kırık Hayatlar by Halid Ziya Uşaklıgil
- Bambi, a Life in the Woods, Bambi's Children, Josephine Mutzenbacher, The Hound of Florence, Fünf Minuten Amerika, Perri by Felix Salten.
- Red Plague Poem by Józef Szczepański
- Journey by Moonlight by Antal Szerb
- The Diary of a Young Girl by Anne Frank
- A Child of the Jago by Arthur Morrison
- Collection of Poems. 1889–1903 and Collection of Poems. Book 2. 1903-1909 by Zinaida Gippius
- Mein Kampf by Adolf Hitler
- Sister Carrie, Jennie Gerhardt, The Financier, The Titan, The "Genius", An American Tragedy, Chains: Lesser Novels and Stories, The Bulwark, The Stoic by Theodore Dreiser.
- The Worm Ouroboros by E. R. Eddison

=== Images ===
- Winter by Vilhelms Purvītis

=== Music ===
- Six string quartets and Cantata Profana by Béla Bartók.
- Variations for piano, op. 27, String Quartet, Op. 28, Concerto for Nine Instruments, Op. 24 by Anton Webern.
- Prelude in E minor, BWV 855a by Alexander Siloti
- Music of Le Pavillon d'Armide Ballet by Nikolai Tcherepnin
- You Made Me Love You (I Didn't Want to Do It) by James V. Monaco and Joseph McCarthy.

== See also ==
- List of countries' copyright lengths
- Public Domain Day
- Creative Commons
- Public Domain
- Over 300 public domain authors available in Wikisource (any language), with descriptions from Wikidata
- 1945 in literature, 1955 in literature, 1965 in literature and 1975 in literature
