= Vladimir Zlobin =

Vladimir Ananievich Zlobin (Владимир Ананьевич Злобин, 1894 (Saint Petersburg)-1967 (Paris)) was a Russian symbolist poet and secretary for Zinaida Gippius.

As a student, Zlobin was a member of a poets' group where he met Gippius. He emigrated from Russia in 1919 together with Gippius and her husband Dmitriy Sergeyevich Merezhkovsky, first to Poland and then to France where all three lived in one flat. Some scholars believe he had a sexual relationship with Gippius, although this is not mentioned in his memoir about Gippius, Difficult Soul. In the correspondence between Gippius and Zlobin, the two played with gender ambiguity in the Russian language. He wrote about a fantasy of sleeping with her.

In 1927-1928 he was the head of a journal "New Ship" together with Yuri Terapiano. He then worked on different projects for Gippius and helped to organise, in his Paris flat, "Sundays" for Russian poets and writers.

== Works ==
- A Difficult Soul: Zinaida Gippius. University of California Press, 1980.
- Literature diary: Articles// Возрождение. — 1958—1960. — pp. 80–100.
