= The Awakening of Helena Richie (film) =

1916 silent film directed by John W. Noble

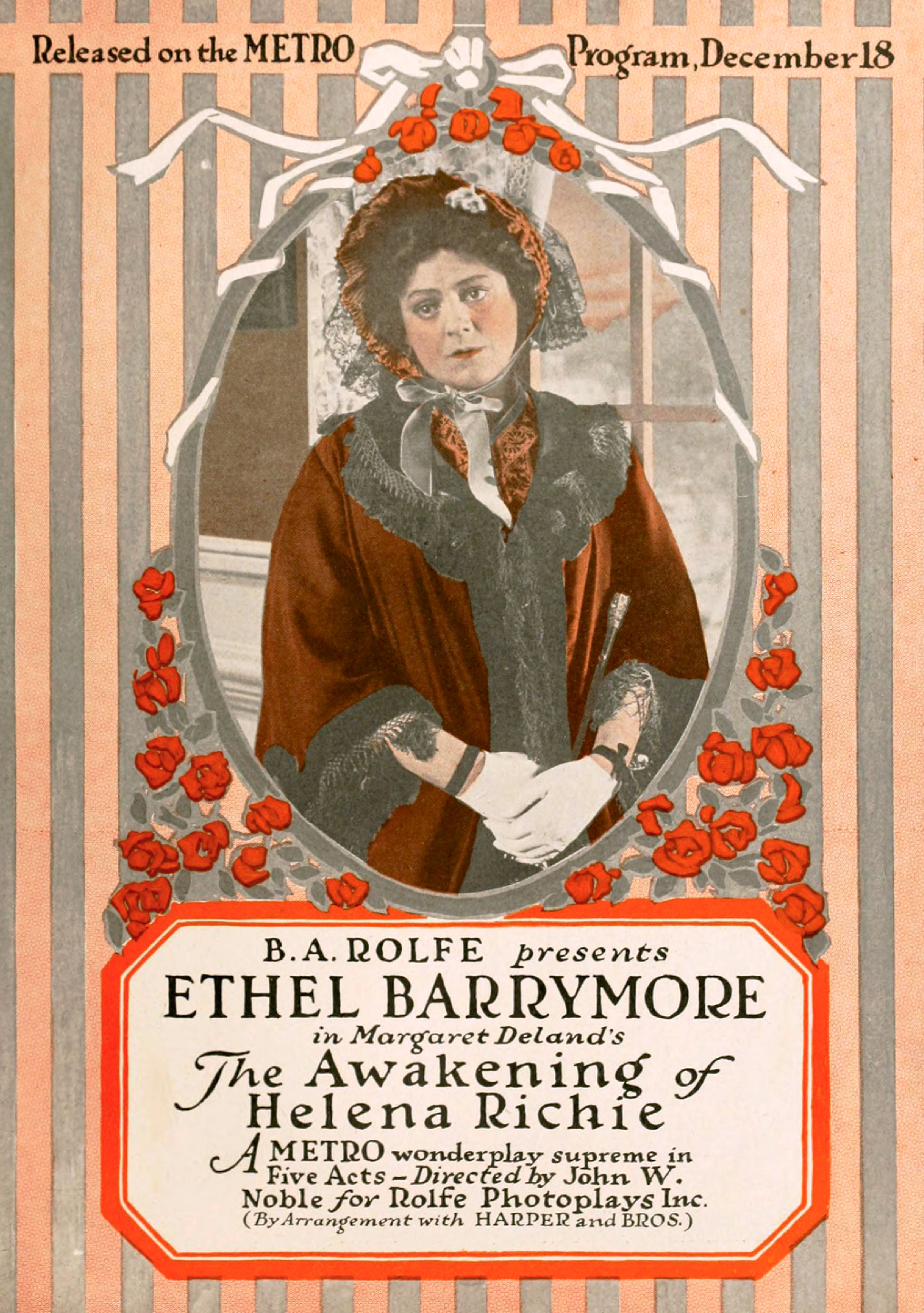
- Advertisement
- Directed by: John W. Noble
- Written by: John W. Noble (film scenario)
- Based on: The Awakening of Helena Richie by Margaret Deland and the play adaptation by Charlotte Thompson
- Produced by: B. A. Rolfe
- Starring: Ethel Barrymore
- Cinematography: H. O. Carleton
- Distributed by: Metro Pictures
- Release date: December 18, 1916
- Running time: 5 reels
- Country: United States
- Language: Silent (English intertitles)

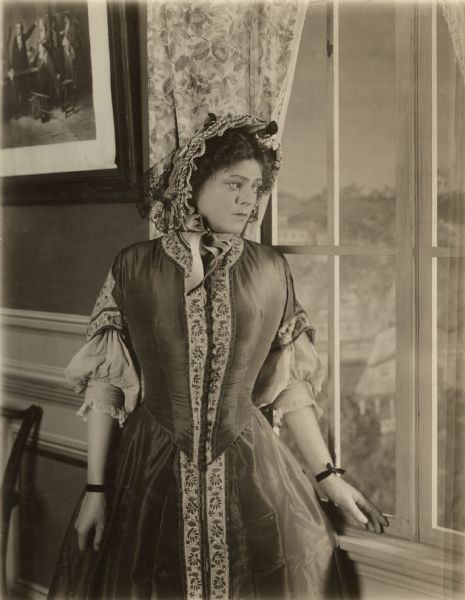
Publicity photograph for the film.

The Awakening of Helena Richie is a surviving 1916 American silent drama film produced by B. A. Rolfe and distributed by Metro Pictures. It is based on the 1906 novel, The Awakening of Helena Richie, by Margaret Deland and the 1909 Broadway play based on the novel starring Margaret Anglin and then child actor Raymond Hackett.

This silent film version brings Ethel Barrymore to the Helena Richie role (as Anglin refused to do films) and Barrymore's surname meant better business in the movie world. This film still survives incomplete in the Library of Congress and was reputed to be Barrymore's favorite of her silent film work.

Actor Robert Cummings also played his same part in the 1909 Broadway play.

== Cast ==
- Ethel Barrymore - Helena Richie
- Robert Cummings - Lloyd Pryor
- Frank Montgomery - Benjamin Wright
- James A. Furey - Dr. Lavendar (*J.A. Furey)
- Maurice Steuart - Little David
- Hassan Mussalli - Sam Wright
- William A. Williams - Deacon Wright (*William Williams)
- Robert Whittier - Frederick Richie
- Charles Goodrich - Dr. King
- Hattie Delaro - Mrs. King
- Mary Asquith - Mrs. Wright
- Kathleen Townsend -
- James Sheridan - David as an infant (uncredited)

== Production ==
Filming began in mid-October, 1916 at the Metro studios and was completed by mid-November, 1916.

== See also ==
- Ethel Barrymore on stage, screen and radio
