= Collection of Poems. 1889–1903 =

Book of poetry by Zinaida Gippius

- Author: Zinaida Gippius
- Original title: Собрание стихов. 1889–1903
- Language: Russian
- Genre: Russian Symbolism
- Publisher: Scorpion, 1903
- Publication place: Russian Empire
- Media type: Print (hardback & paperback)
- Followed by: Collection of Poems. Book 2. 1903-1909

Collection of Poems. 1889–1903 (Russian: Собрание стихов. 1889–1903) is the first book of poetry by Zinaida Gippius and collected 97 of her early poems. It was published in October 1903 (the date on the cover was given as 1904) by the Scorpion Publishing house.

Instrumental in the publication was Scorpion's representative, poet Valery Bryusov with whom Gippius had corresponded regularly since 1902, while compiling the collection, adding new poems and continuously changing their order.

It came out with a foreword by Gippius called "Neobkhodimoye o stikhakh" (The Essential Things About Poetry) which appeared a month earlier as a short essay in Novy Put (1903, No. 9) and was later included in the compilation Anton Krainy (Z. Gippius). Literary Diary (1899-1907), published in 1908 by M.V. Pirozhkov Publishers.

== Poems ==
- Pesnya (Песня, Song)
- Posvyashcheniye (Посвящение, Dedication)
- Otrada (Отрада, Joy)
- Ballada. Syryye prokhody... (Баллада. Сырые проходы..., The Ballad. Wet passages...)
- Nikogda (Никогда, Never)
- Bessilye (Бессилье, Powerlessness)
- Snezhnye khlopya (Снежные хлопья, Snowflakes)
- Sonet. Ne strashno mne prikosnovenye stali... (Сонет. Не страшно мне прикосновенье стали..., The Sonnet. I'm not afraid of the touch of steel...)
- Tsvety nochi (Цветы ночи, Flowers of the Night)
- Griselda (Гризельда)
- Odnoobraziye (Однообразие, Sameness)
- Idi za mnoi (Иди за мной, Follow Me Down)
- Osen (Осень, Autumn)
- K prudu (К пруду, To the Pond)
- Krik (Крик, Scream)
- Lyubov - odna (Любовь — одна, There's Just One Love)
- Sentimentalnoye stikhotvoreniye (Сентиментальное стихотворение, Sentimental Poem)
- Ty lyubish? (Ты любишь?, You Love?)
- Nadpis na knige (Надпись на книге, Book Inscription)
- Rodina (Родина, Motherland)
- Sonet. Odin ya v kelii neosveshchyuonnoi... (Сонет. Один я в келии неосвещенной..., A Sonnet. I am alone in a dark cell...)
- Vechernyaya zarya (Вечерняя заря, Sunset)
- Pyl' (Пыль, Dust)
- Vecher (Вечер, Evening)
- Molitva (Молитва, Prayer)
- Serenade (Серенада)
- Sneg (Снег, Snow)
- Apelsinnye tsvety (Апельсинные цветы, Orange-colour Flower)
- Lestnitsa (Лестница, Staircase)
- Ulybka (Улыбка, Smile)
- Mgnoveniye (Мгновение, A Moment)
- Krugi (Круги, Circles)
- Posledneye (Последнее, My Last One)
- Progulka vdvoyom (Прогулка вдвоем, A Walk for Two)
- Soblazn (Соблазн, Temptation)
- Stuk (Стук, Knocking)
- Tam (Там, There)
- Lyubov (Любовь, Love)
- Konets (Конец, The End)
- Dar. Ni o chyom prost tebya ne smeyu... (Дар. Ни о чем я Тебя просить не смею..., The Gift. I Dare Ask You Nothing)
- Neskorbnomu uchitelyu (Нескорбному Учителю, For Unmournful Teacher)
- Predel (Предел, The Limit)
- Khristu (Христу, To Christ)
- Tikhoye plamya (Тихое пламя, Quiet Flame)
- Myortvaya zarya (Мертвая заря, Deadly Dawn)
- Glukhota (Глухота, Deafness)
- Pesni rusalok (Песни русалок, Songs of Mermaids)
- Do dna (До дна, To the Bottom)
- V gostinoi (В гостиной, In a Parlour)
- Elektrichestvo (Электричество, Electricity)
- Lugovye lyutiki (Луговые лютики, Meadow Buttercups)
- Zemlya. Minuta bessilya (Земля. Минута бессилья..., Earth. A moment of weakness...)
- Krov (Кровь, Blood)
- Istina ili schastye? (Истина или счастье?, Truth or Happiness?)
- Ne znayu (Не знаю, Don't Know)
- Khristianin (Христианин, The Christian)
- Drugoi khristianin} (Другой христианин, Another Christian)
- Ya («Я», Me)
- Predsmertnaya ispoved khristianina (Предсмертная исповедь христианина, Christian's Deathbed Confessions)
- Kak vse (Как все, Like Everybody)
- Smirennost (Смиренность, Humility)
- O drugom (О другом, Of Other Things)
- Strakh i smert (Страх и смерть, Fear and Death)
- Shveya (Швея, Seamstress)
- Ograda (Ограда, Fence)
- Sosny (Сосны, Pines)
- Sny (Сны Dreams)
- Tetrad lyubvi (Тетрадь любви, Notebook of Love)
- Dva soneta (Два сонета, Two Sonnets)
- Vmeste (Вместе, Together)
- Shto yest grekh? (Что есть грех?, What Is Sin?)
- Starikovy rechi (Стариковы речи, Old Man's Talk)
- Potselui (Поцелуй, Kiss)
- Pjavki (Пьявки, Leeches)
- Muchenitsa (Мученица, Martyr)
- Chasy stoyat (Часы стоят, The Clock Is Stopped)
- Almaz (Алмаз, Diamond)
- Chisla (Числа, Numbers)
- Trinadtsat (13)
- Merezhi (Мережи, Dragnet)
- Nagiye mysli (Нагие мысли, Naked Thoughts)
- O vere (О вере, On Belief)
- Bozhja tvar (Божья тварь, God's Creature)
- Kostyor (Костер, Bonfire)
- Strany unyniya (Lands of Doom)
- Protivorechiya (Противоречия, Contradictions)
- Luna i tuman (Луна и туман, Moon and Fog)
- Nichevo (Ничего, Nothing)
- Opustoshenye (Опустошение, Devastation)
- Boginya (Богиня, Goddess)
- Nyet (Нет, No)
- Soobshchniki (Сообщники, Accomplices)
- Ballada. Mostki yest v sadu... (Баллада. Мостки есть в саду, на пруду, в камышах..., The Ballad. There's a bridge in the garden, on the pond...)
- Zelyonoye, zhyoltoye i goluboye (Зеленое, желтое и голубое, Green, Yellow and Blue)
- Pauki (Пауки, Spiders)
- Tsep (Цепь, Chain)
- Belaya odezhda (Белая одежда, White Gown)

== Reception ==
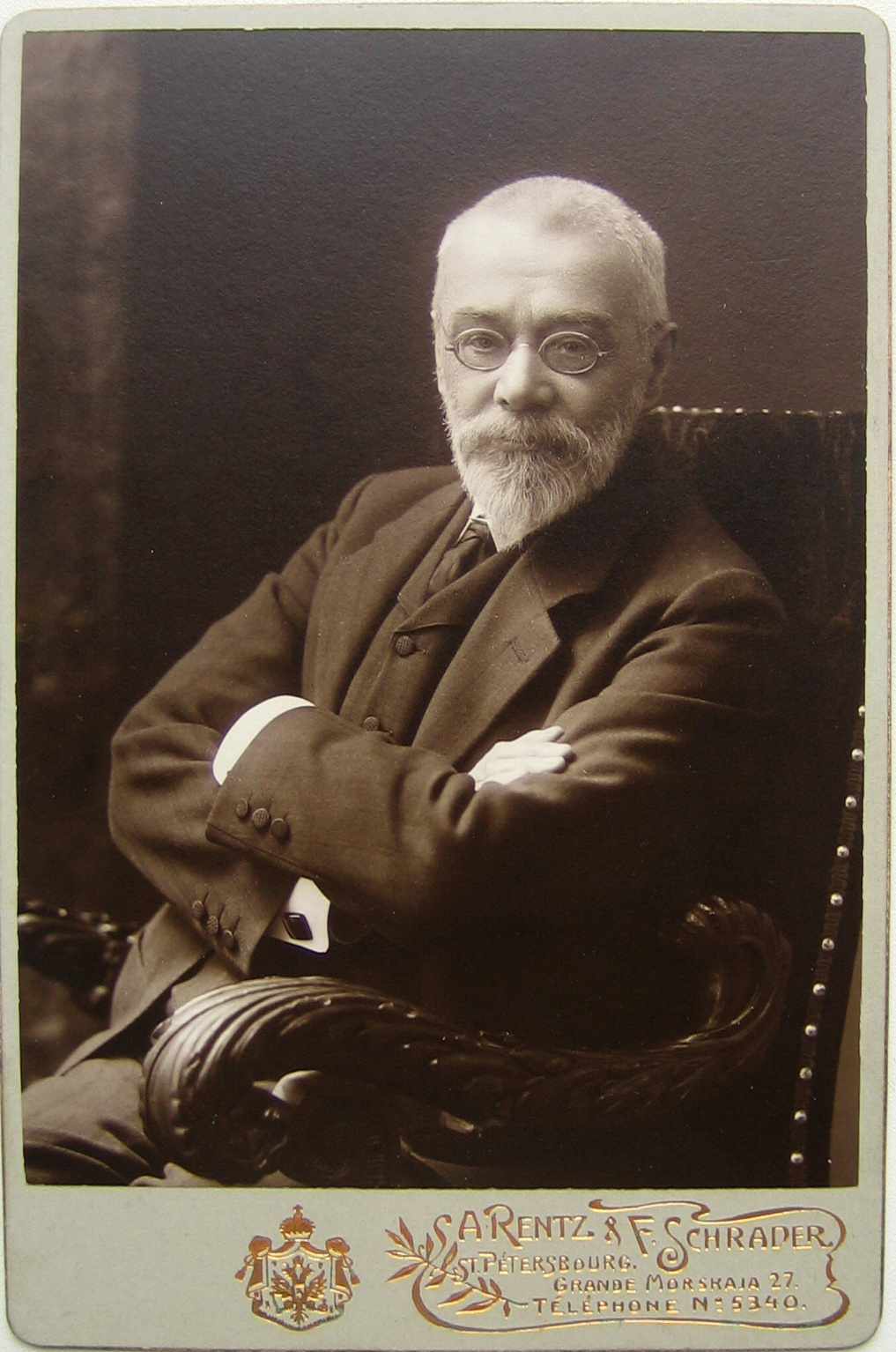
The Russian nationalist Mikhail Menshikov admired 'some lovely lines' but detested the way they were buried under the barrage of dissonant, 'ugly and deranged, rudely deformed' stanzas.

In retrospect Gippius' debut book of poetry has been regarded as the major event in Russian cultural and literary life. "Gippius the poet holds her special place in the Russian literature; her poems are deeply intellectual, immaculate in form and genuinely exciting," the Brockhaus and Efron Encyclopedic Dictionary wrote in the early 1910s. Critics praised her originality, virtuosity of a wordsmith and called her the "true heir of Baratynsky's muse".

Upon its release, though, The Collection of Poems. 1889–1903 was unanimously praised only by a small group of art and literary critics belonging to the Modernist group (held derogatively as 'decadents' by detractors) and almost unanimously panned by those belonging to the 'traditionalist' camp. The latter, who were in the majority (and for a rare occasion united critics from all sides of the political specter, including the left radicals and the right-wing conservatives), attacked both Gippius and the 'new Art' in general.

The Marxist critic and philosopher Vladimir Shulyatikov described The Collected Poems. 1889–1903 as the 'artistic failure' of the author who's found herself "confused by the life process." The conservative author Mikhail Menshikov, writing for Severny Vestnik, admitted there were 'some lovely lines' in Gippius' poetry, but disliked the way they were buried under the barrage of dissonant, 'ugly and deranged, rudely deformed' stanzas.

The anonymous author of the Russkaya Mysl review saw Gippius's poems as "either musings (what about, is usually hard to say) cast in uneasy forms, or occasional images, vaguely unpleasant." Angel Bogdanovich labeled the author "a narcissistic decadent... coquettish, mannered and playful," who was engaged in "buffoonery bordering on indecent mockery." Pyotr Yakubovich in Russkoye Bogatstvo wrote: "Our poetess is quick to profess her love for herself, God and the Devil; it is only the people that she invariably despises." As for her 'fake religiosity', as he put it, it amounted to "a mere version of those decadent versifiers' affectation that drove them to sing paeans to the devil, the evil, vileness and harlotry," he opined.

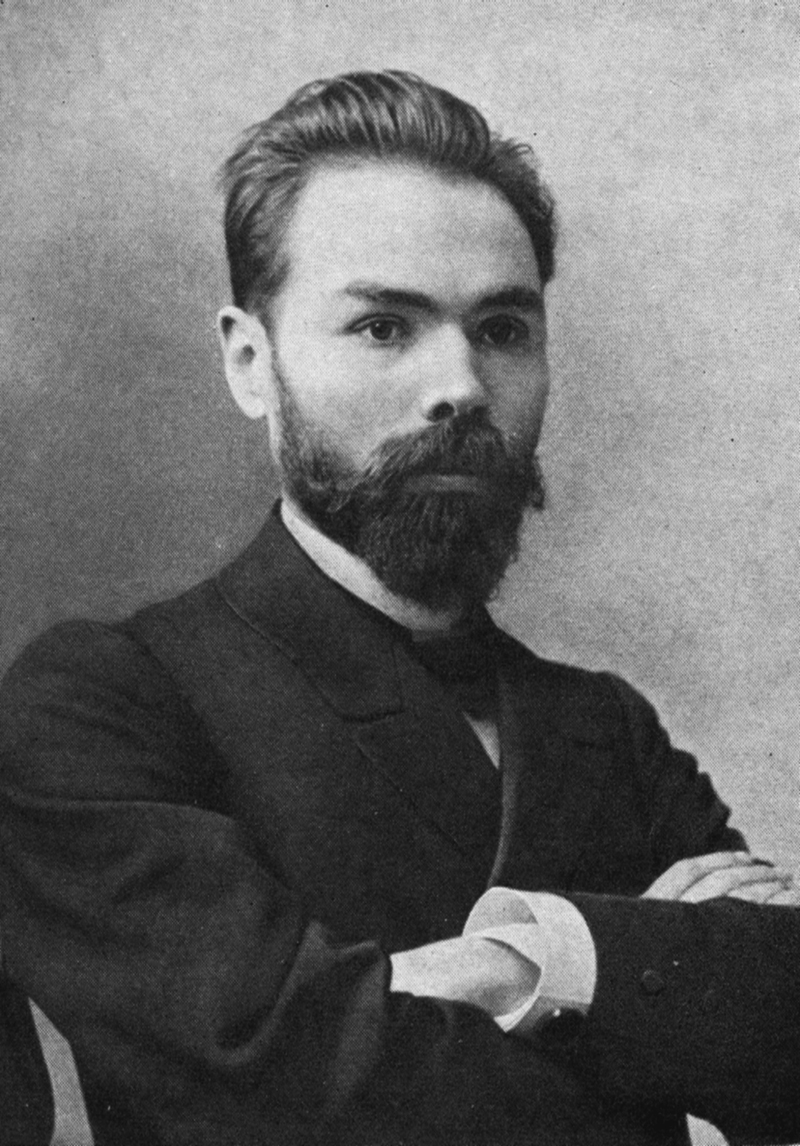
The poet Valery Bryusov lauded the "insurmountable frankness" with which Gippius "document[ed] the emotional progress of her enslaved soul."

Some of the critics belonging to the 'traditionalist' camp were more generous. Alexander Lovyagin compared Gippius' religious poems to the Jewish Cabalistic writings and still thought "most of them... [to be] convincing and impressive". Poet and dramatist Nikolai Ventsel, while dismissing some pieces as 'consciously obscure' praised others ("Electricity", "Griselda") for highlighting the author's ability "to express in lucid imagery a concept, no matter how abstract." On the whole, though, Ventsel remained unconvinced, describing Gippius as a poet who tends to "pray, while smartening herself up coquettishly."

Of all the mainstream reviews the most balanced is considered to be that of the poet and critic Alexander Izmaylov who in his essay "The Mystical Poetry of the 20th Century" gave the book a positive review, calling its poems the "sincere and noble searching of an inquisitive spirit, having nothing to do with the low-brow quackery which the first-wave decadents were feeding us with." According to Izmaylov, the book presented "most intimate ideas and feelings of the most intimate of all our poets..." It was, he opined, "a book for the few" focusing "with rare clarity the most peculiar mystical worldview combining elements of Buddhism and Christianity, closely intertwined."

Critics of the Symbolist camp were unanimous in their praise. Valery Bryusov lauded the "insurmountable frankness with which she document[ed] the emotional progress of her enslaved soul."

The poet and critic Nikolai Y. Abramovich in an essay "The Lyric of Z.N. Gippius" hailed the author's integrity and originality, asserting: "these firmness and elegance, vividly beautiful, spiritual and captivating in its inner chastity, firmness and elegance... [are] inimitable." "Gippius' poetry is a small, austere, quiet twilight chapel where the Godly life abides, deeply focused, silent and unseen," he wrote.

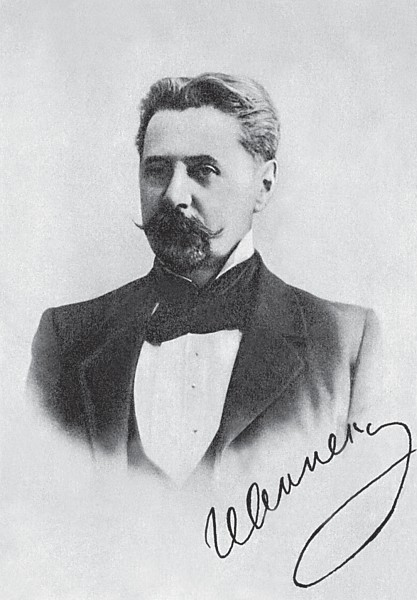
For the poet Innokenty Annensky the book represented the peak of Russia’s fifteen years of Symbolism.

Equally rapturous was the poet and critic (later, a well-known chess player and historian of literature) Alexander Smirnov who marveled at the way the poet "cast light upon our darkest and most uneasy passions," and "unveiled the mysteries of reality, transforming them into revelations." This "religious contemplation (for want of a better word) fills almost the whole book and is expressed the best where there is not a word about God," he noted. Comparing the book with to the works contemporary impressionists poetry, Smirnov remarked: "Z. Gippius, unlike them, lets her imagery develop fully and only then gives it beautiful, exquisite shape. Could this be called artfulness? I'd call it 'another sincerity'. It is what makes both these poems and their form, seem so mature and deep."

Poet and critic Nikolai Poyarkov used the debut Collection of Poems as an occasion for tracing down Gippius' development ('from sticky atheism to Christianity', as he put it) and found her earlier 'decadent' pieces artistically more interesting than her later religious poems. "The God-searching poems are cold, dry and un-prayer-like. Logical and schematic, they lack the true sinner's yell, this passion of the one at crossroads, longing for God. Their mannerisms and pretentiousness would rather appeal to a pure esthete, than a true Christian believer... Old pieces are better, they were really sincere prayers and in them Gippius's soul resonates richly, full of tiny nuances."

Writing in 1909, critic Modest Hoffmann too made a lot of the ambiguous side of her poetry. "Z.Gippius's works present a bizarre amalgam of the [spiritual] quest's sincerity, disarming powerlessness, pretentiousness, icy cold haughtiness and universal disdain, spiced with motives of humility and very peculiar sentimentalism," he wrote.

Also in 1909, Innokenty Annensky lauded the author’s special way of half-spokenness, 'hint and pause' metaphor technique, and the art of "extracting sonorous chords out of silent pianos", calling the book the peak of Russia's 15 years of modernism and arguing that "not a single man would ever be able to dress abstractions into clothes of such charm [as this woman]."
