= Chains: Lesser Novels and Stories =

Collection of short stories by Theodore Dreiser

- First edition
- Author: Theodore Dreiser
- Language: English
- Genre: Short stories
- Publisher: Boni & Liveright
- Publication date: 1927
- Publication place: United States

Chains: Lesser Novels and Stories is a collection of short stories by Theodore Dreiser, first published in 1927.

== Contents ==
The fifteen short stories in the collection are:

- "Sanctuary"
- "The Hand"
- "Chains"
- "St. Columba and the River"
- "Convention"
- "Khat"
- "Typhoon"
- "The Old Neighborhood"
- "Phantom Gold"
- "Marriage—For One"
- "Fulfilment"
- "The Victor" (aka Victory)
- "The Shadow"
- "The "Mercy" of God"
- "A Prince Who Was a Thief"

== Literary significance and criticism ==
Chains was Dreiser's second collection of short stories. It sold 12,000 copies in the first year, which has been deemed to have been a moderate success.

Carl Van Doren described the stories as 'powerful'.
