= Philip and His Wife =

1894 novel by Margaret Deland

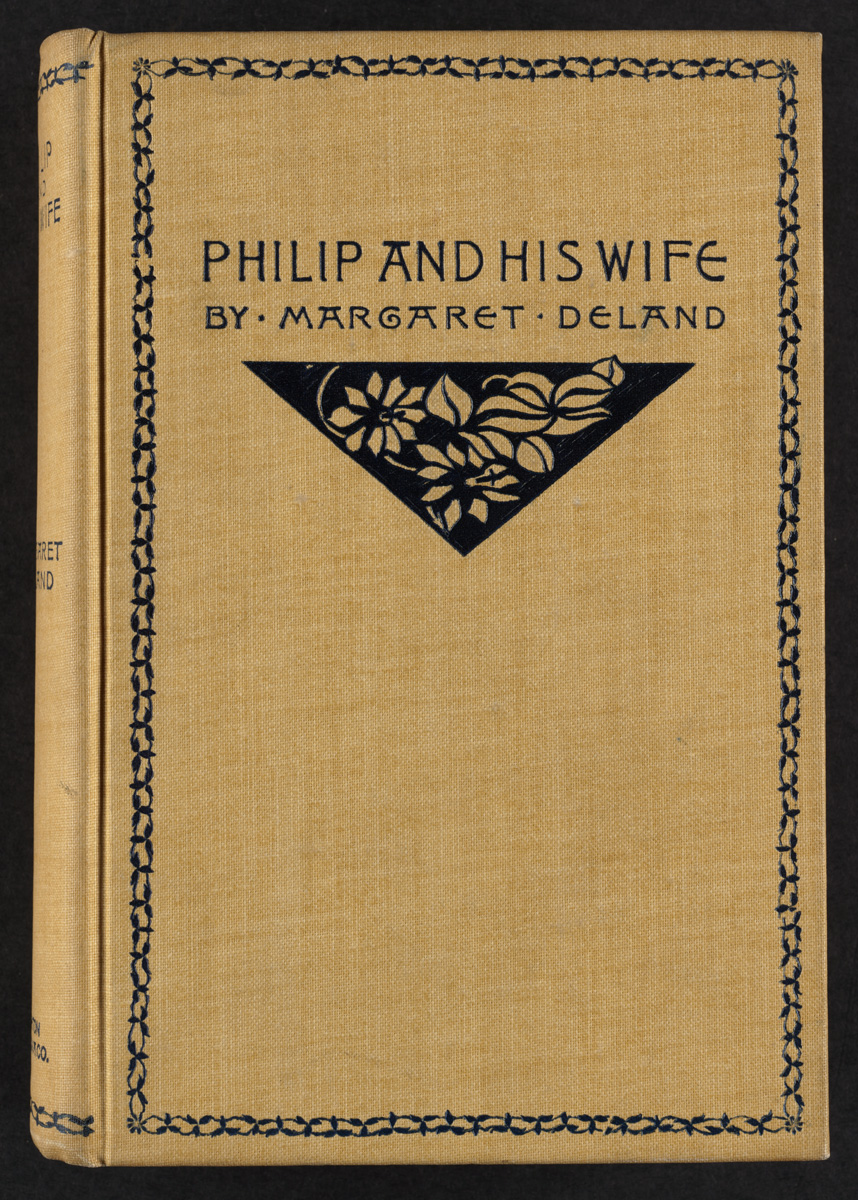
- Author: Margaret Deland
- Language: English
- Genre: Novel
- Publisher: Houghton, Mifflin and Company
- Publication date: 1894
- Publication place: United States
- Media type: Print (Hardback)
- Pages: 438
- OCLC: 959019

Philip and His Wife is a novel by the American writer Margaret Deland (1857–1945) set in the 19th century fictional locale of Old Chester, a fictional Western Pennsylvania rural village near Pittsburgh.

== Overview ==
The novel tells the story of Philip and Cecil Shore, whose marriage is a failure, and the book explores the complications of divorce and morality among the middle classes.

The novel was first published in installments in The Atlantic Monthly from January through October 1894.

The book features the first appearance of Deland's character Dr. Lavendar, who ultimately appears in six of her books.

The theme of divorce was a controversial one in the mid 1890s when the book was published and a bold choice by Deland for her third novel. The story does not provide a resolution for the couple seeking divorce but does carefully trace their unhappiness, which is veiled through the mask of conventional attitudes of the period.
