= Margaret Deland =

American writer and poet (1857–1945)

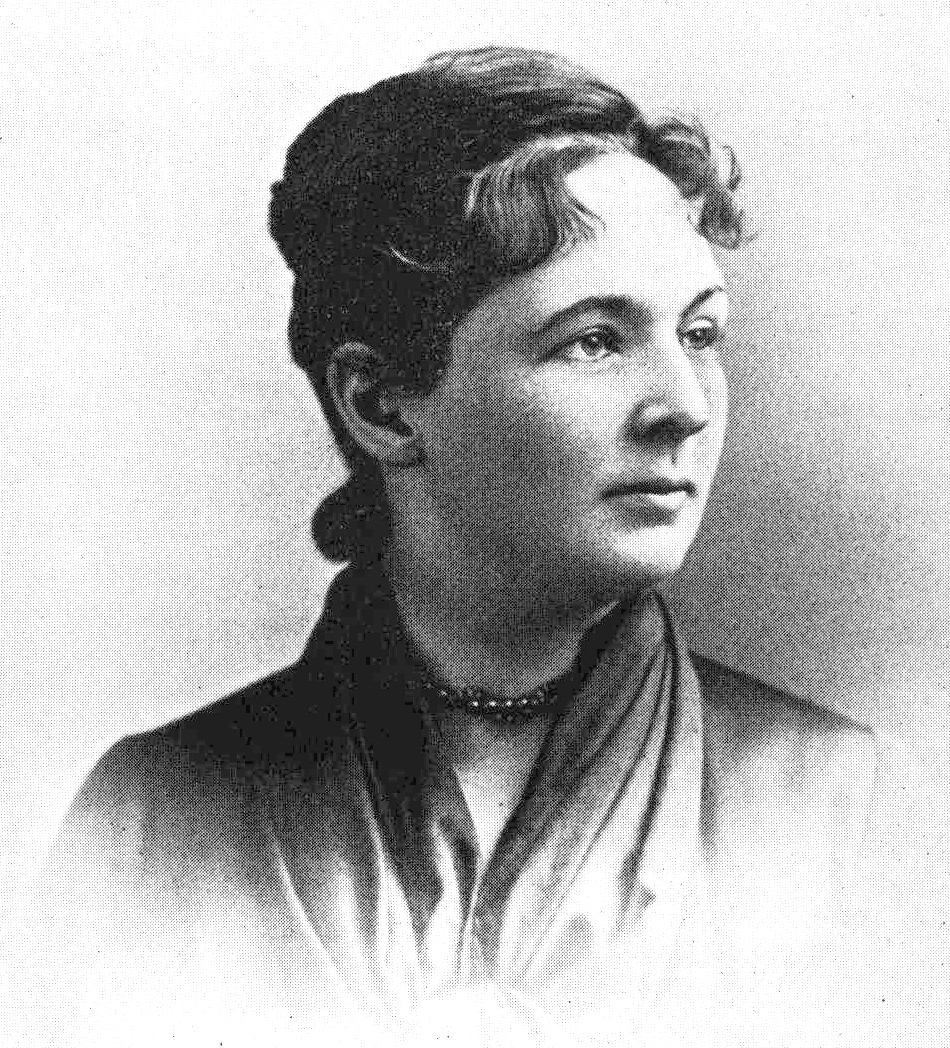
- Deland sometime before 1894
- Born: Margaretta Wade Campbell; February 23, 1857; Allegheny, Pennsylvania
- Died: January 13, 1945 (aged 87); Boston, Massachusetts
- Occupation: Writer
- Writing career
- Language: English
- Genres: Novel; short story; poetry; autobiography
- Literary movement: American Realism

Margaret Deland (born Margaretta Wade Campbell; February 23, 1857 – January 13, 1945) was an American novelist, short story writer, and poet. She also wrote an autobiography in two volumes. She generally is considered part of the literary realism movement.

== Biography ==
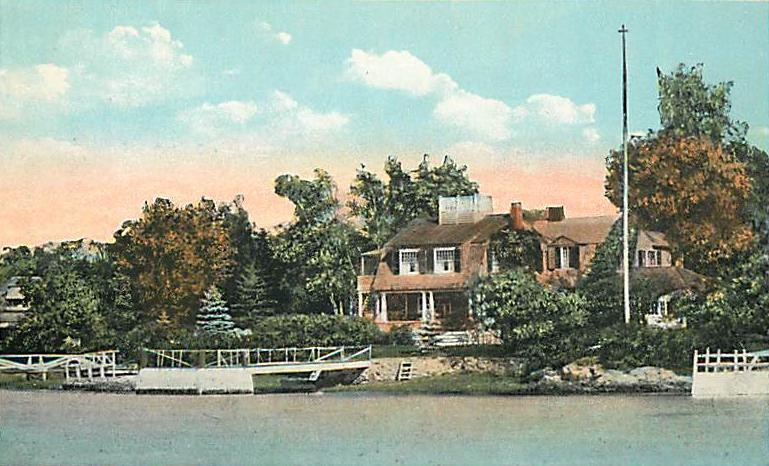
Greywood, Margaret Deland's summer home in Kennebunkport, Maine

Margaretta Wade Campbell was born in Allegheny, Pennsylvania (today a part of Pittsburgh) on February 23, 1857. Her mother died due to complications from the birth, and she was left in the care of an aunt named Lois Wade and her husband Benjamin Campbell Blake.

On May 12, 1880, she married Lorin F. Deland. Her husband had inherited his father's publishing company, which he sold in 1886 and worked in advertising. It was at this period she began to write, first writing verses for her husband's greeting-card business. Her first poem was published in the March 1885 issue of Harper's New Monthly Magazine and her first poetry collection, titled The Old Garden and Other Verses, was published in late 1886 by Houghton Mifflin. Her novel John Ward, Preacher, her first, was published in 1888.

Deland and her husband moved to Boston, Massachusetts and, over a four-year span, they took in and supported unmarried mothers at their residence at 76 Mount Vernon Street on Beacon Hill. They also maintained the summer home Greywood, overlooking the Kennebunk River in Kennebunkport, Maine. It was in this home that Canadian actress Margaret Anglin visited in 1909, and the two women reviewed Deland's manuscript for The Awakening of Helena Richie. Anglin reported "I never spent a pleasanter time than I did while Mrs. Deland and I chugged up and down the little Kennbunkport [sic] River in a boat, talking over the future of Helena Richie." The Delands kept their summer home in Maine for about 50 years.

In 1910, Deland wrote an article for the Atlantic Monthly, recognizing the ongoing struggles for women's rights in the United States: "Restlessness!" she wrote, "A prevailing discontent among women — a restlessness infinitely removed from the content of a generation ago." During World War I, Deland did relief work in France; she was awarded a cross from the Legion of Honor for her work. "She received a Litt.D. from Bates College in 1920. In 1926, she was elected to the National Institute of Arts and Letters along with Edith Wharton, Agnes Repplier and Mary Eleanor Wilkins Freeman. The election of these four women to the organization was said to have "marked the letting down of the bars to women." Deland was also a member of an informal women's social club that met regularly and included Amy Beach, Alice Howe Gibbens (wife of William James), and Ida Agassiz (wife of Henry Lee Higginson).

By 1941, Deland had published 33 books. She died in Boston at the Hotel Sheraton, where she then lived, in 1945. She is buried at Forest Hills Cemetery. Her home on Mount Vernon Street is a stop on the Boston Women's Heritage Trail.

== Critical response ==
Deland is known principally for the novel John Ward, Preacher (1888), an indictment of Calvinism, which became a best-seller. Her 'Old Chester' books, based on her early memories of the Pittsburgh communities where she grew up — including Maple Grove and Manchester — were also popular. She was recognized as an important and popular author of literary realism in the United States, but some of her plots and themes were shocking to some. In her lifetime, she was called the American Mrs. Humphry Ward and was compared to Elizabeth Gaskell.

== Selected works ==
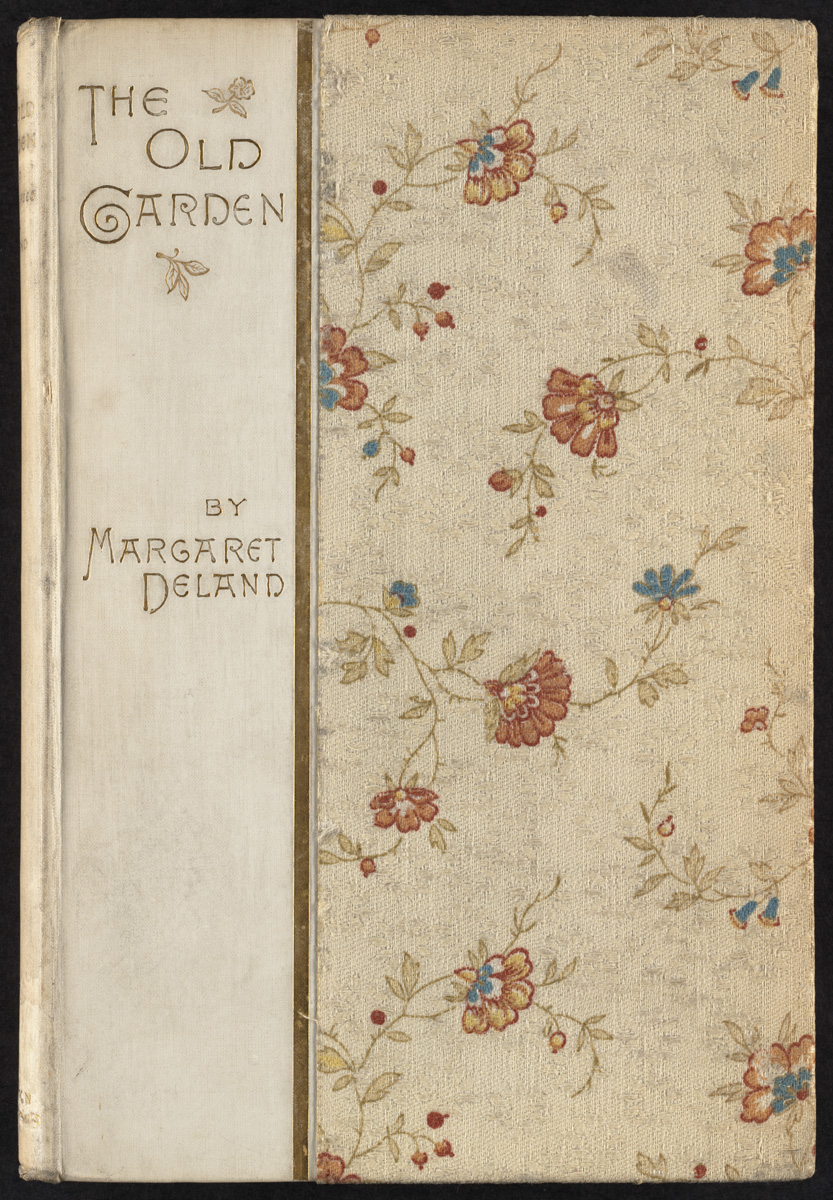
The Old Garden and Other Verses, 1886

Poetry

- The Old Garden and other verses (1886) (Internet Archive e-text)
- The Old Garden with illustrations by Walter Crane (1893)

Novels

- John Ward, Preacher (1888)
- Sidney (1890)
- The Story of a Child (1892)
- Philip and His Wife (1894)
- Dr. Lavendar's People (1903)
- The Awakening of Helena Richie (1906)
- The Way to Peace (1910)
- The Iron Woman (1911)
- The Voice (1912)
- Partners (1913)
- The Hands of Esau (1914)
- The Rising Tide (1916)
- Small Things (1919)
- The Promises of Alice (1919)
- An Old Chester Secret (1920)
- The Vehement Flame (1922)
- The Kays (1926)
- Captain Archer's Daughter (1932)

Short story collections

- Mr. Tommy Dove, and Other Stories (1893)
- The Wisdom of Fools (1897)
- Old Chester Tales (1898)
- The Common Way (1904)
- R.J.'s Mother and Some Other People (1908)
- Around Old Chester (1915)
- Small Things (1919)
- New Friends in Old Chester (1924)
- Old Chester Days (1935)

Autobiography

- If This Be I, as I Suppose It Be (1935)
- Golden Yesterdays (1941)

Other nonfiction

- Florida Days (1889)

== Filmography ==
- The Iron Woman, directed by Carl Harbaugh (1916, based on the novel The Iron Woman)
- The Awakening of Helena Richie, directed by John W. Noble (1916, based on the novel The Awakening of Helena Richie)
- Smouldering Fires, directed by Clarence Brown (1925)
