= James Leatham =

British author and social reformer (1865–1945)

James Leatham MBE JP
- Born: 19 December 1865; Aberdeen
- Died: 14 December 1945 (aged 79)
- Occupations: Socialist, Author, Social Reformer, Journalist
- Years active: 1897-1945
- Known for: Concept of Co-operative Commonwealth

James Leatham (1865–1945) was a 19th/20th century British socialist author and social reformer who devised a system of selective nationalisation. He is seen as a socialist pioneer.

In 1890 he began publishing The Workers Herald, Scotland's first socialist newspaper.

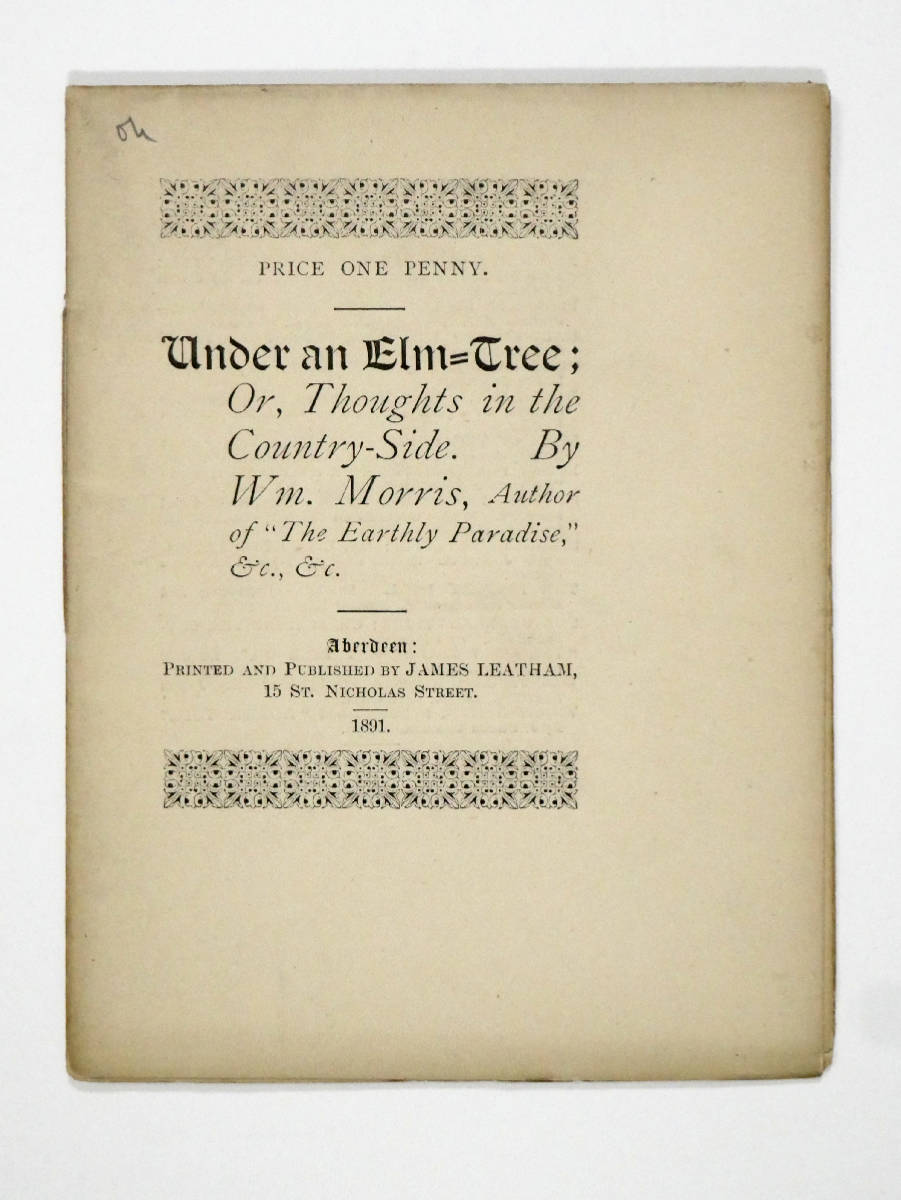
cover of an 1891 penny pamphlet by William Morris published in Aberdeen by James Leatham

His book "The Most Important Thing in the World" (through accident rather than design), lays out the pattern of British social control which evolved in the later 20th century (but then evolved away from his principles): with local bodies running local services; but railways, national roads, mines etc. run on a nationalised basis. He called this system a Co-operative commonwealth.

== Life ==
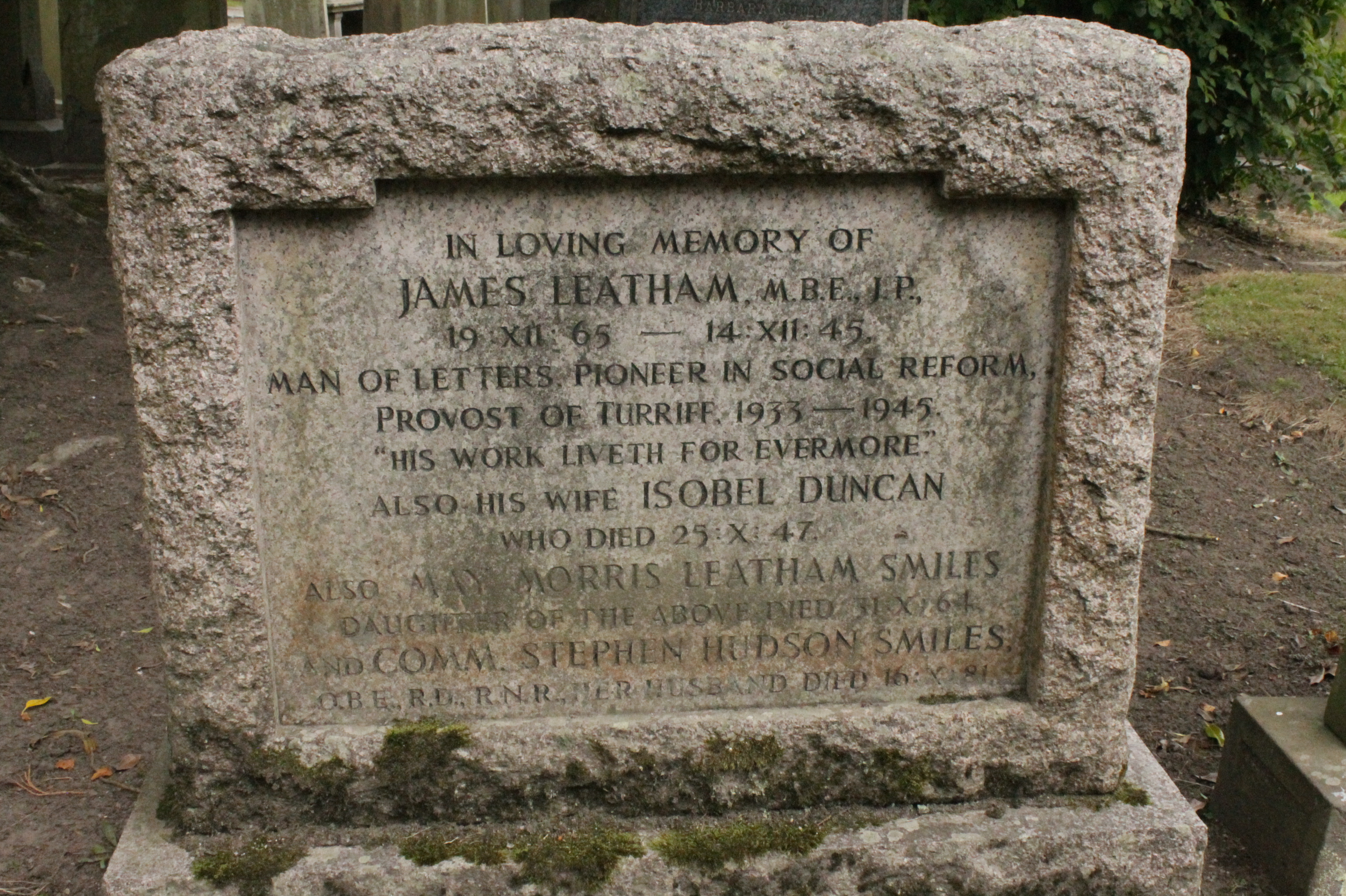
The grave of James Leatham, St Machar's Cathedral

He was born at 32 Forbes Street in Aberdeen on 19 December 1865. He never knew his father, a Yorkshireman serving with the East India Company as a soldier, who died of cholera in India before James was born. As his "father" left for India over 9 months before his birth his birth certificate records him as "illegitimate". James and his four older siblings were raised by his mother, Margaret Catanach, in the home of her father, a weaver and Chartist.

In 1879 they moved to 12 Short Loanings in Aberdeen. He was apprenticed as a printer around 1880. He worked as a compositor in the north of England and in Peterhead. In 1897 he founded and was editor of the "Peterhead Sentinel", a local newspaper. Later in Yorkshire he founded the "Cottingham Press", which published "The Gateway" from 1912 until 1945, a monthly magazine aimed at Scots at home and abroad. Regular contributors to "The Gateway" included Ramsay MacDonald, May Morris and Lord Boothby.

From 1911 to 1913 he lived at 68 Schoolhill in Aberdeen, where a plaque is now erected in his memory.

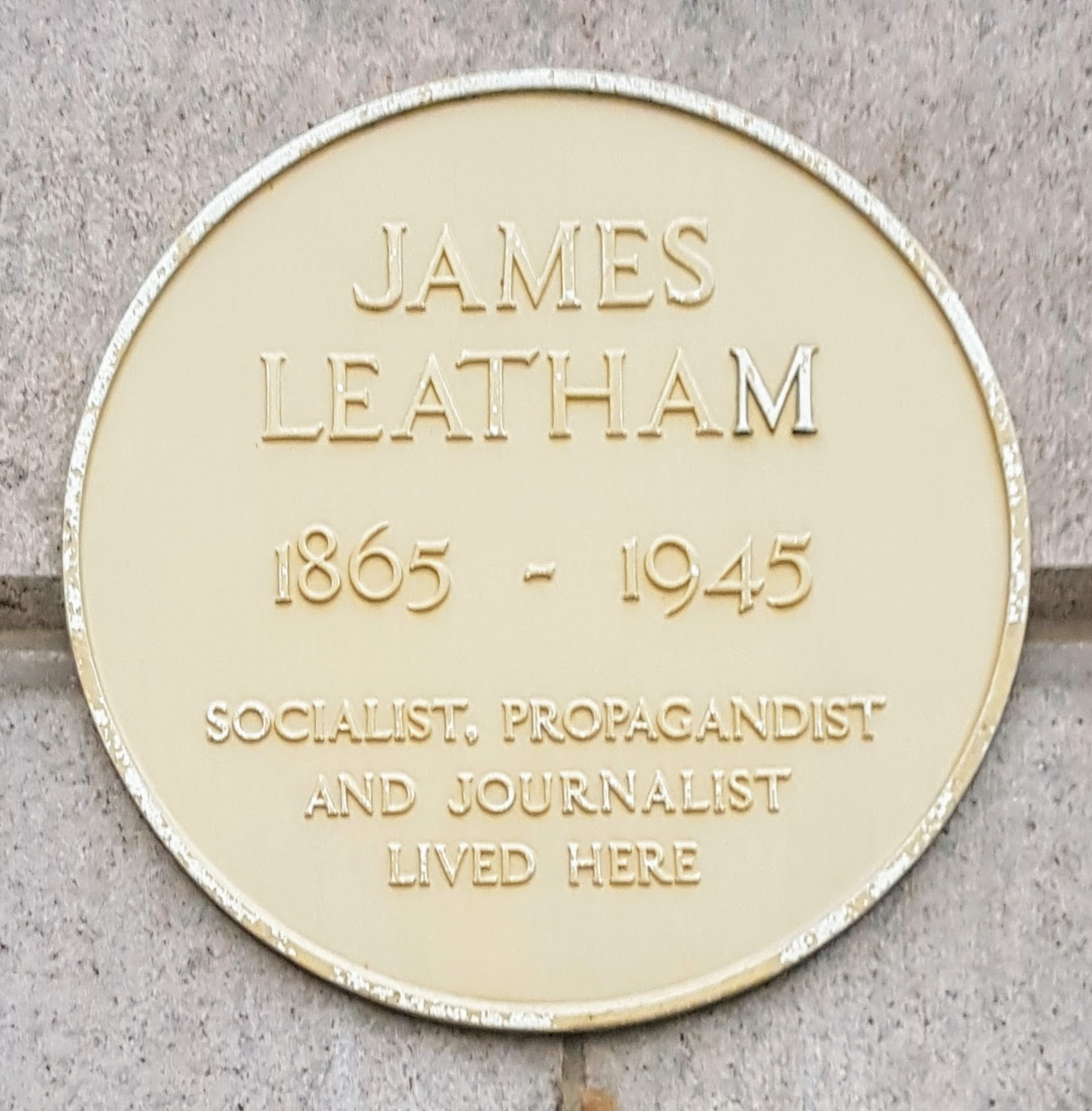
Yellow plaque marking residence on Schoolhill of James Leatham, Social reformer

He spent his final years in Turriff running the Deveron Press. He joined Turriff Town Council in 1923 and served as Provost of Turriff from 1933 until death.

He died on 14 December 1945 a few days before his 80th birthday.

== Publications ==
Over and above his own printing he was a regular contributor to the Aberdeen Press & Journal. He was author of numerous books:

- Petri Promontorium: Peterhead and the Howes o' Buchan (1901)
- Daavit: the True Story of a Personage (biography of David Scott)
- The Style of Louis Stevenson

== Family ==
James was married to Isobel Duncan (d.1947). They had four daughters: May Morris Leatham (1888-1964), Jeanne Duncan Leatham (1890-1918), Mabel Marguerite Leatham (1892-1977), and Grace (1893-1967). His daughter May Morris Leatham, who was named after William Morris' daughter, married Commander Stephen Hudson Smiles RNR. Jeannie married George Edward Hay. Her tragically early death left 2 small children who were taken by their father to Australia, something which caused James and Isobel great sadness. Mabel married James Aiken, a printer like Mabel's father. They emigrated to Canada where they became involved in local theatre and the labour movement. They did return to Scotland with their own two children for visits. Grace married Robert Crombie.
