= Sidney (novel) =

1890 novel by Margaret Deland

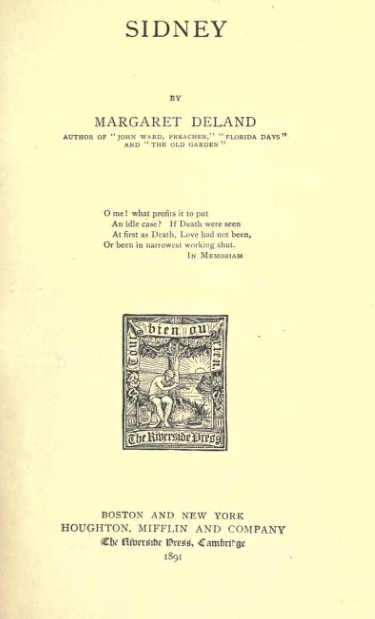
- Title page for Sidney (1891)
- Author: Margaret Deland
- Language: English
- Genre: Novel
- Publisher: Houghton, Mifflin and Company
- Publication date: 1890
- Publication place: United States
- Media type: Print (Hardback)
- Pages: 429
- OCLC: 1001764

Sidney is a philosophical novel by the American writer Margaret Deland (1857–1945) set in the 19th century fictional locale of Mercer, an Ohio River community that represents Pittsburgh, Pennsylvania.

The novel tells the story of Major Mortimer Lee and his daughter Sidney. The Major has turned a pessimist by the loss of his beloved wife, and he vows to protect his daughter from love and marriage and the notion of a beneficent God. His unmarried sister Sally helps raise her.

It was first published in installments in Atlantic Monthly from January through October 1890. It was published as a book by Houghton Mifflin but was not as popular as Deland's previous novel, John Ward.
