= Collection of Poems. Book 2. 1903–1909 =

- Author: Zinaida Gippius
- Original title: Собрание стихов. Книга 2. 1903–1909
- Language: Russian
- Genre: Russian Symbolism
- Publisher: Musaget (Мусагет) Publishers, 1910
- Publication place: Russian Empire
- Media type: Print (hardback & paperback)
- Preceded by: Collection of Poems. 1889–1903

Collection of Poems. Book 2. 1903–1909 (Russian: Собрание стихов. Книга вторая. 1889–1903) is the second book of poetry by Zinaida Gippius and comprised 62 of her poems. It was published in 1910 by Musaget (Мусагет) Publishers.

== Critical reception ==
The book garnered good reviews. Ivan Bunin called Gippius' poetry 'electric', noticing the special way the oxymoron were used as an electrifying force in the hermetic non-emotional world. Innokenty Annensky in his summary of the two Collections lauded the author's 'hint and pause' metaphor technique, and the art of "extracting sonorous chords out of silent pianos."

The poet and critic Mikhail Kuzmin greeted the second Collection, noting that it took up exactly where the first one had left off, both presenting "one straight line without ups or downs". Among the book's 'pearls' he mentioned "Wisdom" (Мудрость), "Interruption" (Перебой), "Sonnet's Three Forms" (Три формы сонета), "Malinka", "Little Devil" (Дьяволенокъ) and "Womanly" (Женское). Kuzmin disliked what he saw as "too many abstractions when it comes to expressing the movements of the soul" as well as the author's long-standing and, apparently, Balmont-inspired habit of "forming nouns from all possible kinds of adjectives" which "gives the poems either dryly abstract, or decadent feel."
