= Zinaida Gippius =

Russian poet (1869–1945)

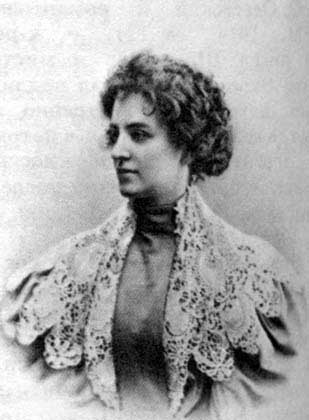
- Gippius in the early 1910s
- Born: Zinaida Nikolayevna Gippius; 20 November [O.S. 8 November] 1869; Belyov, Russia
- Died: 9 September 1945 (aged 75); Paris, France
- Occupations: Poet; novelist; dramatist; literary critic; memoirist
- Spouse: Dmitry Merezhkovsky
- Writing career
- Movement: Symbolism

Zinaida Nikolayevna Gippius (Russian: Зинаида Николаевна Гиппиус, IPA: [zʲɪnɐˈidə nʲɪkɐˈlajɪvnə ˈɡʲipʲɪus]; 20 November [O.S. 8 November] 1869 – 9 September 1945) was a Russian poet, playwright, novelist, editor and religious thinker. She is considered one of the major figures in Russian symbolism.

She began writing at an early age, and by the time she met Dmitry Merezhkovsky in 1888 was already a published poet. The two married in 1889. Gippius published her first book of poetry, Collection of Poems. 1889–1903, in 1903, and her second collection, Collection of Poems. Book 2. 1903–1909, in 1910. After the 1905 Revolution, the couple became critics of the tsarist government; they spent several years abroad during this time, including trips for treatment of health issues. They denounced Russia's 1917 October Revolution, seeing it as a cultural disaster, and in 1919 emigrated to Poland.

After living in Poland they moved to France, and then to Italy, continuing to publish and to take part in Russian émigré circles, though Gippius's harsh literary criticism made enemies. The tragedy of the exiled Russian writer was a major topic for Gippius in emigration, but she also continued to explore mystical and covertly sexual themes, publishing short stories, plays, novels, poetry, and memoirs. The death of Merezhkovsky in 1941 was a major blow to Gippius, who died a few years later in 1945.

== Biography ==
Zinaida Gippius was born on 20 November [O.S. 8 November] 1869, in Belyov, Tula Governorate, the eldest of four sisters. Her father, Nikolai Romanovich Gippius, a respected lawyer and a senior officer in the Russian Senate, was a Russian of German descent. His ancestors, who originally spelled their name Hippius, emigrated to Russia in the 16th century. Her mother, Anastasia Vasilyevna (née Stepanova), was the daughter of the Yekaterinburg chief of police.

Nikolai Gippius's job entailed constant traveling, and because of this his daughters received little formal education. Taking lessons from governesses and visiting tutors, they attended schools sporadically in whatever city the family happened to stay for a significant period of time (Saratov, Tula and Kiev, among others). At the age of 48, Nikolai Gippius died of tuberculosis, and Anastasia Vasilyevna, knowing that all of her girls had inherited a predisposition to the illness that killed him, moved the family southwards, first to Yalta (where Zinaida had medical treatment) then in 1885 to Tiflis, closer to their uncle Alexander Stepanov's home.

By this time, Zinaida had already studied for two years at a girls' school in Kiev (1877—1878) and for a year at the Moscow Fischer Gymnasium. It was only in Borzhomi where her uncle Alexander, a man of considerable means, rented a dacha for her, that she started to get back to normal after the profound shock caused by her beloved father's death.

Zinaida started writing poetry at the age of seven. By the time she met Dmitry Merezhkovsky in 1888, she was already a published poet. "By the year 1880 I was writing verses, being a great believer in 'inspiration', and making it a point never to take my pen away from paper. People around me saw these poems as a sign of my being 'spoiled', but I never tried to conceal them and, of course, I wasn't spoiled at all, what with my religious upbringing," she wrote in 1902 in a letter to Valery Bryusov. A good-looking girl, Zinaida attracted a lot of attention in Borzhomi, but Merezhkovsky, a well-educated introvert, impressed her first and foremost as a perfect kindred spirit. Once he proposed, she accepted him without hesitation, and never came to regret what might have seemed a hasty decision.

Gippius and Merezhkovsky were married on 8 January 1889, in Tiflis. They had a short honeymoon tour involving a stay in the Crimea, then returned to Saint Petersburg and moved into a flat in the Muruzi House, which Merezhkovsky's mother had rented and furnished for them as a wedding gift.

=== Literary career ===
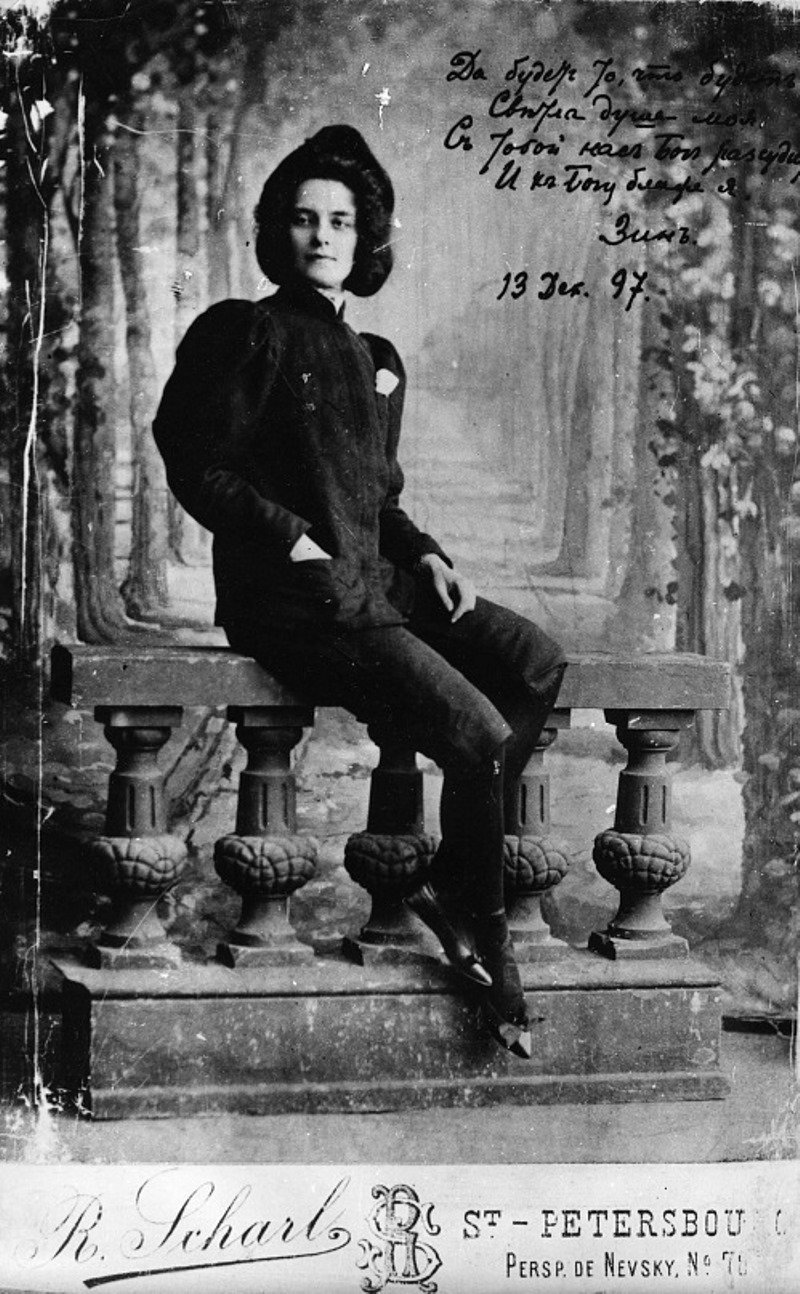
Gippius, 13 December 1897

Merezhkovsky and Gippius made a pact, each promising to concentrate on what he or she did best, the former on poetry, the latter on prose. The agreement collapsed as Zinaida translated Lord Byron's Manfred, and Dimitry started working on his debut novel Julian the Apostate. In Saint Petersburg Gippius joined the Russian Literary Society, became a member of the Shakespearean Circle (the celebrity lawyer Prince Alexander Urusov being its most famous member), and met and befriended Yakov Polonsky, Apollon Maykov, Dmitry Grigorovich, Aleksey Pleshcheyev and Pyotr Veinberg. She became close to the group of authors associated with the renovated Severny Vestnik, where she herself made her major debut as a poet in 1888.

In 1890–91 this magazine published her first short stories, "The Ill-Fated One" and "In Moscow". Then three of her novels, Without the Talisman, The Winner, and Small Waves, appeared in Mir Bozhy. Seeing the writing of mediocre, generic prose as a commercial enterprise, Gippius treated her poetry differently, as something utterly intimate, calling her verses 'personal prayers'. Dealing with the darker side of the human soul and exploring sexual ambiguity and narcissism, many of those 'prayers' were considered blasphemous at the time. Detractors called Gippius a 'demoness', the 'queen of duality', and a 'decadent Madonna'. Enjoying the notoriety, she exploited her androgynous image, used male clothes and pseudonyms, shocked her guests with insults ('to watch their reaction', as she once explained to Nadezhda Teffi), and for a decade remained the Russian symbol of 'sexual liberation', holding high what she in one of her diary entries termed as the 'cross of sensuality'. In 1901 all this transformed into the ideology of the "New Church" of which she was the instigator.

In October 1903, the Collection of Poems. 1889–1903, Gippius's first book of poetry, came out; Innokenty Annensky later called the book the "quintessence of fifteen years of Russian modernism." Valery Bryusov was greatly impressed too, praising the "insurmountable frankness with which she document[ed] the emotional progress of her enslaved soul." Gippius herself never thought much of the social significance of her published poetry. In a foreword to her debut collection she wrote: "It is sad to realize that one had to produce something as useless and meaningless as this book. Not that I think poetry to be useless; on the contrary, I am convinced that it is essential, natural and timeless. There were times when poetry was read everywhere and appreciated by everybody. But those times are gone. A modern reader has no use for a book of poetry any more."

In the early 1900s, the Muruzi House acquired the reputation of being one of the Russian capital's new cultural centers. Guests recognized and admired the hostess's authority and her talent for leadership, even if none of them found her particularly warm or affectionate.

=== The New Church ===
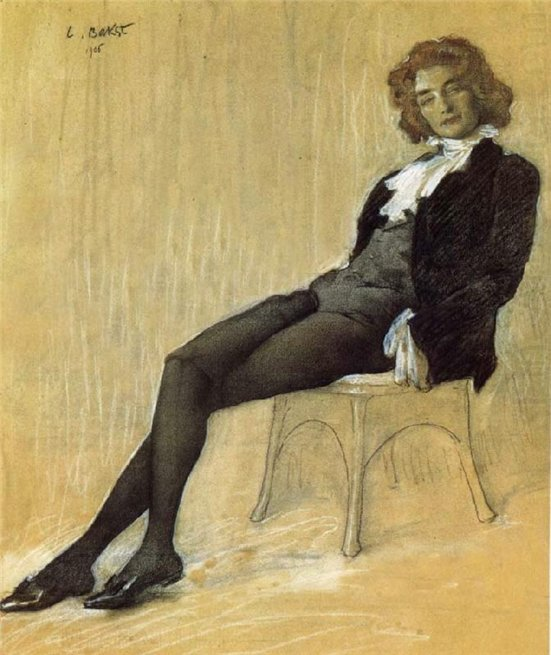
Portrait of Gippius by Léon Bakst, 1906

In 1899–1901, encouraged by the group of authors associated with Mir Iskusstva, the magazine she had become close to, Gippius published critical essays in it using male pseudonyms, Anton Krainy being the best known. Analyzing the roots of the crisis that Russian culture had fallen into, Gippius (somewhat paradoxically, given her 'demonic' reputation) suggested as a remedy the 'Christianization' of it, which in practice meant bringing the intelligentsia and the Church closer together. Merging faith and intellect, according to Gippius, was crucial for the survival of Russia; only religious ideas, she thought, would bring its people enlightenment and liberation, both sexual and spiritual.

In 1901, Gippius and Merezhkovsky co-founded the Religious and Philosophical Meetings. This 'gathering for free discussion', focusing on the synthesis of culture and religion, brought together an eclectic mix of intellectuals and was regarded in retrospect as an important, if short-lived attempt to pull Russia back from the major social upheavals it was headed for. Gippius was the driving force behind the Meetings, as well as the magazine Novy Put (1903–04), launched initially as a vehicle for the former. By the time Novy Put folded (due to a conflict caused by the newcomer Sergei Bulgakov's refusal to publish her essay on Alexander Blok), Gippius (as Anton Krainy) had become a prominent literary critic, contributing mostly to Vesy ('Scales').

After the Meetings were closed in 1903, Gippius tried to revive her initial idea in the form of what was regarded as her 'domestic Church', based on the controversial troyebratstvo ('Brotherhood of Three'), composed of herself, Merezhkovsky, and Dmitry Filosofov, their mutual close friend and, for a short while, her lover. This new development outraged many of their friends, like Nikolai Berdyaev who saw this bizarre parody on the Trinity, with its own set of quasi-religious rituals, as profanation bordering on blasphemy.

=== 1905–1917 ===
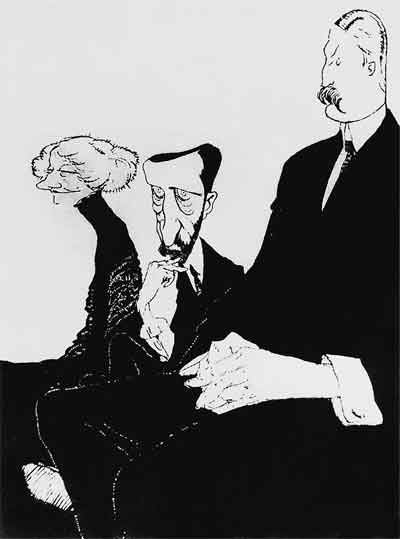
Gippius, Merezhkovsky and Filosofov. Caricature by Re-Mi (Nikolai Remizov)

The 1905 Revolution had a profound impact on Gippius. During the next decade the Merezhkovskys were harsh critics of Tsarism, radical revolutionaries like Boris Savinkov now entering their narrow circle of close friends. In February 1906 the couple left for France to spend more than two years in what they saw as self-imposed exile, trying to introduce Western intellectuals to their 'new religious consciousness'. In 1906 Gippius published the collection of short stories Scarlet Sword (Russian: Алый меч), and in 1908 the play Poppie Blossom (Russian: Маков цвет) came out, with Merezhkovsky and Filosofov credited as co-authors.

Disappointed with the indifference of European cultural elites to their ideas, the trio returned home. Back in Saint Petersburg Gippius's health deteriorated, and for the next six years she (along with her husband, who had heart problems) regularly visited European health resorts and clinics. During one such voyage in 1911 Gippius bought a cheap apartment in Paris, at Rue Colonel Bonnet, 11-bis. What at the time felt like a casual, unnecessary purchase, later saved them from homelessness abroad.

As the political tension in Russia subsided, the Meetings were re-opened as the Religious and Philosophical Society, in 1908. But Russian Church leaders ignored it, and soon the project withered into a mere literary circle. The heated discussion over the Vekhi manifesto led to a clash between the Merezhkovskys and Filosofov on the one hand and Vasily Rozanov on the other; the latter quit and severed ties with his old friends.

By the time her Collection of Poems. Book 2. 1903–1909 came out in 1910, Gippius had become a well-known (though by no means as famous as her husband) European author, translated into German and French. In 1912 her book of short stories Moon Ants (Russian: Лунные муравьи) came out, featuring the best prose she had written in years. The two novels, The Demon Dolls (Russian: Чортовы куклы, 1911) and Roman-Tsarevich (Russian: Роман-царевич, 1912), were meant to be the first and the third book of the Hieromonk Iliodor trilogy, which remained unfinished. The literary left panned them as allegedly 'anti-revolutionary', mainstream critics found these books lackluster, formulaic and tendentious.

At the outbreak of World War I, the Merezhkovskys spoke out against Russia's involvement. Still, Gippius launched a support-the-soldiers campaign of her own, producing a series of frontline-forwarded letters, each combining stylized folk poetic messages with small tobacco-packets, signed with either her own, or one of her three servant maids' names. Some dismissed it as pretentious and meaningless, others applauded what they saw as her reaction to the jingoistic hysteria of the time.

=== 1917–1919 ===
The Merezhkovskys greeted the 1917 February Revolution and denounced the October Revolution, blaming Alexander Kerensky and his provisional government for the catastrophe. In her book of memoirs Dmitry Merezhkovsky. Him and Us, Gippius wrote:

Like mice for whom the world amounts to just themselves and cats, and nobody else, those 'revolutionaries' knew but one sort of distinction: that between the left and the right. Kerensky and his kind intrinsically saw themselves as the 'left', regarding their enemies as 'the right'. As the Revolution happened (not 'made' by them), the left triumphed, but – again, like mice in a basement where there are no more cats, they were still wary of the 'right' as the only source of fear, having in sight just one danger that in 1917 there was none of. They weren't afraid of the Bolsheviks – they belonged to the 'left' too. They never believed the Bolsheviks would be able to keep the power they had taken, and failed to notice how the latter, having stolen their slogans, started to use them with ingenuity, speaking of 'land for peasants', 'peace for everybody', 'the Assembly reinstated', republic, freedom and all that...

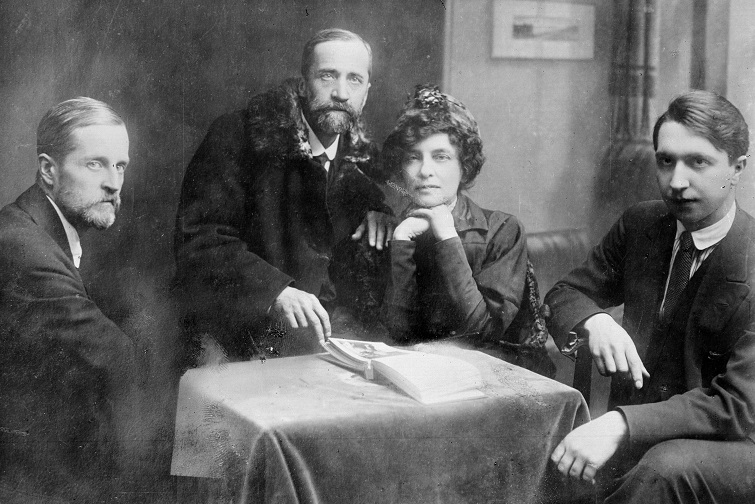
Filosofov (left), Merezhkovsky (center), Gippius, and Zlobin, circa 1919

Gippius saw the October Revolution as the end of Russia and the coming of the Kingdom of Antichrist. "It felt as if some pillow fell on you to strangle... Strangle what — the city? The country? No, something much, much bigger," — she wrote in her 26 October 1917, diary entry. In late 1917 Gippius was still able to publish her anti-Bolshevik verses in what remained of the old newspapers, but the next year was nightmarish, according to her Diaries. Ridiculing H. G. Wells ("I can see why he is so attracted to the Bolsheviks: they’ve leapfrogged him"), she wrote of Cheka atrocities ("In Kiev 1200 officers killed; legs severed, boots taken off." — 23 February. "In Rostov teenager cadets shot down — for being mistakenly taken for Constitutional Democratic Party cadets, the banned ones." — 17 March), of mass hunger and her own growing feeling of dull indifference. "Those who still have a soul in them walk around like corpses: neither protesting, nor suffering, waiting for nothing, bodies and souls slumped into hunger-induced dormancy."

Expressing some sympathy for 'the weeping Lunacharsky' (the only Bolshevik leader to express at least some regret concerning the cruelties of the repressive organs), Gippius wrote: "The things that happen now have nothing to do with Russian history. They will be forgotten, like the atrocities of some savages on a faraway island; will vanish without a trace." Last Poems (1914–1918), published in 1918, presented a stark and gloomy picture of revolutionary Russia as Gippius saw it. After the defeats of Alexander Kolchak in Siberia and Anton Denikin in Southern Russia, respectively, the Merezhkovskys moved to Petrograd. In late 1919, invited to join a group of 'red professors' in Crimea, Gippius chose not to, having heard of massacres orchestrated by local chiefs Béla Kun and Rosalia Zemlyachka. Having obtained permission to leave the city (the pretext being that they would head for the frontlines, with lectures on Ancient Egypt for Red Army fighters), Merezhkovsky and Gippius, as well as her secretary Vladimir Zlobin and Dmitry Filosofov, departed to Poland by train.

=== Gippius in exile ===
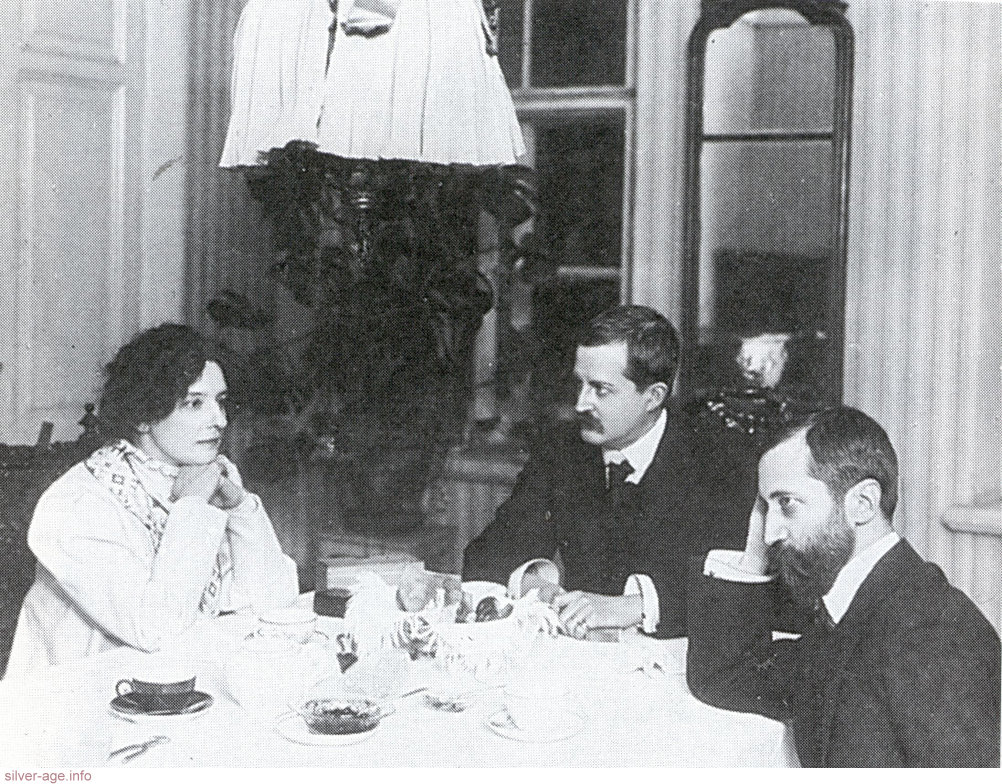
Gippius with Filosofov and Merezhkovsky (right) c. 1920

Their first destination was Minsk where Merezhkovsky and Gippius gave a series of lectures for Russian immigrants and published political pamphlets in the Minsk Courier. During a stay of several months in Warsaw Gippius edited the Svoboda newspaper. Disillusioned with Józef Piłsudski's policies, the Merezhkovskys and Zlobin left for France on 20 October without Filosofov, who chose to stay in the city with Boris Savinkov. The Merezhkovskys's relocation to France was facilitated by Olga and Eugene Petit, who also helped them secure entry and residence permit for their friends such as Ivan Manukhin.

In Paris Gippius concentrated on making appointments, sorting out mail, negotiating contracts and receiving guests. The Merezhkovsky's talks, as Nina Berberova remembered, always revolved around two major themes: Russia and freedom. Backing Merezhkovsky in his anti-Bolshevik crusade, she was deeply pessimistic as regards what her husband referred to as his 'mission'. "Our slavery is so unheard of and our revelations are so outlandish that for a free man it is difficult to understand what we are talking about," she conceded.

The tragedy of the exiled Russian writer became a major topic for Gippius in emigration, but she also continued to explore mystical and covertly sexual themes. She remained a harsh literary critic and, by dismissing many of the well-known writers of the Symbolist and Acmeist camps, made herself an unpopular figure in France.

In the early 1920s, several of Gippius's earlier works were re-issued in the West, including the collection of stories Heavenly Words (Russian: Небесные слова, 1921, Paris) and the Poems. 1911–1912 Diary (1922, Berlin). In Munich, The Kingdom of Antichrist (Russian: Царство Антихриста), authored by Merezhkovsky, Gippius, Filosofov, and Zlobin, came out, including the first two parts of Gippius's Petersburg Diaries (Russian: Петербургские дневники). Gippius was the major force behind the Green Lamp (Russian: Зелёная лампа) society, named after the 19th century group associated with Alexander Pushkin. Factional altercations aside, it proved to be the only cultural center where Russian émigré writers and philosophers (carefully chosen for each meeting and invited personally) could meet and discuss political and cultural topics.

In 1928, the Merezhkovskys took part in the First Congress of Russian writers in exile held in Belgrade. Encouraged by the success of Merezhkovsky's Da Vinci series of lectures and Benito Mussolini's benevolence, in 1933 the couple moved to Italy where they stayed for about three years, visiting Paris only occasionally. With the Socialist movement rising there and anti-Russian emigration feelings spurred by President Paul Doumer's murder in 1932, France felt like a hostile place to them. Living in exile was very hard for Gippius psychologically. As one biographer put it, "her metaphysically grandiose personality, with its spiritual and intellectual overload, was out of place in what she herself saw as a 'soullessly pragmatic' period in European history."

==== The last years ====
As the outbreak of World War II in Europe rendered literature virtually irrelevant, Gippius, against all odds, compiled and published the Literature Tornado, an ambitious literary project set up to provide a safe haven for writers rejected by publishers for ideological reasons. What in other times might have been hailed as a powerful act in support of the freedom of speech, in 1939 passed unnoticed. Merezhkovsky and Gippius spent their last year together in a social vacuum. Regardless of whether or not the 1944 text of Merezhkovsky's allegedly pro-Hitler "Radio speech" was indeed a prefabricated montage (as his biographer Zobnin asserted), there was little doubt that the couple, having become too close to (and financially dependent on) the Germans in Paris, had lost respect and credibility as far as their compatriots were concerned, many of whom expressed outright hatred toward them.

Merezhkovsky died on 7 December 1941 in Paris of a brain hemorrhage. His death came as a heavy blow to Gippius, and she began to contemplate suicide. After the death of her sister Anna on 11 November 1942, she found herself alone in the world. With her secretary Vladimir Zlobin still around, though, Gippius resorted to writing what she hoped would some day gel into the comprehensive life story of her late husband. As Teffi remembered,

Gippius spent the last months of her life working, mostly at nights. Filling one journal after another with that fine calligraphic handwriting of hers, she was preparing a major book that was to become, as she saw it, a proper tribute to her lifetime companion, the one she referred to as 'the Great Man'. She praised this man in terms which were most unusual for her – a woman of icy sharp intellect whose view on people around her was so utterly ironic. She must have loved him very, very strongly.

In March 1944, Gippius began to complain of a feeling of paralysis and in the right side of her body. A physician was called, who diagnosed her with sclerosis; this fact was kept hidden from Gippius. In March of 1945, her condition worsened; by August, she experienced difficulties in speaking. Gippius died on 9 September 1945, at 3:33 PM. Her last written words were: "Low is my price.... And wise is God." She was interred in Sainte-Genevieve-des-Bois Russian Cemetery with her husband. A small group of people attended the ceremony, among them Ivan Bunin.

== Legacy ==
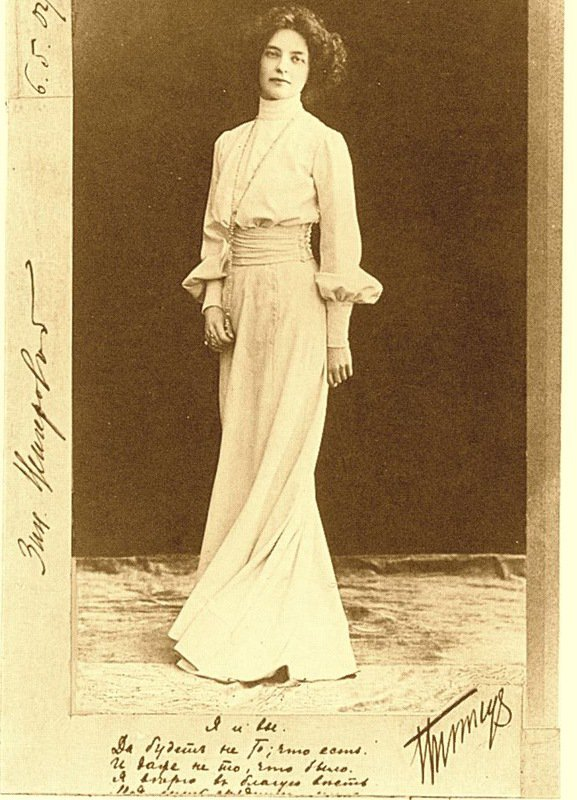
Gippius in the early 1910s

Modern scholars see Gippius's romantically tinged early poems as mostly derivative, Semyon Nadson and Friedrich Nietzsche being the two most obvious influences. The publication of Dmitry Merezhkovsky's symbolist manifesto proved to be a turning point: in a short time Gippius became a major figure of Russian Modernism. Her early symbolist prose carried the strong influence of Dostoyevsky, while one of her later novels, Roman Tzarevich (1912), was said to be influenced again by Nietzsche. Gippius's first two short story collections, New People (1896) and Mirrors (1898), examining "the nature of beauty in all of its manifestations and contradictions," were seen as formulaic. Her Third Book of Short Stories (1902) marked a change of direction and was described as "sickly idiosyncratic" and full of "highbrow mysticism." Parallels have been drawn between Gippius's early 20th century prose and Vladimir Solovyov's Meaning of Love, both authors examining the 'quest for love' as the means for self-fulfillment of the human soul.

It was not prose but poetry that made Gippius a major innovative force. "Gippius the poet holds her own special place in Russian literature; her poems are deeply intellectual, immaculate in form, and genuinely exciting." Critics praised her originality and technical virtuosity, claiming her to be a "true heir to Yevgeny Baratynsky's muse". Critic Simon Karlinsky commented that as a poet, she was equal to the acclaimed poets Marina Tsvetaeva and Anna Akhmatova, but "as a historical phenomenon, she is probably more important than either of them."

Her Collection of Poems. 1889–1903 became an important event in Russian cultural life. Having defined the world of poetry as a three-dimensional structure involving "Love and Eternity meeting in Death", she discovered and explored in it her own brand of ethic and aesthetic minimalism. Symbolist writers were the first to praise her 'hint and pause' metaphor technique, as well as the art of "extracting sonorous chords out of silent pianos," according to Innokenty Annensky, who saw the book as the artistic peak of "Russia's 15 years of modernism" and argued that "not a single man would ever be able to dress abstractions in clothes of such charm [as this woman]." Men admired Gippius's outspokenness too: Gippius commented on her inner conflicts, full of 'demonic temptations' (inevitable for a poet whose mission was 'creating a new, true soul', as she put it), with unusual frankness.

The 1906 collection Scarlet Sword, described as a study in the 'human soul's metaphysics' performed from the neo-Christian standpoint, propagated the idea of God and man as one single being. The author equated 'self-denial' with the sin of betraying God, and detractors suspected blasphemy in this egocentric stance. Sex and death themes, investigated in the obliquely impressionist manner formed the leitmotif of her next book of prose, Black on White (1908). The 20th century also saw the rise of Gippius the playwright (Saintly Blood, 1900, Poppie Blossom, 1908). The most acclaimed of her plays, The Green Ring (1916), futuristic in plotline, if not in form, was successfully produced by Vsevolod Meyerhold for the Alexandrinsky Theatre. Anton Krainy, Gippius's alter ego, was a highly respected and somewhat feared literary critic whose articles regularly appeared in Novy Put, Vesy and Russkaya Mysl. Gippius's critical analysis, according to Brockhaus and Efron, was insightful, but occasionally too harsh and rarely objective.

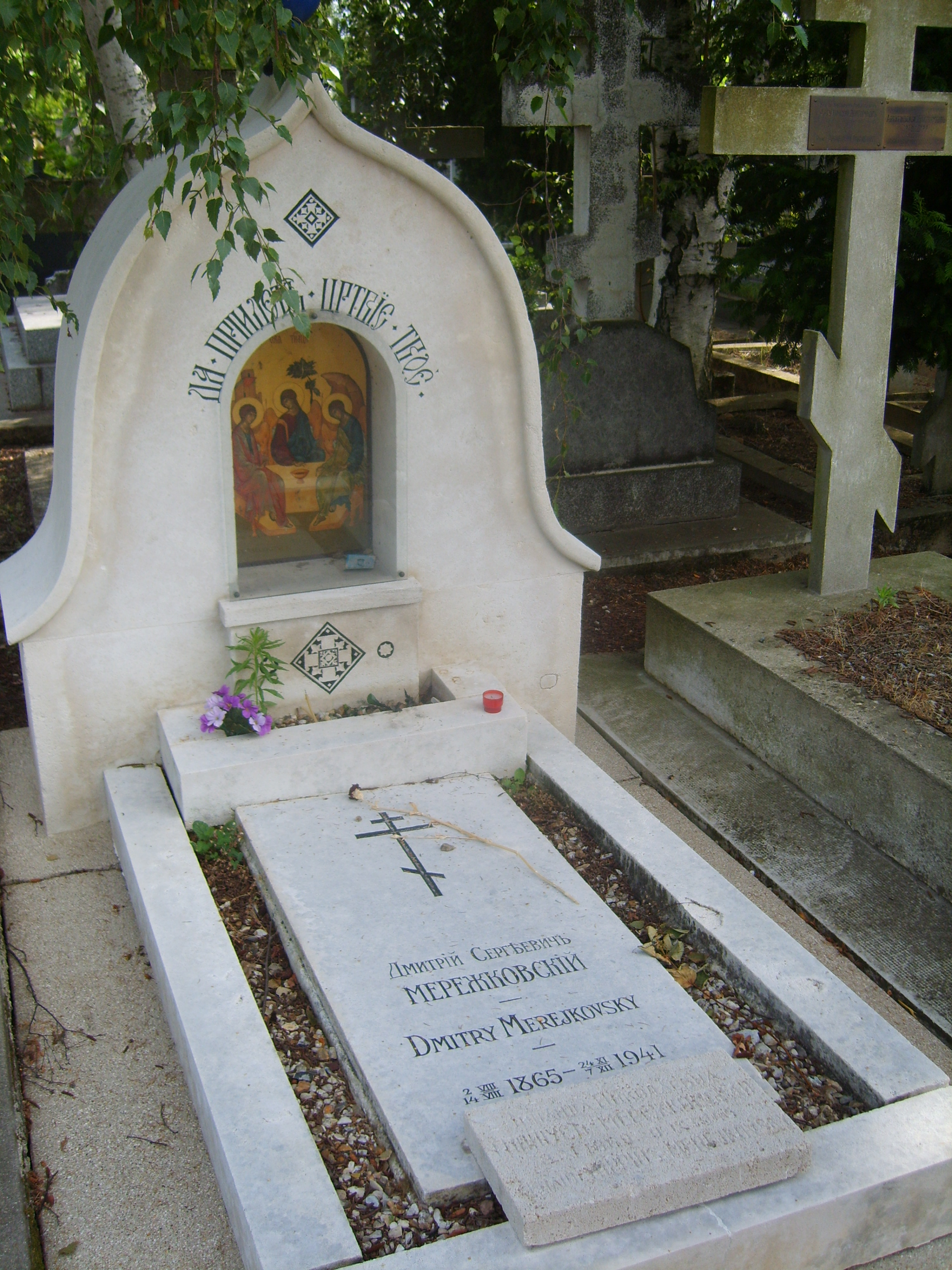
The grave of the Merezhkovskys at the Sainte-Geneviève-des-Bois Russian Cemetery

The 1910 Collection of Poems. Book 2. 1903–1909 garnered good reviews; Bunin called Gippius's poetry 'electric', pointing at the peculiar use of oxymoron as an electrifying force in the author's hermetic, impassive world. Some contemporaries found Gippius's works curiously unfeminine. Vladislav Khodasevich spoke of the conflict between her "poetic soul and non-poetic mind." "Everything is strong and spatial in her verse, there is little room for details. Her lively, sharp thought, dressed in emotional complexity, sort of rushes out of her poems, looking for spiritual wholesomeness and ideal harmony," modern scholar Vitaly Orlov said.

Gippius's novels The Devil's Doll (1911) and Roman Tzarevich (1912), aiming to "lay bare the roots of Russian reactionary ideas," were unsuccessful: critics found them tendentious and artistically inferior. "In poetry Gippius is more original than in prose. Well constructed, full of intriguing ideas, never short of insight, her stories and novellas are always a bit too preposterous, stiff and uninspired, showing little knowledge of real life. Gippius's characters pronounce interesting words and find themselves in interestingly difficult situations but fail to turn into living people in the reader's mind. Serving as embodiments of ideas and concepts, they are genuinely crafted marionettes put into action by the author's hand, not by their own inner motives."

The events of October 1917 led to Gippius severing all ties with most of those who admired her poetry, including Blok, Bryusov and Bely. The history of this schism and the reconstruction of the ideological collisions that made such a catastrophe possible became the subject matter of her memoirs The Living Faces (Russian: Живые лица, 1925). While Blok (the man whom she famously refused her hand in 1918) saw the Revolution as a 'purifying storm', Gippius was appalled by the 'suffocating dourness' of the whole thing, seeing it as one huge monstrosity "leaving one with just one wish: to go blind and deaf." Behind all this, for Gippius, there was a kind of 'monumental madness'; it was all the more important for her to keep a "healthy mind and strong memory," she explained.

After Last Poems (1918) Gippius published two more books of verse, Poems. 1911–1920 Diaries (1922) and The Shining Ones (1938). Her poetry, prose and essays published in emigration were utterly pessimistic; the 'rule of beastliness', the ruins of human culture, and the demise of civilization were her major themes. Most valuable for Gippius were her diaries: she saw these flash points of personal history as essential for helping future generations to restore the true course of events. Yet, as a modern Russian critic has put it, "Gippius's legacy, for all its inner drama and antinomy, its passionate, forceful longing for the unfathomable, has always borne the ray of hope, the fiery, unquenchable belief in a higher truth and the ultimate harmony crowning a person's destiny. As she herself wrote in one of her last poems, "Alas, now they are torn apart: the timelessness and all things human / But time will come and both will intertwine into one shimmering eternity'."

== Selected bibliography ==
=== Poetry ===
- Collection of Poems. 1889–1903 (Собрание стихов. 1889–1903)
- Collection of Poems. Book 2. 1903–1909 (Собрание стихов. Книга 2, 1910)
- The Last Poems (1914–1918)
- Poems. 1911–1912 Diary (1922, Berlin).
- Poems. 1911–1920 Diaries (1922)
- The Shining Ones (1938, poetry collection)

=== Prose ===
- New People (1896, short stories)
- Mirrors (1898, short stories)
- The Third Book of Short Stories (1902)
- Scarlet Sword (1906, short stories)
- Black on White (1908, short stories)
- Moon Ants (1912, short stories)
- The Devil's Doll (1911, novel)
- Roman-Tzarevich (1912, novel)
- Words from the Heavens (1921, Paris, short stories)

=== Drama ===
- Sacred Blood (1900, play)
- Poppie Blossom (1908, play)
- The Green Ring (1916, play)

=== Non-fiction ===
- The Living Faces (1925, memoirs)

== English translations ==
- Mirrors, (novella), translated by Carl L. Engel, King Tide Press, 2026.
- Apple Blossom, (story), from Russian Short Stories, Senate, 1995.
- The Green Ring, (play), C.W. Daniel LTD, London, 1920.
- Poems, Outside of Time: an Old Etude (story), and They are All Alike (story), from A Russian Cultural Revival, University of Tennessee Press, 1981. ISBN 0-87049-296-9
