= The Rising Tide (Deland novel) =

1916 novel by Margaret Deland

- First edition
- Author: Margaret Deland
- Language: English
- Genre: Novel
- Publisher: Harper & Brothers
- Publication date: 1916
- Publication place: USA
- Media type: Print (Hardback)
- Pages: 292
- OCLC: 1001773
- Preceded by: The Iron Woman

The Rising Tide is a novel about issues confronting women in the years just before suffrage by the American writer Margaret Deland (1857–1945) set in the 19th century fictional locale of Mercer, an Ohio River community that represents Pittsburgh, Pennsylvania.

The novel tells the story of Frederica Payton, a "new woman" who illustrates the extremes of the feminist question.

It was first published in installments in Harper's Monthly from December 1915 through October 1916.
