= The Bulwark (novel) =

Novel by Theodore Dreiser

- First edition
- Author: Theodore Dreiser
- Language: English
- Publisher: Doubleday
- Publication date: 1946
- Publication place: United States

The Bulwark is a novel by Theodore Dreiser, published posthumously in 1946.

== Plot summary ==
Hannah and Rufus Barnes, both Quakers, move out of Maine to Trenton, New Jersey, where Hannah's widowed sister lives. Their son Solon, the protagonist, meets Benecia Wallin; although she is affluent and he is not, they get married. Solon works in a bank in Philadelphia, where his Quaker values are contrary to financial ethos. He summons a bank examiner from Washington DC to stop the corrupt practices of some chief executives. Eventually, he resigns.

Meanwhile, two of his offspring, Etta and Stewart, repudiate their Quaker upbringing. While Orville gets married and Isobel works in a college, Etta moves to Wisconsin and then Greenwich Village under the influence of one of her friends, Volida La Porte. She has an affair with a painter, until he decides to go West to further his career. Moreover, Stewart accidentally kills one of his dates and commits suicide shortly after. Eventually, Benecia dies upon Etta's return; Solon dies of cancer as Etta watches over him.

== Allusions to actual history ==
- Quaker figures by George Fox and John Woolman, with his Journals, are mentioned.
- Financiers such as Nicholas Biddle, Anthony Joseph Drexel I, George Dunton Widener, the Vanderbilt family, Jay Gould, J. P. Morgan, and John D. Rockefeller are mentioned.

== Allusions to other works ==
- The Quaker Book of Discipline and the Bible are mentioned.
- Mrs Tennet tells Orville about Fairy Berulyne. Later, Volida lends Etta a copy of The Lady of the Camellias by Alexandre Dumas, fils. Later, Etta also reads La Cousine Bette by Balzac, Madame Bovary by Gustave Flaubert and Alphonse Daudet's Sappho.
- Jack and the Beanstalk, Charles Perrault's Bluebeard, and Sinbad the Sailor are also mentioned.

== Literary significance and criticism ==
- Theodore Dreiser started working on this novel as early as 1914. It was published posthumously, one year after Dreiser's death.
- Dreiser read John Woolman's Journals in 1939. It has been suggested that Dreiser's reading of Thoreau in 1938 influenced some passages.
- The novel has been described as an allegory, where Solon is the figure of a saint. Moreover, it has been suggested that Solon Barnes was informed by Theodore Dreiser's own father, John Paul Dreiser.
