= The Iron Woman (Deland novel) =

1911 novel by Margaret Deland

- First edition
- Author: Margaret Deland
- Language: English
- Genre: Novel
- Publisher: Harper & Brothers
- Publication date: 1911
- Publication place: United States
- Media type: Print (hardback)
- Pages: 477
- OCLC: 271600
- Preceded by: The Awakening of Helena Richie
- Followed by: The Rising Tide

The Iron Woman is a novel of manners by the American writer Margaret Deland, set in the 19th century fictional locale of Mercer, an Ohio River community representing Pittsburgh, Pennsylvania.

The novel tells the story of Mrs. Maitland, a leathery old widow who owns and operates an iron mill. Her devotion to a Puritanical work ethic alienates her son Blair, who though he stands to inherit the business, is headstrong and in love with Elizabeth Ferguson, a match Mrs. Maitland disapproves of.

It was first published in installments in Harper's Monthly from November 1910 through October 1911.

== Plot ==
This is a sequel to The Awakening of Helena Richie and continues the narrative of her life. The story opens when her adopted son David is ten years old and she is living with him in the manufacturing town of Mercer, situated but a short distance from Old Chester. David has three playmates of his own age: Elizabeth Ferguson, a fascinating and passionate child, who lives with her bachelor uncle, and Blair and Nannie Maitland, whose mother is known as the "Iron Woman". Sarah Maitland is a forceful woman. She manages the Maitland Iron Works which she has inherited from her husband, who only survived his marriage to her by a few months, and who died before the birth of Blair. Nannie, the child by a previous marriage, is a gentle and timid girl devoted to her stepbrother. The children grow up and Elizabeth after having a youthful affair with Blair, becomes engaged to David who is studying to be a doctor. A misunderstanding arises between them and Elizabeth, in a burst of wild passion, marries Blair who is so much in love with her that he is willing to be false to his old friend. Mrs. Maitland, whose rough exterior hides an honest and affectionate nature, is overwhelmed by the dishonorable action of her son, whom she has idolized, and at once disinherits him. Blair whose artistic nature has been so shocked and repulsed by his mother's eccentricities that he has no real affection for her, is furious, and severs all connection with her. An explosion occurs at the works, and Sarah Maitland is fatally hurt. Before her death she writes the name of Blair upon a check for a large sum of money which she had planned to give David for building a hospital. She is unable to sign the check and Nannie who is the only one present, anxious that Blair shall have the money, forges her mother's name after her death. Blair is gratified with the bequest and is preparing to invest it when the truth becomes known. Elizabeth, who has always loved David, asks Blair to give him the money and when he declines to do so, leaves him and goes to David. David, who has continued to love Elizabeth passionately, urges her to flee with him, and she is ready to do so when Helena Ritchie appears upon the scene and prevents the action by confessing to them her own experience. Elizabeth returns to Blair. But after futile efforts to win her love he finally agrees to free her and allows her to get a divorce and marry David. Helena, who has been ardently sought in marriage by Robert Ferguson, Elizabeth's uncle, at last gives in and acknowledges her love for him.

== Sources ==
- Deland, Margaret (1911). The Iron Woman. New York: Harper & Brothers.
- Demarest, David P. (1976). From These Hills, From These Valleys: Selected Fiction about Western Pennsylvania. Pittsburgh: University of Pittsburgh Press. ISBN 0-8229-1123-X.
- Keller, H. R. (1924). The Reader's Digest of Books. The Library of the World's Best Literature. New York: The Macmillan Company. pp. 438–9.
- Reep, Diana C. (1985). Margaret Deland. Boston: Twayne Publishers. ISBN 0-8057-7420-3.
