= The Awakening of Helena Richie =

1906 novel by Margaret Deland

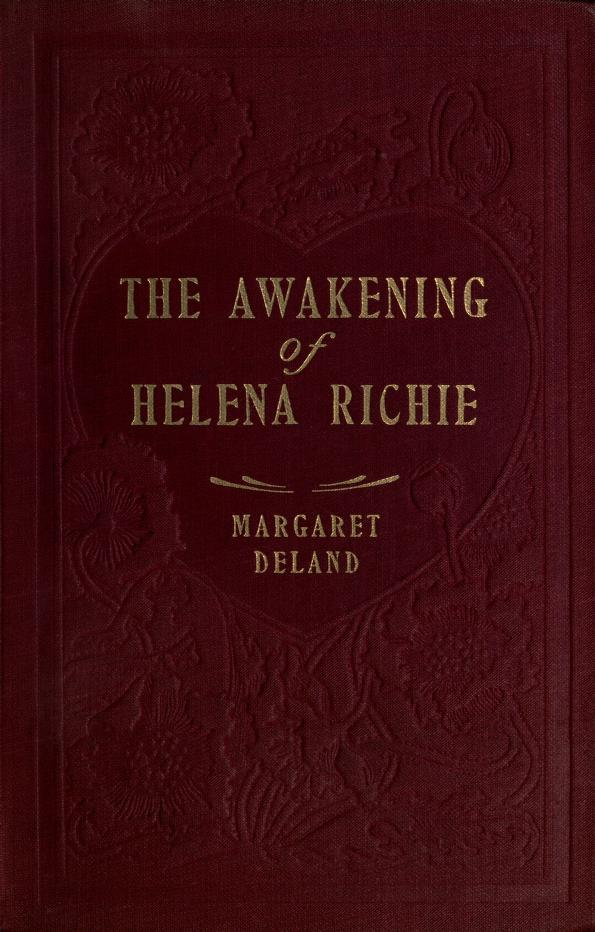
- Author: Margaret Deland
- Language: English
- Genre: Novel
- Publisher: Harper & Brothers
- Publication date: 1906
- Publication place: United States
- Media type: Print (hardback)
- Pages: 356
- OCLC: 756654

The Awakening of Helena Richie is a novel by the American writer Margaret Deland (1857 - 1945) set in the 19th century fictional locale of Old Chester, a Western Pennsylvania rural village just a few miles outside the city of Pittsburgh, then an industrial boomtown. A sequel was published, The Iron Woman.

== Overview ==
Helena Richie leaves a drunken husband, who had killed their child, and goes to Old Chester with her friend Lloyd Pryor. Helena adopts a homeless boy, David, who had been a ward of the town's minister, Dr. Lavendar. Helena's true husband dies, but Lloyd Pryor, now tired of Helena, refuses to marry her. Helena confesses to the minister about her actual relationship with Pryor, and Dr. Lavendar forces her to give up her son. Helena agrees, certain that she is an unfit mother. Helena pleads her case and fights for her maternal rights.

It was first published in installments in Harper's Monthly from January through July 1906.

A 1909 Broadway play starred Margaret Anglin and a 1916 silent film starred Ethel Barrymore.
