= Alexander Izmaylov =

Russian fabulist, poet, novelist, publisher, pedagogue and one-time state official

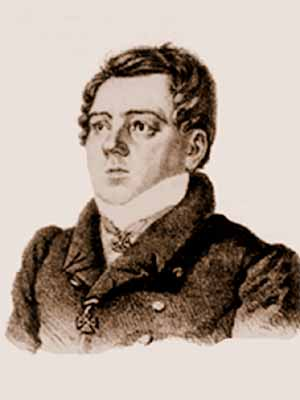
- Born: Александр Ефимович Измайлов; April 25, 1779; Vladimir Governorate, Russian Empire
- Died: January 28, 1831 (aged 51); Saint Petersburg, Russian Empire
- Occupation: fabulist • poet • novelist • publisher

Alexander Efimovich Izmaylov (Алекса′ндр Ефи′мович Изма′йлов; 25 April 1779, in Vladimir Governorate, Russian Empire – 28 January 1831, in Saint Petersburg, Russian Empire) was a Russian fabulist, poet, novelist, publisher (Tsvetnik, Blagonamerenny magazines), pedagogue and one-time state official (a Tver and Arkhangelsk Governorates' vice-governor). Lauded for his satirical fables (by, among others, Vissarion Belinsky), Alexander Izmaylov is considered to be the last major literary figure of the Russian Enlightenment.
