= Punin =

Punin is a surname. It may be a Russian surname with the feminine form Punina. Notable people with the surname include:

- Ignatiy Punin, defrocked bishop of Russian Orthodox Church
- Leonid Punin (1892–1916), Russian partisan of the First World War
- Nikolay Punin, Russian art scholar and writer

== See also ==
- Edy Punina, athlete from Ecuador
- Puning
