= Anna Akhmatova Literary and Memorial Museum =

Museum in Saint Petersburg, Russia

Coordinates: 59.935941°N 30.346591°E

The Anna Akhmatova Literary and Memorial Museum
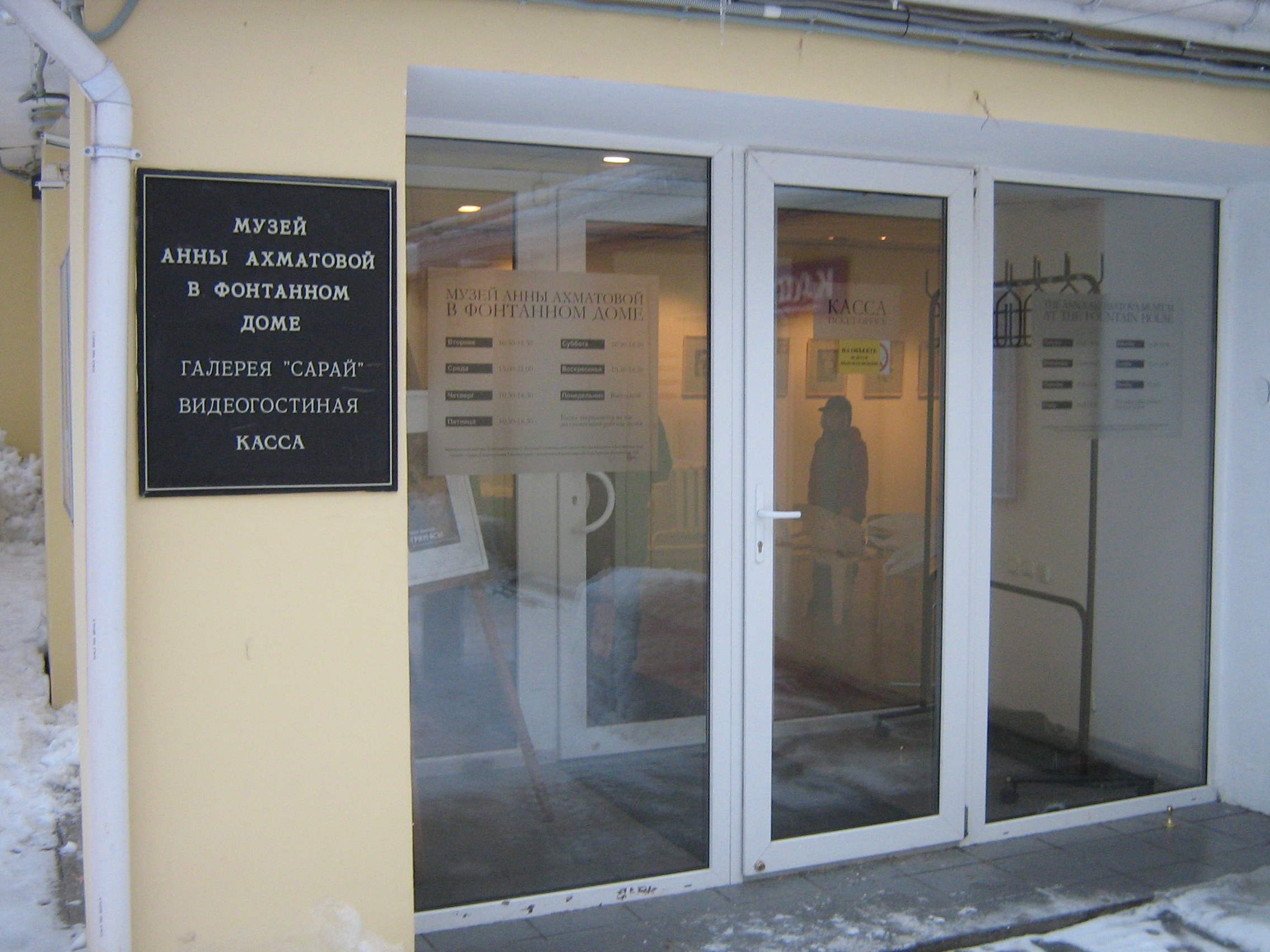
- Established: 1989
- Location: St Petersburg, Russia, wing of Fountain House at 34 Fontanka River Embankment.
- Type: literary museum

The Anna Akhmatova Literary and Memorial Museum is a literary museum in St Petersburg, Russia, dedicated to the poet Anna Akhmatova (1889–1966). It opened in 1989 on the centennial of Akhmatova's birth.

== The palace ==
The museum is located in the South wing (No. 53) of Fountain House at Fontanka River Embankment. The Fountain House was built in the 18th century as a palace for the noble Sheremetev family, while the South wing in the garden was added in 1845, designed by Ieronim Corsini.

From 1935 to 1941, it housed the Museum of Popular Science, which closed immediately upon the German invasion. Anna Akhmatova lived in the northern garden wing of the Fountain House in 1918–1920 with her second husband Vladimir Shileyko, and later in the southern wing with Nikolay Punin (from the mid-1920s until February 1952).

Now the main building is occupied by Saint Petersburg Museum of Music (one of the largest branches of St.Petersburg State Museum of Theatre and Music), and the wing is dedicated to the museum of the poet.

== Museum ==
The Akhmatova Museum was opened in 1989 as a branch of the Dostoevsky Literary and Memorial Museum. In 2003 the exposition was separated into memorial (with restored apartment of Akhmatova and Punin) and literary parts. As of 2009, the museum's collection held about 50,000 items, including autographed editions of Akhmatova's works, photographs, and manuscripts by Akhmatova and her contemporaries.

=== American Office of Joseph Brodsky ===
The museum incorporates an exposition "Американский Кабинет Иосифа Бродского". It is based on things which Maria Sozzani, the widow of Joseph Brodsky, gifted to the museum: furniture, library, postcard collection, etc., from Brodsky's last house in South Hadley, Massachusetts.

== Other museums of Akhmatova ==
In Saint Petersburg, there is museum dedicated to the poet, her circle and her times. It is called "Anna Akhmatova. The Silver Age" and is located on the ground floor of an ordinary apartment building in the vicinity of Avtovo.

In little village Slobidka-Shelekhivska in Khmelnytskyi Oblast, Ukraine, there is a Literary-memorial museum of Anna Akhmatova.
