= Dmitry Shorin =

Russian artist and sculptor (born 1971)

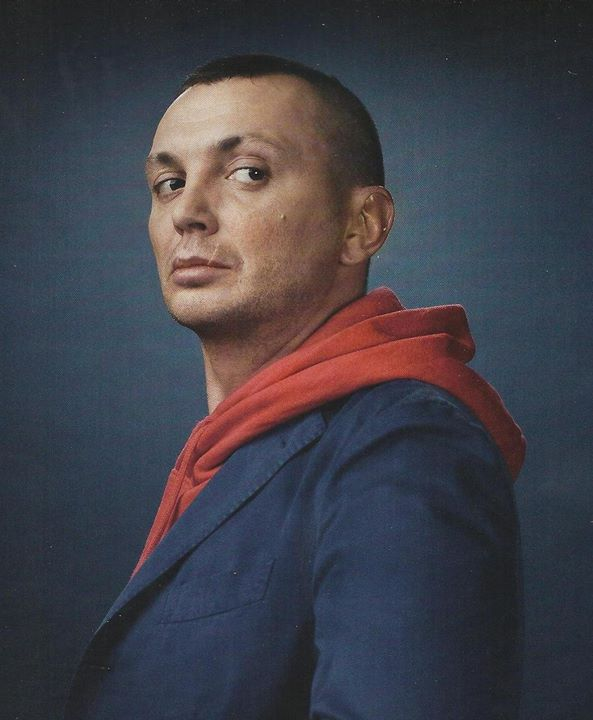
- Photo of Dmitry Shorin originally published in Afisha magazine
- Born: 28 April 1971 (age 55); Novosibirsk, Russian SFSR, Soviet Union
- Education: Omsk State Pedagogical University
- Known for: sculpture, painting
- Notable work: I Believe in Angels
- Website: shorinair.com

Dmitry Alexandrovich Shorin (Russian: Дми́трий Алекса́ндрович Шо́рин; born 28 April 1971 in Novosibirsk, USSR) is an artist and sculptor.

== Biography ==
Shorin studied at the graphic arts department of the Gorky Pedagogical Institute in Omsk (1987–1988) and at the Academy of Public Services in Omsk, specializing in costume design (1988–1990). He continued his education at the Academy of Public Services in St. Petersburg (1990–1992).

In 1993 he joined the Association of Artists “Free Culture” of Art Center “Pushkinskaya, 10”.

Shorin has had over 70 exhibitions in Russia, Europe and America. He participated in the 1st and 3rd Moscow Biennale of Contemporary Art, the 55th Venice Biennale, HangART-7 in Salzburg, and art shows in Kyiv, Madrid, Athens, Vienna, Miami, Paris and London.

His works are on permanent display in the State Russian Museum, the Moscow Museum of Modern Art, and Erarta, and have been presented in numerous museum and personal collections.

His paintings have been auctioned at major international auction houses such as Sotheby's (Sotheby's 2020, Sotheby's 2021) and Phillips de Pury.

In 2008 he held a solo exhibition at the Marble Palace of the State Russian Museum. In 2009 he was nominated for the Kandinsky Prize in the category "Project of the Year". In 2013 his project “I believe in angels” was presented at the 55th Venice Biennale.

In 2013, four glass fiber figures of angels with airplanes' wings from his project "I Believe in Angels" were placed in the departure hall of Terminal 1 of Pulkovo Airport in Saint Petersburg.

His work created in collaboration with a musician Sergei Shnurov was relocated to Pulkovo in 2014.

== Special projects ==
=== “I Believe in Angels” ===
The project evolved from a proposal to create sculptures for Sheremetyevo International Airport. It was supposed to create a monument to Icarus taking off with wings from a real IL-86 on the territory of the terminal. Icarus would represent new power and strength, his non-burning wings would not melt, but would allow him to fly in a cruel atmosphere. As a result, the plot appeared only in the painting “IL-86” in 2010, and the project with the sculptures was changed. The sketch had a Barbie with airplane wings attached from a plane model, where the fuselage was taken in proportion to the body of the barbie.

The perfect body began to point to the angels, and instead of swan wings, they had new, powerful jet engines. Each represents a guardian angel with collective responsibility. A kind of frivolous angels who did not save the passengers of the flight — the wings of each were identical to a certain brand of aircraft with the identification numbers of the board that died in major plane crashes. The project pointed to the human factor in man-made disasters. The angels, being distracted by household chores, did not save the wards entrusted to them.

Then the concept grew into the idea of Belief into The Angels and they turned into guardian angels who have the same wings as airplanes and can follow up a person in the sky.

The project visited Erarta exhibitions in 2013 in London, New York, Zurich and at the 55th Venice Biennale at Palazzo Bembo in Venice.

Four sculptures are located in the Pulkovo airport terminal and two are in the Erarta Museum in St. Petersburg.

=== Airfield ===
“Airfield” is a joint exhibition project of Dmitry Shorin and Sergey Shnurov. The ramp on the runway is a symbol of constant movement, working 24/7 so that people can leave the house, or find it. Airfield is a work about the love of travel, sadness in parting and nostalgia for the old Pulkovo, where the artists spent time before their often flights.

“In the gallery, we imitate a runway with markings. In the painting “Airfield”, the building of Pulkovo Airport, two liners, people go down the ladders. We want to show the real gates of the modern metropolis” – Dmitry Shorin.

We have a picture of two large canvases, on one — day, on the other — night, like yin and yang. We study nature and texture on the spot, in Pulkovo, in order to soak up the atmosphere. You need to catch the suitcase mood, feel like a guest or a resident of our city. In painting, I am most interested in energy. Shorin and I are working, as it were, in the style of “sport meditation”.

— Sergey Shnurov

Now the diptych hangs in the Pulkovo airport terminal.

=== Apology of Delusions ===
A special project was painted picture after picture for exhibition in museums from 2015 to 2018, with non-typical plots and large sizes.

Apology includes 17 paintings from two series “Flowers” (Stargazer, Yak and Poppy, Peony, Lotus, Rose, I am waiting for you at 8 on Mayakovskaya) and “Forest” (Lumen, Scarlet, Pushkin, Pic Nic, Winter, Tanya, Birch Juice, Lambs, Morning in the Forest, April, Apologia of Delusions).

“I wanted to have a dialogue with myself about wandering in the inner aesthetic and psychological territory. Where I find flashes of objects that have not been explored until today. I appealed to a person, and now to a semi-abstract medium and created a non-existent world of illusions, deja vu, mixed with dreams and reality” – Dmitry Shorin.

Paintings visited exhibitions:

- 2018 — “Apology of Delusions”, Fine Art Gallery. Moscow, Russia.
- 2018 — “Scarlet”, A. Kasteyev State Museum of Arts. Alma-Ata, Kazakhstan.
- 2019 — “Swan and Odette” (with Eva Shorina), New Museum. Saint-Petersburg, Russia.
- 2020 –- “Today is the past of Tomorrow”

=== NFT ===
Dmitry started issuing NFTs in 2021. The first series is animated paintings. It includes the works “Banzai”, “Nefertiti”, and “Two Skies”. The first drop on the Foundation platform was included in the NFT sales rating of Russian Artists according to TANR.

The second Over series deals with the digital nature of sculptures and their presence in the metaverse.

“The digital world is a place of reflections and projections, with emotions and receptors twisted to the maximum. NFT is an ephemeral unit. It is pure, unrestricted implementation of the concept, written in digital language. In this series, each work has its own separate concept and reference — real-life sculptures. But their incarnations and reflections are a touch of digitality and a trace from their elevation into a new medium of the meta-universe” – Dmitry Shorin.

=== Series “Heads” ===
The project with objects on the head includes the paintings “Ilyushin”, ”Star”, “On/Off”, “7 o'clock”, “Nefertiti” 2014 and “Nefertiti” 2021, as well as sculptures “Yuna” and “Tima”. A series with children's heads and technological structures is an allegory about analog thinking It tell us about children who began to re-penetrate the physics of things and the essence of things in their analog structure. On their heads are cylinders of a star-shaped aircraft engine, and their minds are directed deep into phenomena, despite global computerization. At the moment, the sculptures "Yuna" and "Tima" are located at the Riga airport.

=== Series “Beach” ===
The “Beach” series includes the films “Tomorrow is the Last Day”, “May Be”, “Flight from Moscow”, “Departure before 12”, “La Plage” and “Courchevel”. Shorin wrote of the series:

== Chronology of exhibitions ==
=== Museum exhibitions ===
- 2021 — “The Next Day” / “A Következő Napon”, CCA im. S. Kuryokhin (Saint-Petersburg, Russia), Miskolci Galéria (Miskolc, Hungary)

Afisha, ArtMoscow, Yarcenter, ArtTube. Gallerix, Myseldon, Nevnov, Artvesti, Design-mate, Above Art, Colta, Bezformata, Sobaka.

- 2020 — “Today is the past Tomorrow”, State Museum of Fine Arts of the Republic of Tatarstan, Russia

Museum, Realnoevremya, Forsmi, Tatar-inform, Ramler, ArtTube.

- 2019 — “Swan and Odette” (with Eva Shorina), New Museum. Saint-Petersburg, Russia

New Museum, ArtTube.

- 2019 — “Plastic Mass”, Marble Palace. Saint-Petersburg, Russia

Russian Museum, Museum news, Admagazine, Kulturomania, Spbvedomosti, Sobaka, Peterburg Center.

- 2018 — “Apology of Delusions”, Moscow Museum of Modern Art, Fine Art Gallery. Moscow, Russia

MMoMA, Gallery Fine Art, Iz, Independent, RenTv, M24, Museum news, ArtTube.

- 2018 — “Scarlet”, A. Kasteyev State Museum of Arts. Alma-Ata, Kazakhstan

Museum news, Rusevr.asia, City Style Life, Evrazia-Ural, Sxodim.

- 2015 — “Analogue of the Deity”, Erarta. Saint-Petersburg, Russia

Erarta, Kudago.

- 2014 — “Ready to fly?”, Moscow Museum of Modern Art. Moscow, Russia
- 2013 —“I believe in Angels”, Erarta Gallery. London, UK
- 2013 — “I believe in Angels”, Erarta Gallery. New York, USA
- 2013 — “I believe in Angels’, Erarta Gallery. Zurich, Switzerland
- 2013 — “Born to fly and… to crawl”, Benois Wing of the State Russian Museum. Saint-Petersburg, Russia
- 2012 — “We are (not) alone”, Erarta. Saint Petersburg, Russia
- 2012 — Tsaritsyno Museum-Reserve. Moscow, Russia
- 2011 — “Holidays”, Moscow Museum of Modern Art. Moscow, Russia
- 2011 — “Windows and doors”, State Russian Museum. Saint-Petersburg, Russia
- 2009 — “Self-portrait”, Moscow Museum of Modern Art. Moscow, Russia
- 2008 — Selection Art Moscow 2008. Modern Perspectives, Muravyov-Apostol Estate. Moscow, Russia
- 2001 — Museum of Nonconformism, Art Center Pushkinskaya 10. Saint-Petersburg, Russia

=== Biennale ===
- 2019 — Florence Biennale, dedicated to the 500th anniversary of the death of Leonardo da Vinci. Florence, Italy
- 2013 — 55th Venice Biennale, Palazzo Bembo. Venice, Italy
- 2009 — “Desktop: War and Peace”. Exhibition within the parallel program of the III Moscow Biennale of Contemporary Art, Fine Art Gallery. Moscow, Russia
- 2005 —“Girls' Best Friends”, Exhibition within the framework of the parallel program of the 1st Moscow Biennale of Contemporary Art, Fine Art Gallery. Moscow, Russia
- 2004 — ArtKlyazma, Moscow region, Russia
- 2003 — ArtKlyazma, Moscow region, Russia
- 1996 — Exhibition in defense of the Art Center Pushkinskaya 10 as part of the IV Biennale of St. Petersburg, Anna Akhmatova Literary and Memorial Museum, Fountain House (Saint Petersburg). Saint-Petersburg, Russia

=== Personal exhibitions ===
- 2020 — “Air”, Space U. Moscow, Russia

Artist's website

- 2020 — “Today is the past Tomorrow”, State Museum of Fine Arts of the Republic of Tatarstan. Kazan, Russia

Exhibition, Museum, Realnoevremya, Forsmi, Afisha, Tatar-inform,Rambler, ArtTube.

- 2019 — “Swan and Odette” (with Eva Shorina), New Museum. Saint-Petersburg, Russia

New Museum, ArtTube.

- 2019 — “Forest Stories”, Ural Vision Gallery. Yekaterinburg, Russia

Ural Vision Gallery, ArtTube, Globalcity, Afisha.

- 2018 — “Scarlet”, A. Kasteyev State Museum of Arts. Alma-Ata, Kazakhstan

Museum news, Arhiv, Rusevr.asia, City Style Life, Evrazia-Ural, Sxodim.

- 2018 — “Under the Eternal Sky”, Ural Vision Gallery. Budapest, Hungary

Ural Vision Gallery

- 2018 — “Apology of Delusions”, Fine Art Gallery. Moscow, Russia

Winzavod, ArtGuide.

- 2015 — “2 I’s”, Fine Art Gallery. Moscow, Russia

Gallery Fine Art

- 2015 — “Analogue of the Deity”, Erarta. Saint-Petersburg, Russia

Erarta, KudaGo.

- 2014 — “Over” (with Vladimir Korolyuk), Savina Gallery. St. Petersburg, Russia
- 2014 — “Swan fidelity”, Fine Art Gallery. Moscow, Russia
- 2013 — “Personal Space”, Fine Art Gallery. Moscow, Russia
- 2013 — “I believe in Angels”, Erarta Gallery. London, UK
- 2013 — “I believe in Angels”, Erarta Gallery. New York, USA
- 2013 — “I believe in Angels”, Erarta Gallery. Zurich, Switzerland
- 2012 — “We are (not) alone”, Erarta. Saint Petersburg, Russia
- 2011 — “Flowers and Planes”, Fine Art Gallery. Moscow, Russia
- 2011 — Zurab Tsereteli’s Art Gallery. Moscow, Russia
- 2011 — “Holidays”, Moscow Museum of Modern Art. Moscow, Russia
- 2010 — “Joys of Life”, Fine Art Gallery. Moscow
- 2010 — “Airfield” (with Sergei Shnurov), AL Gallery. Saint-Petersburg, Russia
- 2009 — “La rose des vents”, Galerie Stanislas Bourgain. Paris, France[34]
- 2009 — “Bird’s Market” (with Dmitry Provotorov), AL Gallery. Saint-Petersburg, Russia
- 2009 — “Desktop: War and Peace”. Exhibition within the parallel program of the III Moscow Biennale of Contemporary Art, Fine Art Gallery. Moscow, Russia
- 2008 — “Dmitry Shorin in the Russian Museum”, Marble Palace of the State Russian Museum. St. Petersburg, Russia
- 2008 — “Wind”, Fine Art Gallery. Moscow, Russia
- 2007 — “Games that people play” (with Dmitry Provotorov), RuArts Gallery. Moscow, Russia
- 2007 — “Body Parts”, Fine Art Gallery. Moscow, Russia
- 2006 — “Once Not Forever”, Fine Art Gallery. Moscow, Russia
- 2005 — “Aeroclub”, Fine Art Gallery. Moscow, Russia
- 2005 — “Mannequins” (with Dmitry Provotorov), Fine Art Gallery. Moscow, Russia
- 2005 — “Girls' Best Friends”, Exhibition within the parallel program of the 1st Moscow Biennale of Contemporary Art, Fine Art Gallery. Moscow, Russia
- 2004 — “Appetite”, Fine Art Gallery. Moscow, Russia
- 2004 -— “Exhibition of one portrait”, Roman Abramovich, Fine Art Gallery. Moscow, Russia
- 2003 — “Girls from Next Door”, Fine Art Gallery. Moscow, Russia
- 2003 — Borey Gallery. Saint Petersburg, Russia
- 2003 — Cultural center “Dom”. Moscow, Russia
- 2003 — “Birds”, Fine Art Gallery. Moscow, Russia
- 2001 — “Disasters”, Museum of Nonconformism, Art Center Pushkinskaya 10. Saint-Petersburg, Russia
- 2000 — Borey Gallery. Saint-Petersburg, Russia
- 1998 — “46 cm3 of blue”, Borey Art Creative Center. Saint-Petersburg, Russia
- 1996 — Gallery 21, Art Center Pushkinskaya 10. Moscow, Russia

=== Group exhibitions ===
- 2021 — “The Next Day” / “A Következő Napon”, CCA im. S. Kuryokhin. Saint-Petersburg, Russia

Afisha, ArtMoscow, Yarcenter, ArtTube, Gallerix, Myseldon, Nevnov, Artvesti, Design-mate, Above Art, Colta , Bezformata, Sobaka.

- 2021 — “The Next Day” / “A Következő Napon”, Miskolci Galéria. Miskolc, Hungary
- 2021 — “Resorts”, Vera Pogodina Gallery. Moscow, Russia

Pogodina Gallery

- 2021 — “Open letter. In memory of Irina Filatova”, Fine Art Gallery. Moscow, Russia

Gallery Fine Art, Afisha, ArtTube, Cabinerdelart.

- 2021 — “Space is ours!”. Gallery ARTSTORY. Moscow, Russia

Art Story, Afisha, Museum news, The Village, The City, Osd.

- 2021 — “Death of the Lilac”, Fine Art Gallery. Moscow, Russia

Gallery Fine Art, Winzavod, Museum news, Afisha, Interior, Vashdosug, Cultradio, Yandex Zen.

- 2020 — Pasca Art Projects “The Line”, Pasca Municipal Art Center. Hungary.
- 2020 — Project “2020 - 2070”, RUSNANO Group and Frida Project Foundation, NUST MISIS. Moscow, Russia

Nanoart, Fiop, A-a-ah!.

- 2019 — "Andy Warhol and Russian Art", Artsolus Foundation, Sevkabel. Saint-Petersburg, Russia

Forbes, The Art Newspaper, Daily Afisha, Colta, KudaGo, Interior, Paperpaper, Afisha, Republic, Fontanka, Meduza, GQ, MK, Sobaka.

- 2019 — Florence Biennale, dedicated to the 500th anniversary of the death of Leonardo da Vinci. Florence, Italy

Florence Biennale

- 2019 — “Not Shakespeare. A dream in a summer night”, Fine Art Gallery. Moscow, Russia

Gallery Fine Art, Eksperiment, Afisha, Above Art.

- 2019 — “Plastic Mass”, Russian Museum, Marble Palace. Saint-Petersburg, Russia

Russian Museum, Museum news, Admagazine, Kulturomania, Spbvedomosti, Sobaka, Peterburg Center.

- 2018 — “Apology of Delusions”, Moscow Museum of Modern Art, Fine Art Gallery. Moscow, Russia

MMoMA, Gallery Fine Art, Iz, Independent, RenTv, M24, Museum news, ArtTube.

- 2017 — “The Extraordinary Adventures of Karik and Vali”, New Museum. Saint-Petersburg, Russia

New Museum, ArtGuide.

- 2017 — “Fine Art Gallery — 25 years in art”, Fine Art Gallery. Moscow, Russia

Gallery Fine Art

- 2016 — “Waiting…”, Fine Art Gallery. Moscow, Russia

Gallerix, Gallery Fine Art.

- 2014 — “Ready to fly?”, Moscow Museum of Modern Art. Moscow, Russia
- 2014 — Erarta Gallery. London, UK
- 2013 — Forum of Public and Street Art graFFFest, Bolshaya Konyushennaya street, 10. St. Petersburg, Russia
- 2013 — 55th Venice Biennale, Palazzo Bembo. Venice, Italy
- 2013 — “Born to fly and… to crawl”, Benois Wing of the State Russian Museum. Saint-Petersburg, Russia
- 2012 — Tsaritsyno Museum-Reserve. Moscow, Russia
- 2012 — “20 years of the Fine Art Gallery”, Exhibition Halls of the Russian Academy of Arts. Moscow, Russia
- 2011 — “Windows and doors”, State Russian Museum. Saint-Petersburg, Russia
- 2010 — “Artistes russes Un art au superlatif”, San Andreas Abbey Center for Contemporary Art. Memak, France
- 2010 — “Resume 2009-2010”, AL Gallery. Saint-Petersburg, Russia
- 2009 — “Self-portrait”, Moscow Museum of Modern Art. Moscow, Russia
- 2009 — Exhibition of nominees for the Kandinsky Prize. Moscow, Russia
- 2008 — Selection Art Moscow 2008. Modern Perspectives, Muravyov-Apostol Estate. Moscow, Russia
- 2008 — Festival “Art-Perm”. Perm, Russia
- 2007 — Gallery of Contemporary Art MART. Saint Petersburg, Russia
- 2006 — “HangART-7”, Salzburg, Austria
- 2006 — “Summer Holidays — Hot Summer”, Fine Art Gallery. Moscow, Russia
- 2004 — ArtKlyazma. Moscow region, Russia
- 2004 — “Super Woman”, Fine Art Gallery. Moscow, Russia
- 2003 — ArtKlyazma. Moscow region, Russia
- 2002 — Center for Contemporary Art. Kyiv, Ukraine
- 2000 — Borey Gallery. Saint-Petersburg, Russia
- 1998 — Borey Gallery. Saint-Petersburg, Russia
- 1997 — “History of Advertising”, Big Exhibition Hall of the Union of Artists of Russia. Saint-Petersburg, Russia
- 1996 — Exhibition in defense of the Art Center Pushkinskaya 10 (as part of the IV Biennale of St. Petersburg), Anna Akhmatova Literary and Memorial Museum, Fountain House (Saint Petersburg). Saint-Petersburg, Russia
- 1995 — Exhibition of private collections, Saint Petersburg Manege. Saint-Petersburg, Russia
- 1995 — Art Center Pushkinskaya 10. Saint-Petersburg, Russia
- 1994 — International Festival of Performance, Saint Petersburg Manege. Saint-Petersburg, Russia
- 1994 — “Best Pictures”, Gallery 103, Gallery 21, Art Center Pushkinskaya 10. Saint-Petersburg, Russia

== Links ==
Artist's website

== Books ==
- “Apology of delusions”, catalog of the exhibition “Apology of delusions” in Moscow Museum of Modern Art, together with Fine Art Gallery, 2018, Moscow, Russia

Exhibitions

- “Today is the past of Tomorrow” exhibition catalog “Today is the past of Tomorrow”, Museum of Fine Arts of Tatarstan, 2020, Kazan, Russia MMoMA
- “Dmitry Shorin”, catalog of the exhibition “Dmitry Shorin in the Russian Museum”, 2010, State Russian Museum, St. Petersburg, Russia

== Gallery ==
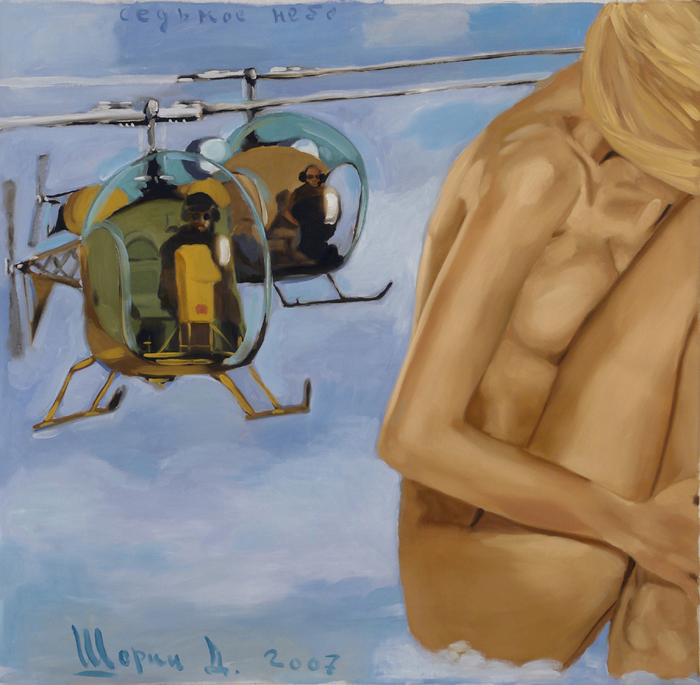
Seventh Heaven, 2007

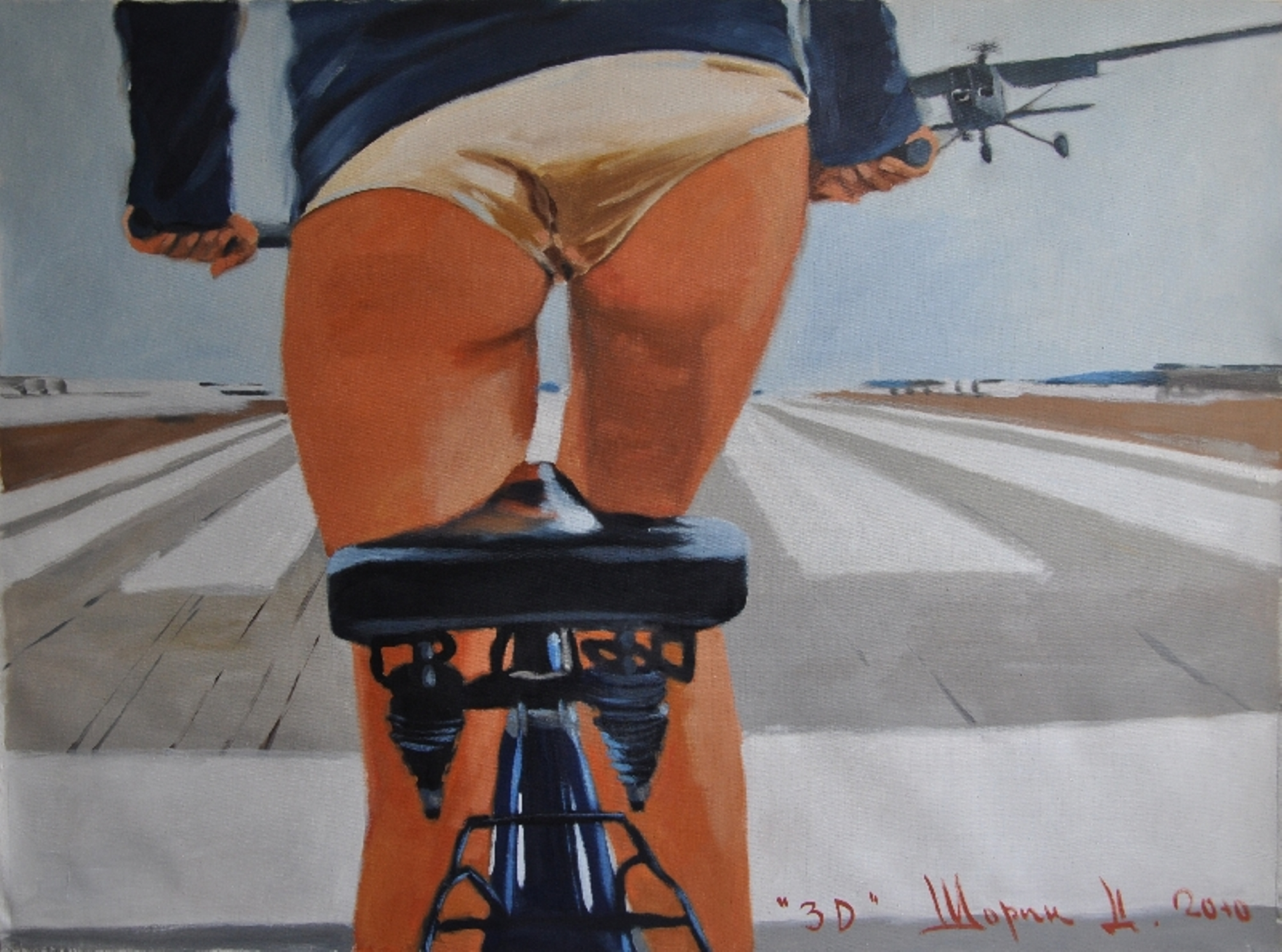
3D, 2010

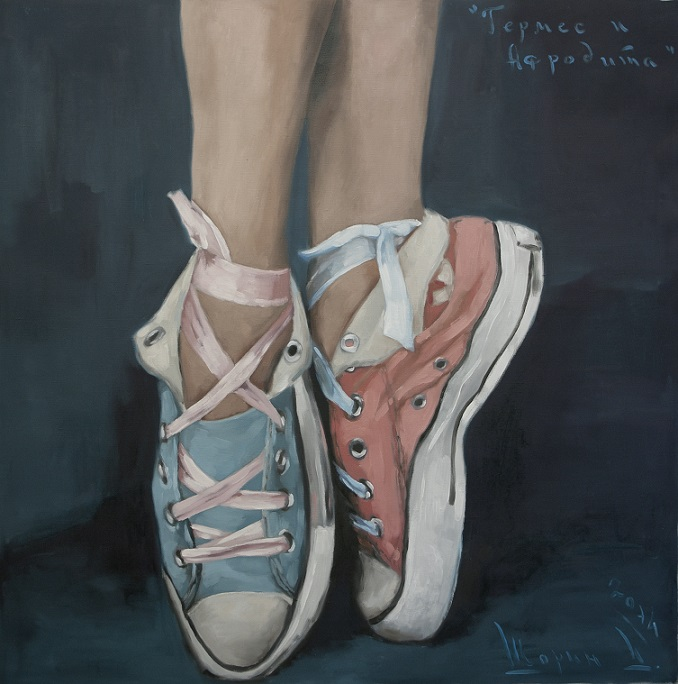
Hermes and Aphrodite, 2014
