= Dmitry Kardovsky =

Russian painter

- Дмитрий Николаевич Кардовский
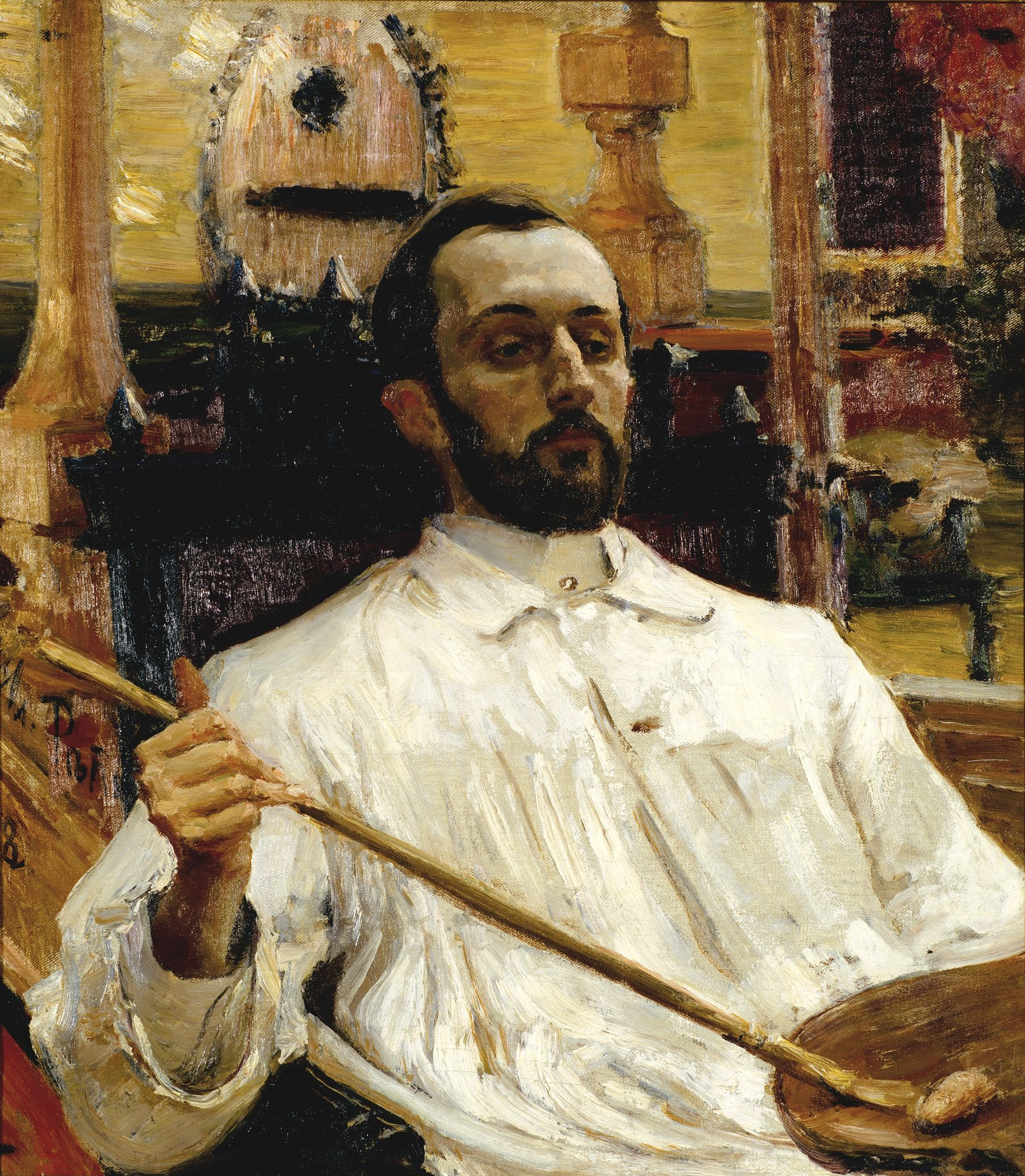
- Ilya Repin, Dmitry Kardovsky, c. 1896–1897, oil on canvas; Tretyakov Gallery
- Born: 5 September 1866; Osurovo, Yaroslavl Governorate, Russian Empire
- Died: 9 February 1943 (aged 76); Pereslavl-Zalessky, RSFSR
- Resting place: Goritsky Monastery, Pereslavl-Zalessky
- Education: Pavel Chistyakov; Ilya Repin; Anton Ažbe
- Spouse: Olga Della-Vos (m. 1899)

Dmitry Nikolayevich Kardovsky (Russian: Дми́трий Никола́евич Кардо́вский; 5 September 1866 – 9 February 1943) was a Russian draughtsman and painter during the Modernist period, particularly known for his illustrations and stage designs.

== Biography ==
He was born near Pereslavl-Zalessky in the Yaroslavl province. After studying law at Moscow University, he then studied at the Imperial Academy of Arts in St Petersburg from 1892, under Pavel Chistyakov and Ilya Repin. Kardovsky moved to Munich in 1896 with Igor Grabar and studied at the private studio of Anton Ažbe. He returned to St. Petersburg in 1900 and received his diploma from the academy in 1902. He was appointed as professor of the academy in 1907.

Kardovsky explored various styles, including Impressionism and Jugendstil, but was more concerned with faithful representation than formal experiment. From 1902, he was prolific as a book illustrator, and worked mainly on the Russian literary classics by Chekhov, Gogol, Lermontov and Tolstoy. He also dabbled with political caricature, providing illustrations for the radical journals Zhupel (Bugbear) and Adskaya Pochta from 1905 to 1906.

In 1934 Isaak Brodsky, a disciple of Ilya Repin was appointed director of the National Academy of Arts and the Leningrad Institute of Painting, Sculpture and Architecture. Brodsky invited Kardovsky among the most distinguished painters and pedagogues to teach at the academy. The system of master's workshops was restored at the Department of Painting. Students were assigned to one of the workshops after they completed their second-year courses. Professor Kardovsky had their own workshops. He also taught at the Moscow School of Painting, Sculpture and Architecture, where one of his students was Grigor Vahramian Gasparbeg.

He was an admirer of Mikhail Vrubel, whose posthumous exhibition he organized in 1912. Kardovsky died in Pereslavl-Zalessky in 1943.

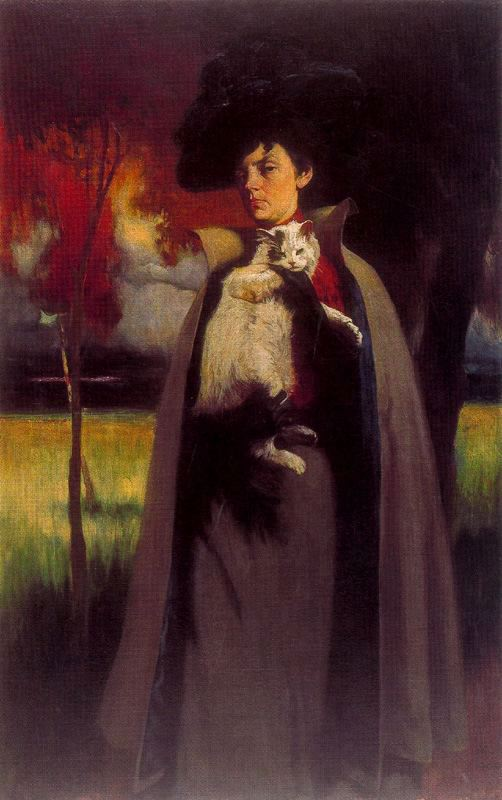
Lady with a Cat, the so-called Marya Anastasievna Chroustchova, 1900; Solomon R. Guggenheim Museum

== Family ==
Dmitry was married to fellow painter, Olga Della-Vos, from April 1899. They had one daughter together, Yekaterina (1900–1985).

== Students at the St Petersburg Academy of Arts ==
- The Latvian-born painter Frédéric Fiebig trained under his guidance in 1906.
- The Socialist Realist artist Serafima Ryangina trained under Kardovsky between 1912–18 and 1921–23.
