= Anna Akhmatova. The Silver Age =

Museum in Saint Petersburg, Russia

- Анна Ахматова. Серебряный Век
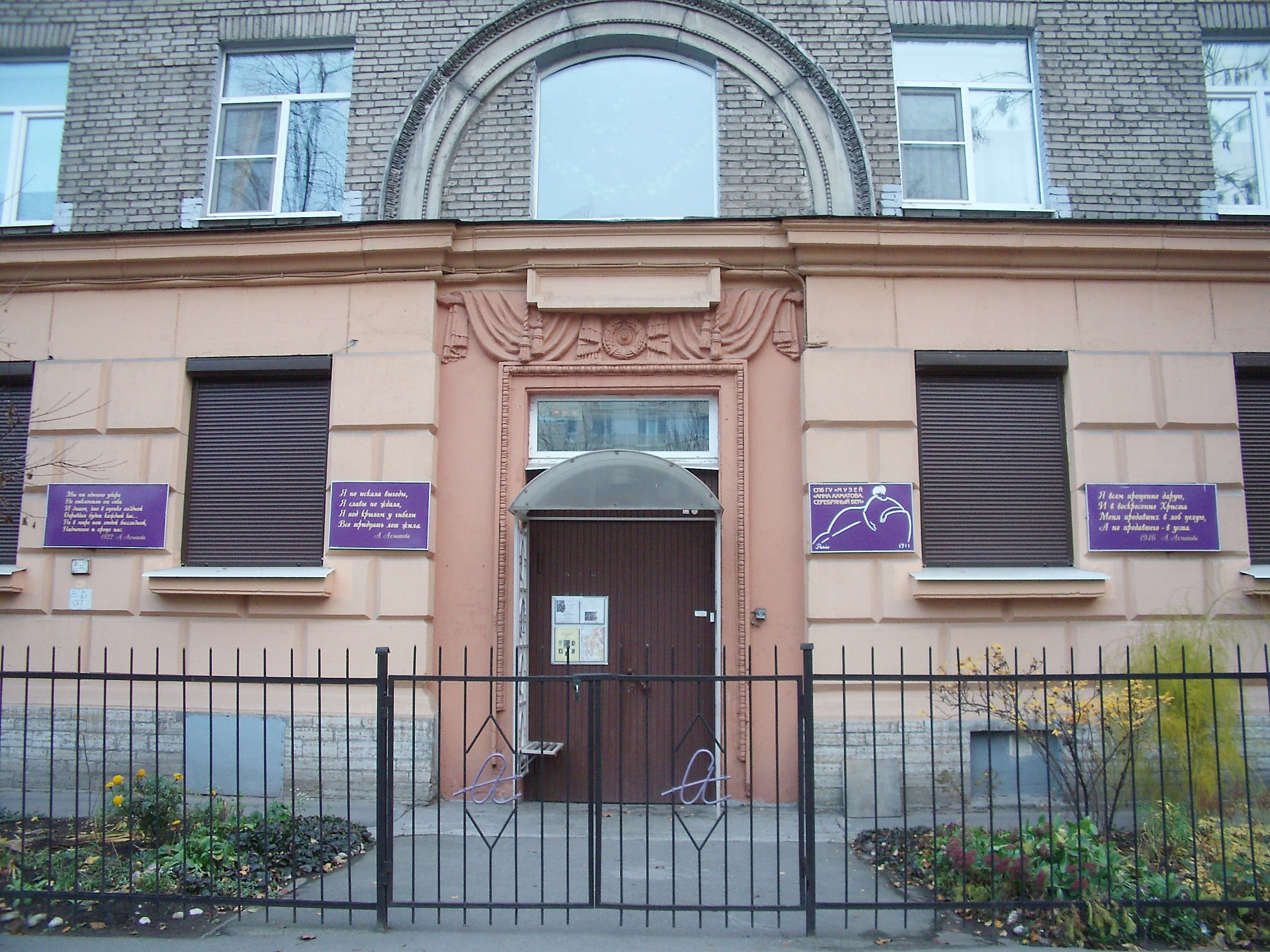
- Established: 1988
- Location: Avtovskaia street, 14 (near the Avtovo metro station), a south-western area of Saint Petersburg, Russia
- Type: Municipal museum
- Director: Svetlana Pshenichnaya
- Website: akhmatova-museum.ru

Anna Akhmatova. The Silver Age (Rus. "Анна Ахматова. Серебряный Век") is a municipal museum in Avtovo (near the eponymous Avtovo metro station), a south-western area of Saint Petersburg, Russia, dedicated to life and work of Anna Akhmatova and other major Russian poets and literary figures of the first half of the 20th century whose writing started during the Silver Age of Russian culture.

It is located on the ground floor of an ordinary apartment building. The museum operates a children's and youth patriotic center, organize quizzes and tournaments, conducts lectures and master-classes for visitors.

== Gallery ==
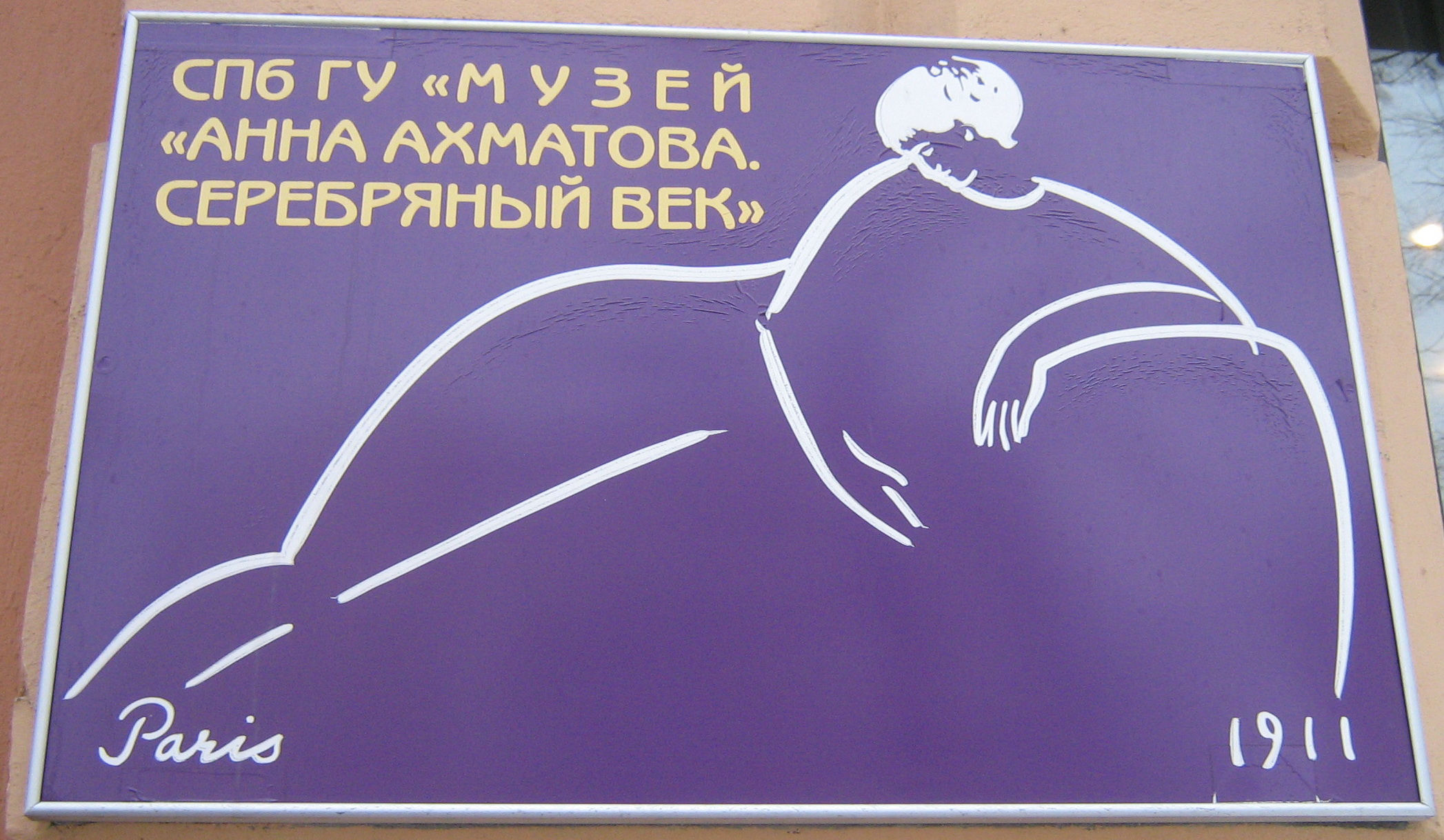
Museum's Plaque
