= Nikola Toshkovich =

Nikola Stefanovich Toshkovich (Bulgarian: Никола Стефанович Тошкович) was born in Odessa, Tsardom of Russia, son of a tradesman. He was the first to use elastic rings on pistons to tighten the fit. This was a key development that later led to the invention of the internal combustion engine.

== Biography ==
Nikola was born in Odessa in the family of Stefan Toshkovich, a Bulgarian tradesman from Kalofer (Ottoman Empire). He had three other brothers and one sister Marya, her daughter was the painter Olga Della-Vos-Kardovskaya.

Nikola Toshkovich studied at the Technological Institute in Saint Petersburg's Technical University. He later moved to Odessa, Russia. He was a member of the Agricultural Association in South Russia and worked in the field of steam engines. For some years he practiced his skills in a factory of a French constructor in Paris, where one of the most modern locomotives was built.

A common problem with steam engines in the middle of 19th century was wear on the surface of the pistons. Friction increases the wear, which causes an increase in the clearance between the piston and the cylinder. This results in an increase in steam consumption and a decrease in power. On 4 March 1857 Nikola Toshkovich presented his invention: the use of elastic rings, located in channels on the surface of the piston, to maintain the fit between the cylinder and the piston. Wear of the cylinder and the rings is compensated for by the elastic expansion of the rings. Toshkovich was issued a patent, the first known patent to be issued to a Bulgarian inventor.

The pistons Toshkovich created were three times cheaper than all previous pistons; they improved fuel economy by 16-18%; and they were robust and long-lasting. This invention has made possible the later invention of the internal combustion engine.

Nikola Toshkovich died in 1893.
