= Serafima Ryangina =

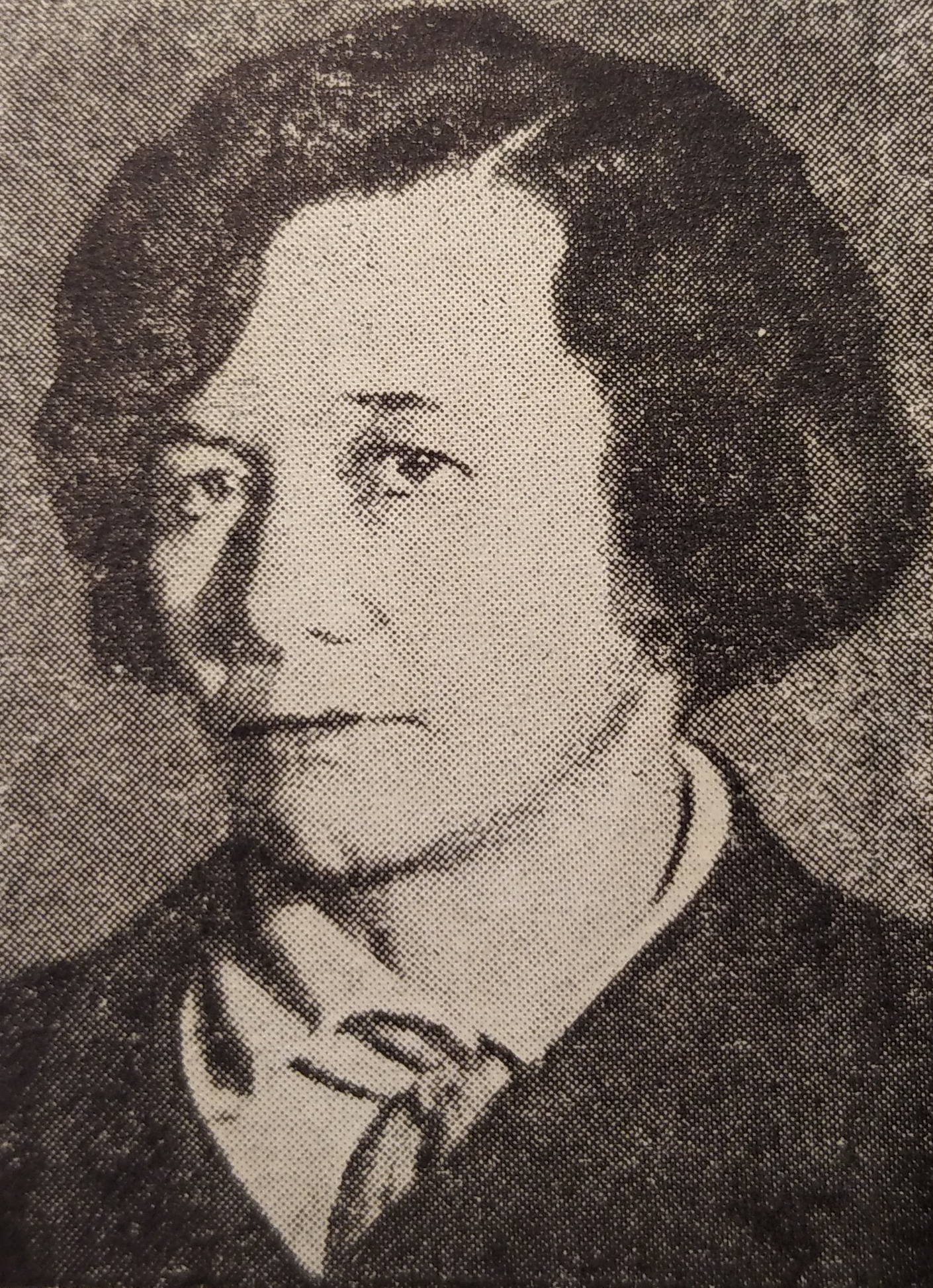

Serafima Vasilyevna Ryangina (1891 in St. Petersburg – 1955 in Moscow) was a Socialist Realist artist who was designated an Honoured Artist of Russia in 1955.

Ryangina trained under Dmitry Kardovsky at the St Petersburg Academy of Arts between 1912–18 and 1921–23, and subsequently moved to Moscow where she lived for the rest of her life. From 1924, Ryangina was a member of the Association of Artists of Revolutionary Russia (AKhRR).

Ryangina's Higher and Higher (1934), with its image of two young engineers installing electrical cables high above the ground, has been called "an obvious panegyric to the Soviet Second Five Year Plan" while others have commented on the extreme vitality and sunny demeanor of the two figures. The work received contemporary criticism from Izvestiya for its "chocolate-box sweetness" which made the building of socialism seem like an afternoon outing.

Ryangina's works are found in the State Tretyakov Gallery (Moscow), the State Russian Museum (St. Petersburg), and elsewhere in Russia and the former Soviet Union.

== Selected works ==
- The Ancient Steps, 1928.
- Red Army Studio, 1928.
- Old Fort, Central Asia, 1930.
- Shablonschik T. Konakov, 1930.
- Medieval Fortress. Central Asia, 1930s.
- Propaganda Team, 1931. State Tretyakov Gallery, Moscow.
- Higher and Higher, 1934.
- Portrait of the Artist B.N. Yakovlev, 1940s.
