= Olga Della-Vos-Kardovskaya =

Russian artist (1875–1952)

- Ольга Делла-Вос-Кардовская
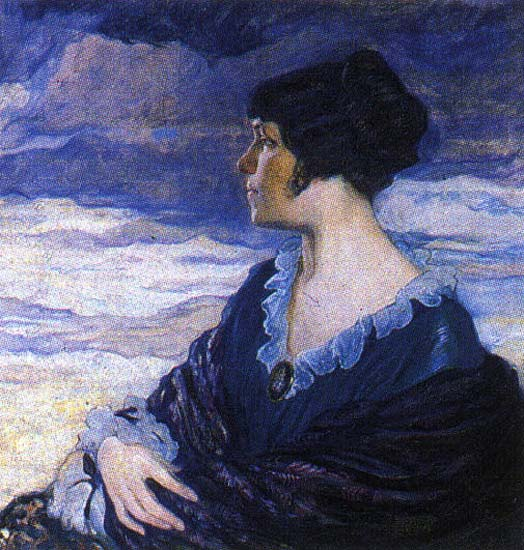
- Self-Portrait, 1917, oil on canvas, 67.6 by 65.6 cm; Russian Museum, St. Petersburg
- Born: Olga Lyudvigovna Della-Vos; 14 September [O.S. 2 September] 1875; Chernigov, Russian Empire
- Died: 9 August 1952 (aged 76); Leningrad, Soviet Union
- Resting place: Bogoslovskoe Cemetery, St. Petersburg
- Citizenship: Russia; Soviet Union
- Education: Imperial Academy of Arts
- Known for: Portrait painting
- Spouse: Dmitry Kardovsky (m. 1899; died 1943)

Olga Lyudvigovna Della-Vos-Kardovskaya (Russian: О́льга Лю́двиговна Де́лла-Вос-Кардо́вская; 14 September [O.S. 2 September] 1875 – 9 August 1952) was a Russian painter and draughtsman during the Modernist period, primarily known for her portraits.

From 1891 until 1894 she studied at the Schneider School in Kharkov; from 1894 to 1899 she was a student at the Academy in Saint Petersburg. She went to Munich to study at Anton Ažbe's school, staying there from 1899 to 1900. In April 1899, she married fellow painter Dmitry Kardovsky. Her mother, Mariya Della-Vos was a Bulgarian from Odessa and member of the Toshkovic family and daughter of Stefan Toshkovich and sister from Nikola Toshkovich.

Between 1903 and 1917, she exhibited with the New Society of Artists founded and led by her husband; from 1911 until 1916 she also exhibited with the Union of Russian Artists. She was associated with the Zhar-tsvet group from 1924 to 1928. She was included in a large 1927 exhibit in Moscow commemorating the tenth anniversary of the Russian Revolution.

== Works ==
Works by Della-Vos-Kardovskaya from the pre-Revolutionary years, in public domain
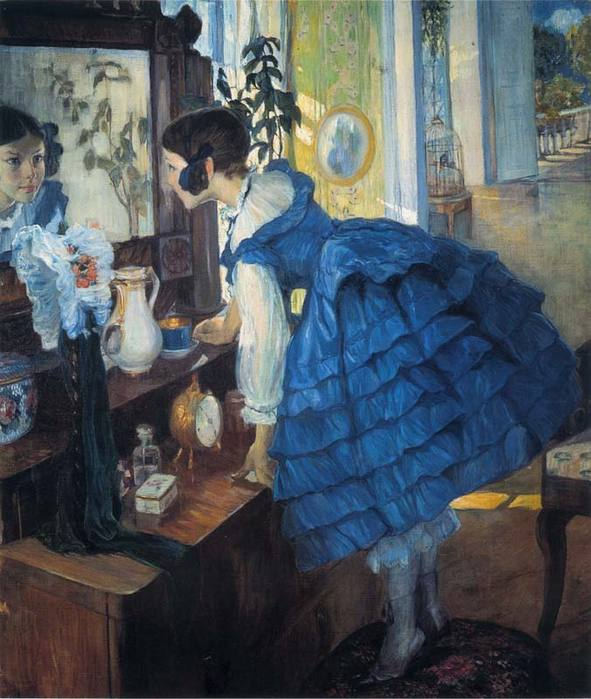
Little Woman, portrayal of the Kardovsky's daughter Yekaterina, 1910, oil on canvas, 129.5 by 110.5 cm; Russian Museum, St. Petersburg

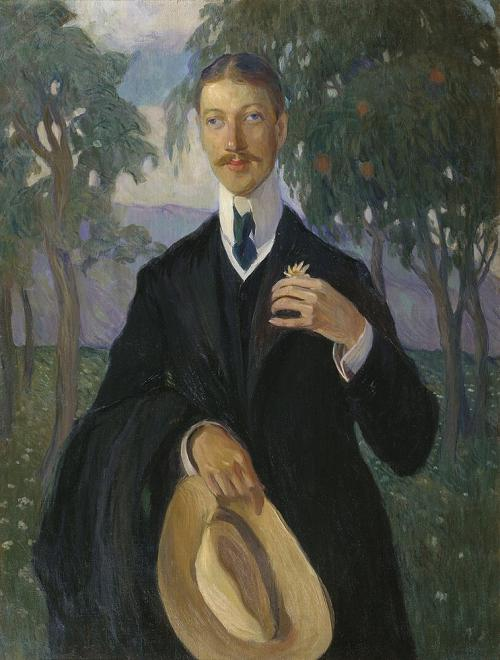
Nikolai Gumilev, 1909, oil on canvas, 105 by 80 cm; Tretyakov Gallery, Moscow

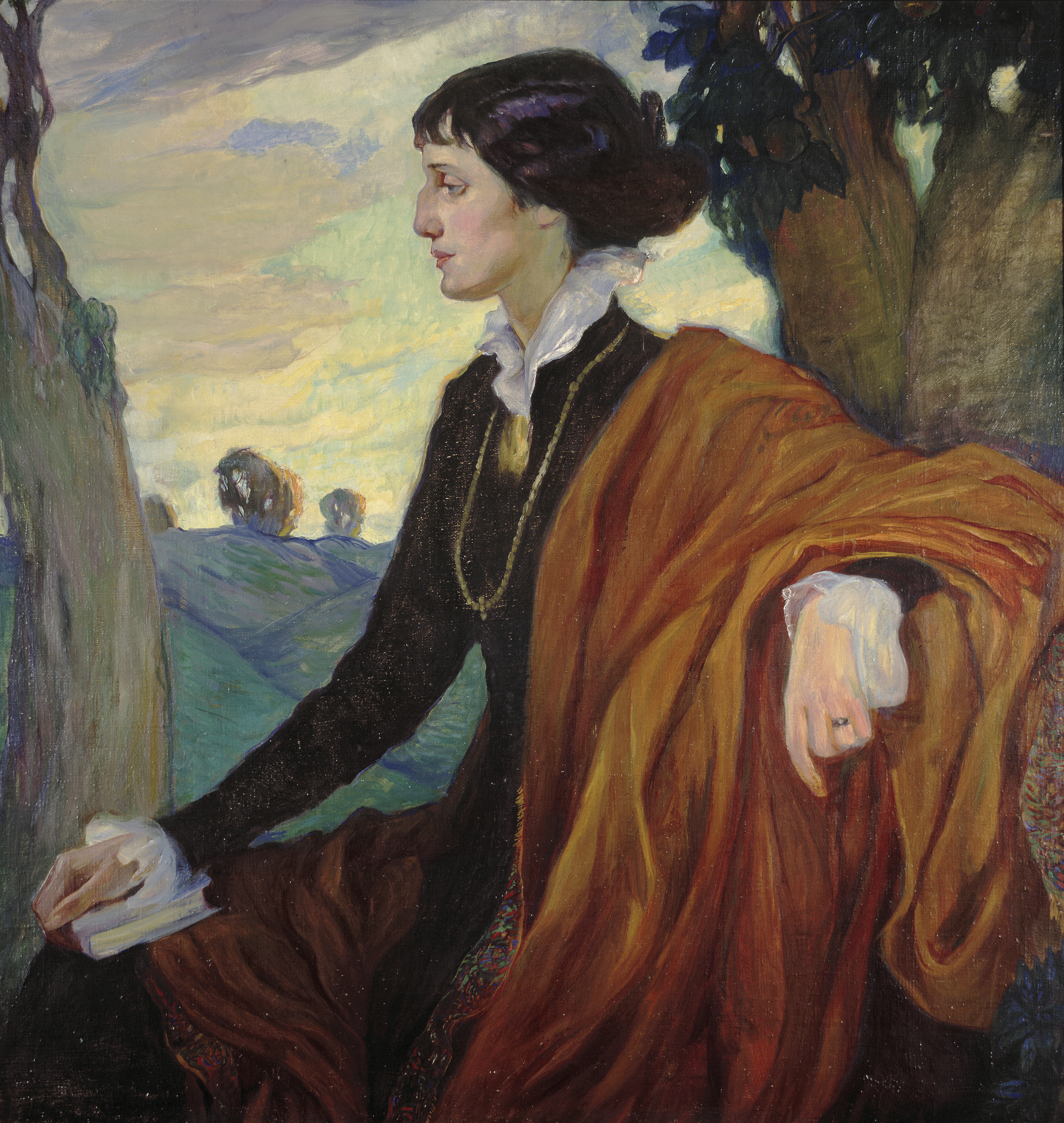
Anna Akhmatova, 1914, oil on canvas, 85 by 82 cm; Tretyakov Gallery, Moscow

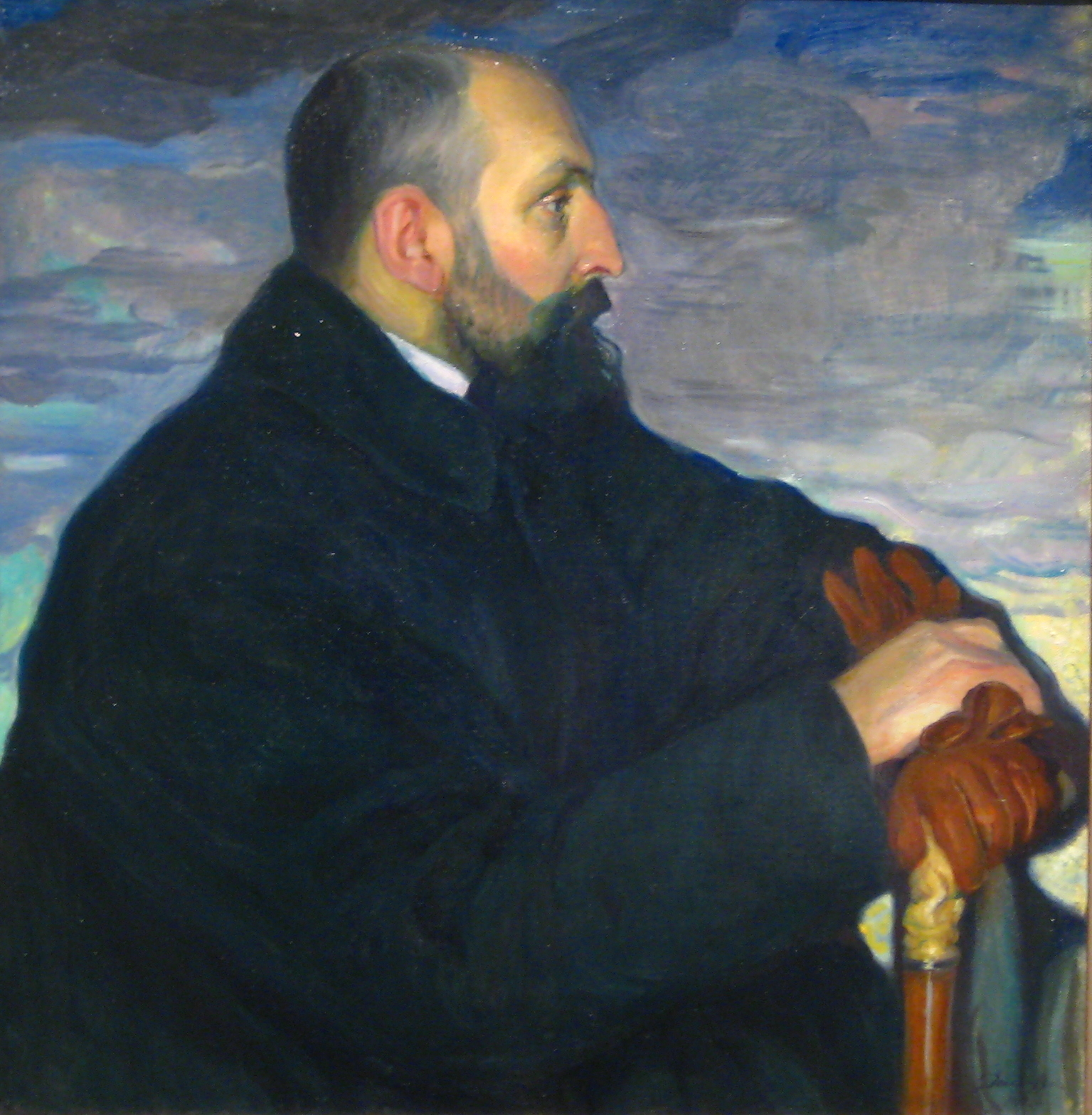
Dmitry Kardovsky, 1913, oil on canvas, 67 by 64 cm; Tretyakov Gallery, Moscow
