= Fountain House (Saint Petersburg) =

Coordinates: 59.9365°N 30.3454°E

The Fountain House
- Фонтанный дом
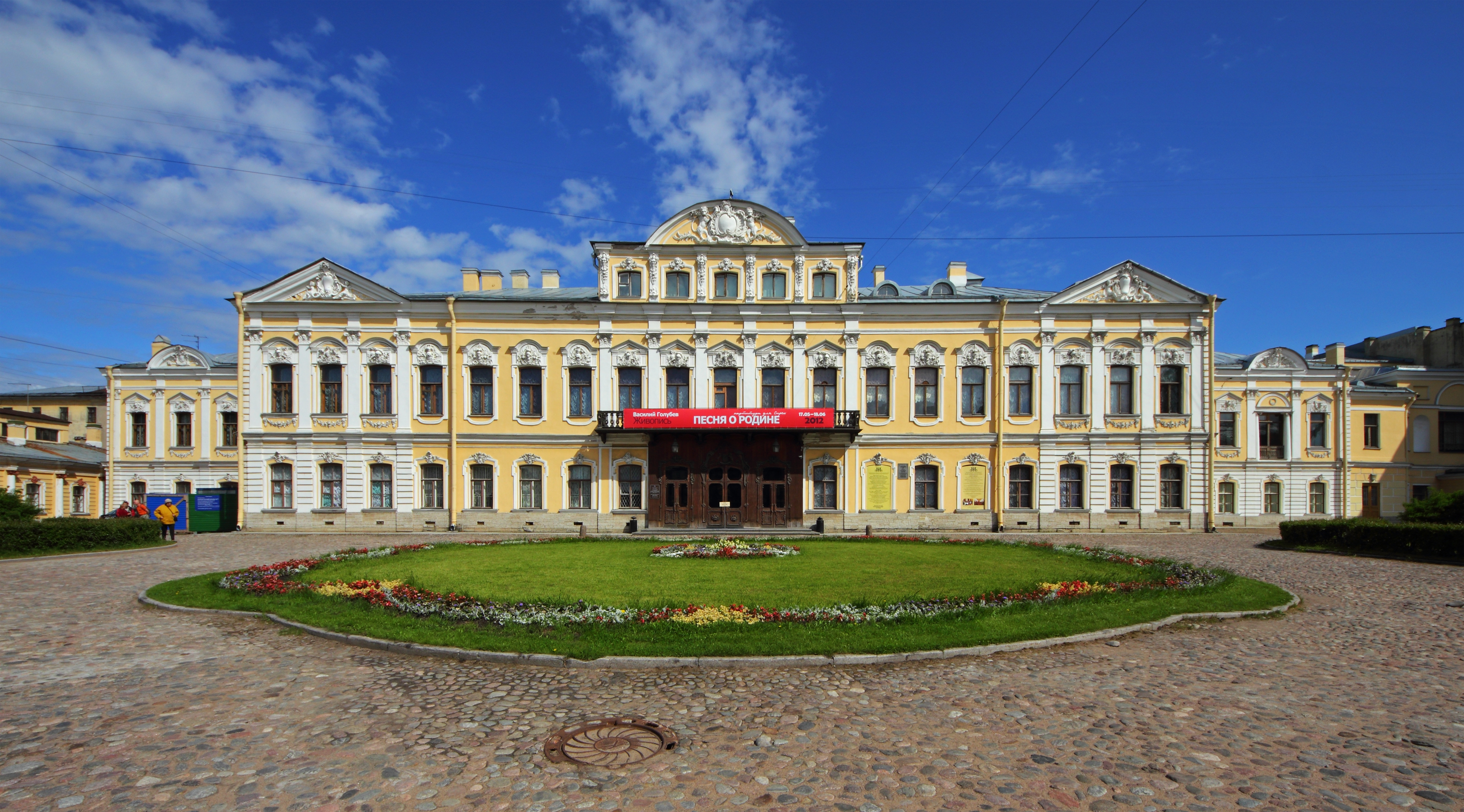
- Front view, 2012

General information
- Architectural style: Baroque, eclectism
- Completed: 1712

The Fountain House is a palace in Russia built by the Sheremetev family, named after the nearby Fontanka river. Since its erection in 1712 the building was reconstructed several times by famous architects G. Dmitryev, Savva Chevakinsky, Fyodor Argunov, and Ivan Starov. It is also known as the Sheremetev Palace.

== History ==
=== Construction ===
The land was granted by Peter the Great to Boris Sheremetev in 1712 with an order to build a European-style palace. At the time the main city residence of the Sheremetevs was situated at the Spit of Vasilyevsky Island, so the land near the bank of Fontanka was used as a country estate.

In 1719 Pyotr Borisovich inherited the estate. In late 1730s, when in the close vicinity Bartolomeo Rastrelli built gorgeous residences for the Empress Elizabeth, he invited an architect Dmitriev to build here a one-store stone palace. Twenty years later the building was reconstructed by Savva Chevakinsky and Fyodor Argunov and decorated to suit the nearby palaces, presumably on the basis of Rastrelli's schemes.

In 1788, the palace was refurbished by Ivan Starov. Apart from the luxurious interiors, the palace contained an extraordinary collection of arts — paintings of Raphael, Antonio da Correggio, Paolo Veronese, Rembrandt, etc.

=== 20th Century ===
After the October revolution, the palace was nationalized and used as a location for different organisations throughout the 20th century. From 1918 to 1931 there was a Museum of Noble Household, based on private collections of art, accumulated by the Sheremetevs in 200 years. Later the collection was moved to the Winter Palace and the Fountain house was remodeled into а research institute, all the historical interiors were destroyed. In 1990 the palace was given to the Museum of Theatre and Music, since late 1980s started the restoration.

== St. Petersburg Museum of Music ==
It is a branch of the State Museum of Music and Theater Art .Opened in 1990, nowadays the Museum offers its visitors a vast collection of more than 3000 musical instruments, one of the five biggest in the world and the best in Russia.

In 2014 ‘Monte Generoso’ composition was donated to the museum by the Swiss jeweller Willi Inauen.

== Akhmatova Museum ==
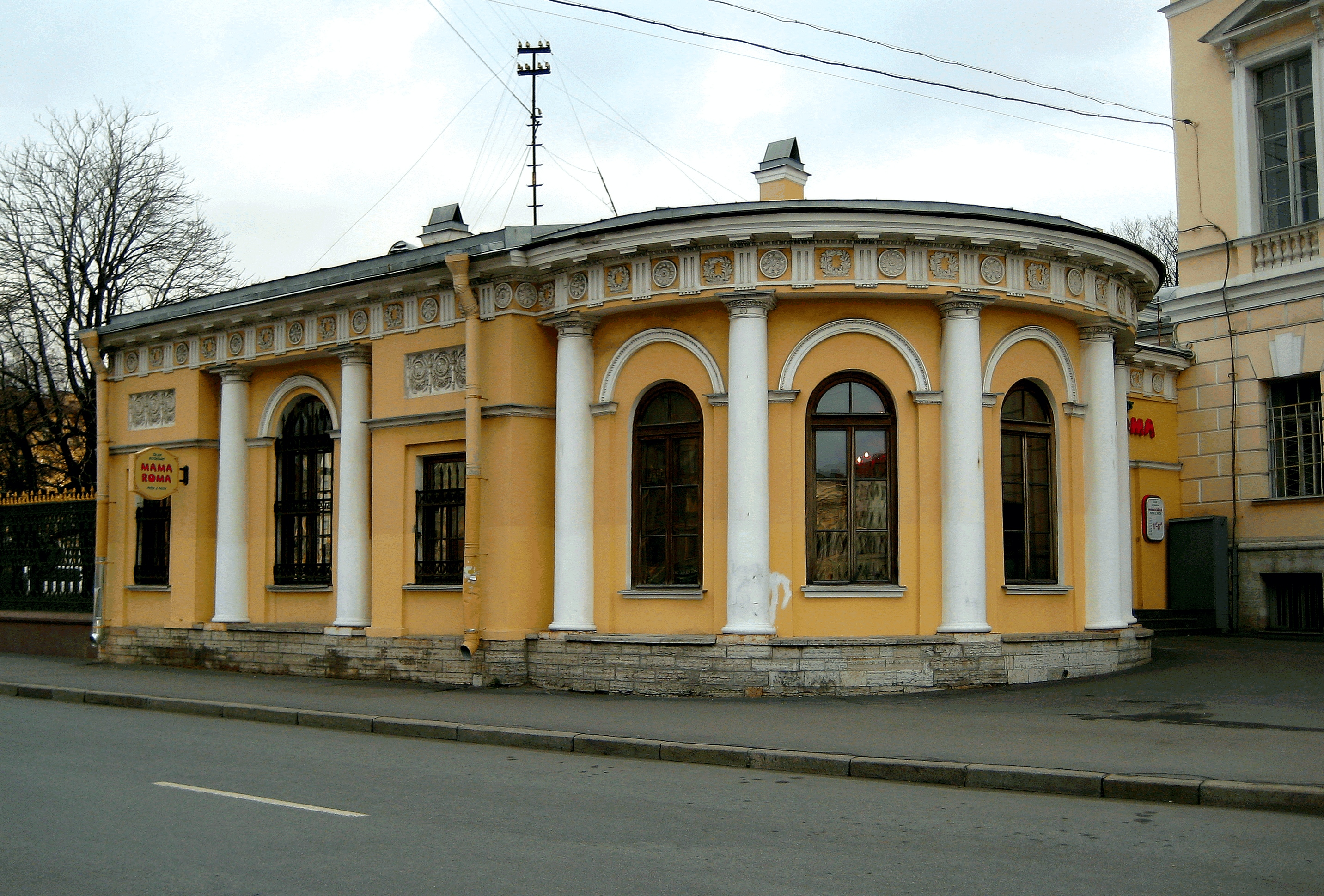
South Pavilion, 2012

The famous Russian poet Anna Akhmatova lived in the Fountain house twice, first in 1918–1920 with her second husband Vladimir Shileyko (in the South garden wing). Later, in 1944-1952 she stayed in the North wing with her spouse Nikolay Punin. The Akhmatova memorial museum works here since 1989.

== Sources ==
- Giangrande, Cathy (2003). Saint Petersburg: Museums, Palaces, and Historic Collections. Boston: Bunker Hill Publishing. p. 64-65. ISBN 1593730004.
- Shvidkovsky, Dmitrii (2007). Russian Architecture and the West. London: Yale University Press. p. 339. ISBN 978-0-300-10912-2.
- George, Arthur L. (2003). St. Petersburg: Russia's Window to the Future. Taylor Trade Publishing. p. 139. ISBN 9781589790179.
- Figes, Orlando (2018). "2". Natasha's Dance: A Cultural History of Russia. Penguin UK. ISBN 9780141989594.
