= Nikolay Tyrsa =

Russian painter (1887–1942)

Nikolay Andreyevich Tyrsa
- Никола́й Андре́евич Ты́рса
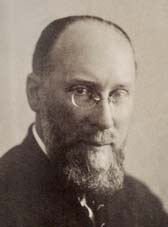
- Born: 9 May 1887; Aralik
- Died: 10 February 1942 (aged 55); Vologda

Nikolay Andreyevich Tyrsa (9 May 1887 – 10 February 1942) was a Russian painter. Nikolay Punin admired his work, in 1916 describing it as "organic, powerful and steady art; art, which we have been long waiting for, which we called for – the way to the art of the future."

From 1905 to 1909, Tyrsa studied under Léon Bakst at the St. Petersburg Academy of Arts.

During the siege of Leningrad Tyrsa became seriously ill and was evacuated to Vologda on 29 January 1942. He died there several days later.
