= Leonid Punin =

Russian military officer

Leonid Nikolayevich Punin (born Ataman Nikolayevich Punin; 1892–1916) was a Russian hero of the First World War, a Russian partisan and head of the special squad of the Northern Front.

== Family ==
Leonid Punin was born Ataman Punin in 1892, to military doctor Nikolay Mikhaylovich Punin and an unknown actress. His elder brother, Nikolay Punin, became a famous Soviet art critic who later died in a concentration camp as a result of his opposition to Stalin's regime. Alexander Punin, Leonid's second eldest brother, fought in the First World War and later became a biologist. His younger brother Lev Punin also went into the military. Zinaida, the only sister, married Josef Bulack-Balakhowitch and moved to Poland where she died in 1983.

== Military career, 1914–1915 ==
Ataman Punin graduated from Pavlovskoje's Voennoe Uchilische (a military school) then joined the 8th Finnish shooters regiment, with whom he fought German and Austrian troops in the first half of 1915. Punin then was made the head of rager's squad of that regiment. For his courage, this officer was awarded with Saint George's Cross (4th class), St. Vladimir's cross (4th class with swords and bow), and many other military orders.

== Ataman Punin's squad ==
In September 1915 Punin (then commanding officer) started a project for a partisan squad. That project received support from members of the Russian Royal Family and by November 1915 he had begun to put together the squad. By November 26 the completed squad consisted of 10 officers and more than 300 soldiers. Among them there were 37 Latvians (from the 2nd Latvian shooters battalion), and about 50 people who knew Polish and German.

The squad became a school for the future White Generals. Among the officers of Punin's squad were Baron Ungern-Shternberg (commander of the 3d squadron and in the Russian Civil War, the first White General), Stanislaw and Jusef Bulack-Balakhowitch (Polish Bułak-Bałachowicz who then fought for the independence of Belarus), Georghij Dombrovsky (Polish Jerzy Dąmbrowski, a famous partisan known as "Lupaschka"), Illarion Stavskij (commander of a battalion of the Talabaski regiment in the Civil War), and Nikolay Zujev Зуев, Николай Алексеевич (called a "Russian James Bond," a double agent who worked both for Stalin and the White Army).

Punin's squad was the only partisan regiment on the Russian Northern Front. It fought against German troops near Riga (Kemeri), taking part in the battles of Mittaw (December 1916) and Riga (Summer 1917). The regiment worked so well that the Grand Dukes and commanders awarded its members with military orders and medals.

He was shot and killed in a battle with German troops on September 1 of 1916 near Anticiems. He was buried in the town of Pavlovsk (near St. Petersburg, Russia).

His brother Alexandre succeeded him as leader of the squad. In March 1917 the squad received a new official name: "Ataman Punin's Special Squad."

The squad remained active until disbanding in February 1918.
