= Nikolay Punin =

Russian art scholar and writer (1888–1953)

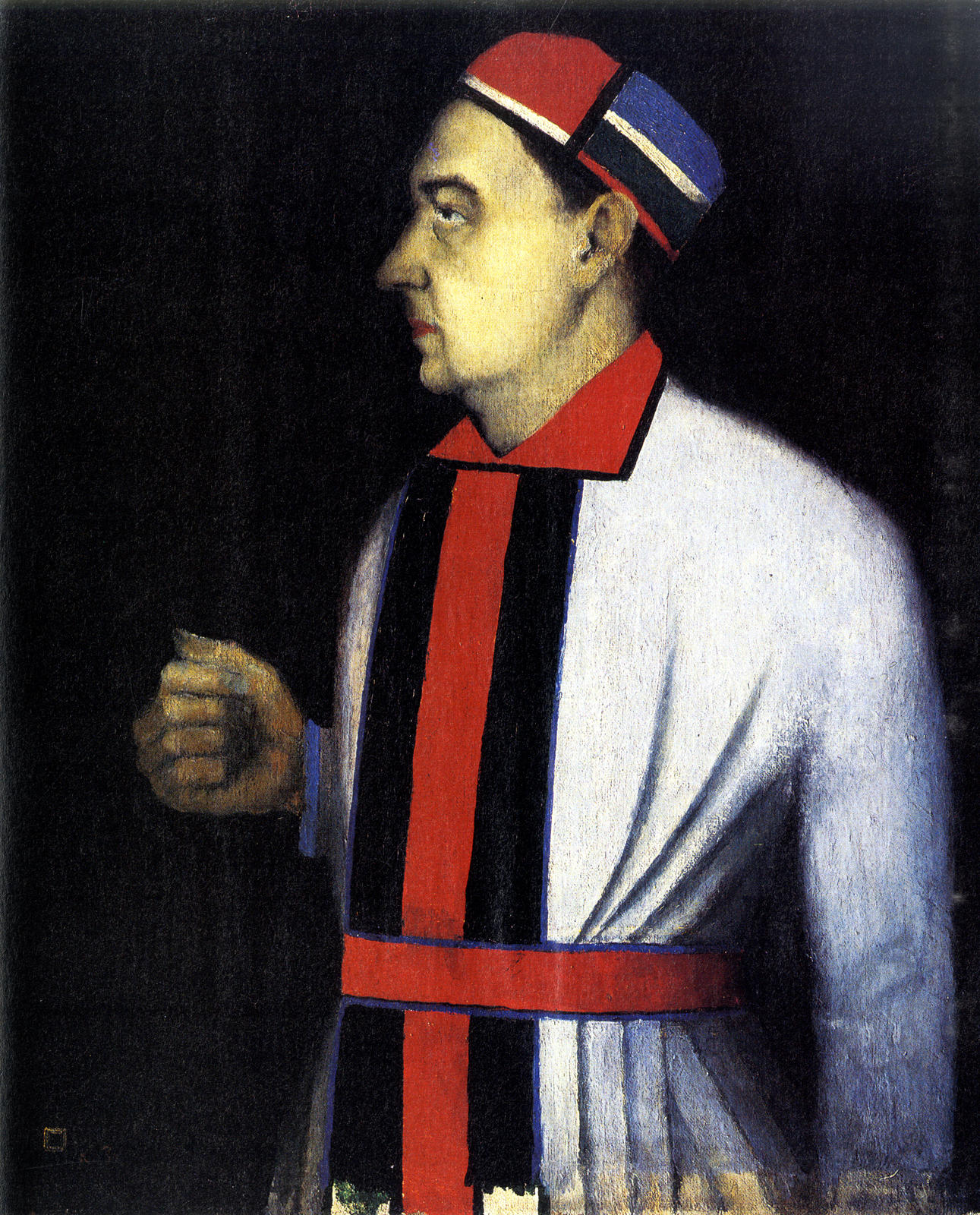
- Portrait of Punin by Kazimir Malevich
- Born: Nikolay Nikolayevich Punin; 28 November [O.S. 16 November] 1888; Helsingfors, Grand Duchy of Finland, Russian Empire
- Died: 21 August 1953 (aged 64); Vorkutlag, Russian SFSR, Soviet Union
- Occupations: Scholar, writer
- Spouse: Anna Arens (1917–?)
- Partner: Anna Akhmatova
- Children: 1
- Writing career
- Subjects: Contemporary art; art history
- Notable work: Diaries

Nikolay Nikolayevich Punin (Russian: Николай Николаевич Пунин; 28 November [O.S. 16 November] 1888 – 21 August 1953) was a Russian art scholar and writer. He edited several magazines, such as Izobrazitelnoye Iskusstvo among others, and was also co-founder of the Department of Iconography in the State Russian Museum. Punin was a lifelong friend and common-law husband of poet Anna Akhmatova who is famous for writing the poem Requiem.

== Biography ==
=== A key figure in the Russian art world ===
Nikolay Punin was born in Helsingfors (Helsinki), Grand Duchy of Finland, into the family of Nikolay Mikhaylovich Punin, a Medical Doctor of the Imperial Russian Army stationed in Helsingfors. Nikolay's younger brother Leonid Punin was later to become a commander in the White armies. Young Punin moved to St. Petersburg and attended the classical gymnasium where he first met young student Anna Akhmatova. From 1907 to 1914, Punin attended the St. Petersburg University, studied history of art under professor Dmitry Aynalov, graduating in 1914, as an art historian, and began a career as an art critic and editor. Punin's involvement in such schools as Acmeism, Constructivism, Formalism, and other developments in art and culture, eventually made him one of the key figures in the Russian art world.

Punin was among the first art critics who focused on the emerging new trends and styles. Punin's own multi-cultural exposure, as well as his diverse education and broad vision, made him the leading ideologist of the "Left Art", embracing and representing many innovative and experimental movements. Punin was nicknamed a "Futurist" and a "Leftist" by both artists and historians. His circle of friends included artists Kazimir Malevich, Vladimir Tatlin, Vladimir Lebedev, Lev Bruni, Nikolay Tyrsa, and others. He welcomed the October revolution as an opportunity to establish new art.

In 1917, Punin married Anna Arens, a physician; they had one daughter, Irina.

In 1918, Punin was appointed by Anatoli Lunacharsky to several important positions, such as the Head of the Petrograd Committee for Education (Narkompros), People's Commissar of the Russian Museum and the Hermitage Museum. For the next thirty years, Punin held several posts at the State Russian Museum.

=== Union with Anna Akhmatova ===
Nikolay Punin was in a civil union with poet Anna Akhmatova during the 1920s and 1930s. Punin and Akhmatova had much in common since the years of their youth, when both were students in Tsarskoye Selo. They had regular meetings since 1913, when both worked with the "Apollon" publishing in St. Petersburg. At that time, Akhmatova was married to Nikolay Gumilev, and Punin was a regular guest in their home during the 1910s. In 1922, Akhmatova came to visit Punin at his home in the garden wing of the Sheremetyev Palace. She eventually moved in with Punin, and their relationship lasted fifteen years until his arrest and exile in the gulag. The home of Punin and Akhmatova was a meeting place for the St. Petersburg's cultural milieu, and later became the Anna Akhmatova Literary and Memorial Museum.

Akhmatova had saved Punin's life after his first arrest, in the 1930s, despite their relationship having ended at that time. Nikolay Punin was released only after Anna Akhmatova's written petition to Joseph Stalin, but later he was arrested again. Punin was twice arrested and imprisoned by the Soviet secret service under the dictatorship of Stalin.

In November of 1941, during the Second World War Akhmatova was one of the few writers chosen to be flown out from the Siege of Leningrad by the order of Stalin, so she and Nikolay Punin were saved from starvation and death, and transferred from besieged Leningrad to Tashkent and Samarkand for three years until 1944.

=== Under Stalin's dictatorship ===
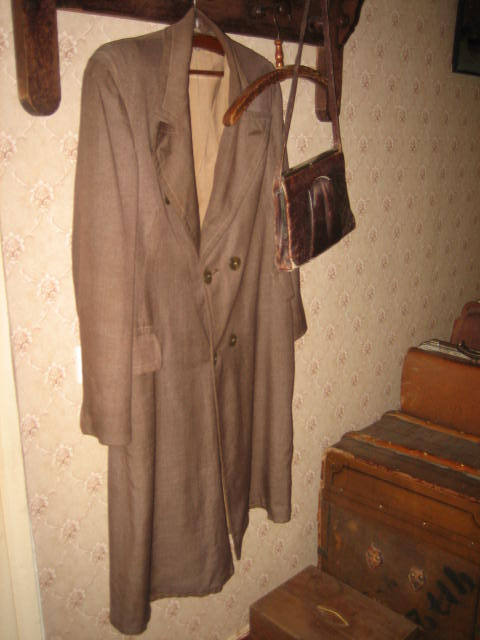
After the arrest of Punin, his common law spouse Akhmatova kept his coat in its place as a memorial in hope of his comeback from GULAG. It is still there, now in the Anna Akhmatova Literary and Memorial Museum

A secret file on Punin was created with numerous accusations of his anti-Soviet activity. Most accusations were fabricated by various agents of the former Soviet KGB office in Leningrad, such as Lt. Prussakov, who accused "former professor of Leningrad University and Academy of arts, Punin" of "anti-Soviet" propaganda. Punin's popular lectures about European artists, such as Rembrandt and Impressionists were seen by the communists as evidence of his anti-Soviet activity.

In 1949, Punin was arrested on accusations of "anti-Soviet" activity, because he said that many thousands of Lenin's portraits are tasteless. The Soviet government punished Punin by imprisonment in the Gulag camp, Abezlag a subcamp of Minlag in Komi ASSR, where he died.

=== Legacy ===
Punin was known as "savior of art collections" because he protected many valuable paintings of western artists, which were labeled "decadent bourgeois art" by the communist propaganda. In doing so, Punin took many risks by raising his voice in opposition to the Soviet officials. As curator of the Hermitage Museum and the Russian museum Punin saved many important masterpieces of art from destruction by revolutionary mob and undereducated communists. He was severely attacked by the Soviet communists for his efforts in preservation of "Western" art in Soviet museums. He was respected by artists and intellectuals as a key figure in Russian art history.

Punin was also a remarkable lecturer; his lectures were extremely popular among open-minded members of the Soviet Academia, and among his numerous students.

Punin's art essays and his memoirs were published in English and in Russian.

In June 2012, the first biography of Punin, The Unsung Hero of the Russian Avant-Garde. The Life and Times of Nikolay Punin, written by art historian Natalia Murray, was published by Brill.

== See also ==
- Fine Art of Leningrad
- Rykov A. Between a Conservative Revolution and Bolshevism. Nikolai Punin's Total Aesthetic Mobilization" // The New Literary Observer №140 (4/2016) pp. 240-258.
- Rykov A. Russian Modernism as Fascism. The Case of Nikolay Punin // Art and Politics in Europe in the Modern Period. Zagreb, 2016. pp. 81-82.
