= Adskaya Pochta =

Russian magazine

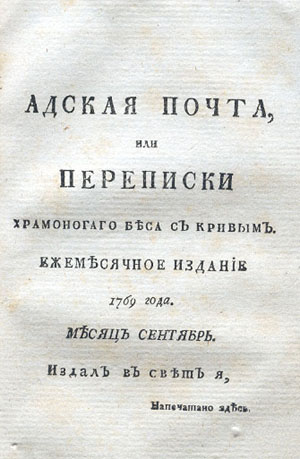
Adskaya Pochta

Adskaya Pochta (Russian: "Адская почта", which may be translated as Infernal Post) was a Russian monthly magazine, established by Fyodor Emin in Saint Petersburg in 1769.

Adskaya Pochta came out in the form of correspondence between two demons, who exposed the swindles of various government officials, landowners' inhumane treatment of their serfs, and vices of the clergy. The magazine's harsh polemics with the Vsyakaya vsyachina magazine (headed by Empress Catherine II) led to its closing. Only 6 issues of the magazine saw the light of day.
