= Anna Akhmatova =

Russian and Soviet poet (1889–1966)

- Анна Ахматова
- Akhmatova, c. 1926–1928
- Born: Anna Andreevna Gorenko; 23 June [O.S. 11 June] 1889; Odessa, Russian Empire (now in Ukraine)
- Died: 5 March 1966 (aged 76); Moscow, Soviet Union
- Resting place: Komarovskoye Cemetery, Komarovo, St. Petersburg
- Occupations: Poet; translator; memoirist
- Spouses: Nikolai Gumilev (m. 1910; div. 1918) Vladimir Shileyko (m. 1918; div. 1926)
- Partner: Nikolay Punin (died 1953)
- Children: Lev Gumilev
- Writing career
- Movement: Acmeism

Anna Andreyevna Gorenko (Note: Russian: А́нна Андре́евна Горе́нко, IPA: [ˈanːə ɐnˈdrʲe(j)ɪvnə ɡɐˈrʲenkə]; Ukrainian: А́нна Андрі́ївна Горе́нко, romanized: Ánna Andríyivna Horénko, IPA: [ˈɑnːɐ ɐnˈd⁽ʲ⁾r⁽ʲ⁾ijiu̯nɐ ɦoˈrɛnko].) (23 June [O.S. 11 June] 1889 – 5 March 1966), known by her pen name Anna Akhmatova, (Note: /əkˈmɑːtəvə/ ək-MAH-tə-və, /ˌɑːkməˈtoʊvə/ AHK-mə-TOH-və; Russian: А́нна Ахма́това, IPA: [ɐxˈmatəvə].) was a Russian and Soviet poet. She was nominated for the Nobel Prize in Literature in 1965 and 1966.

Akhmatova's work ranges from short lyric poems to intricately structured cycles, such as Requiem (1935–40), her tragic masterpiece about the Stalinist terror. Her style, characterised by its economy and emotional restraint, was strikingly original and distinctive to her contemporaries. The strong and clear leading female voice struck a new chord in Russian poetry. Her writing can be said to fall into two periods – the early work (1912–25) and her later work (from around 1936 until her death), divided by a decade of reduced literary output. Her work was condemned and censored by Stalinist authorities, and she is notable for choosing not to emigrate and remaining in the Soviet Union, acting as witness to the events around her. Her perennial themes include meditations on time and memory, and the difficulties of living and writing in the shadow of Stalinism.

Primary sources of information about Akhmatova's life are relatively scant, as war, revolution and the Soviet regime caused much of the written record to be destroyed. For long periods she was in official disfavour and many of those who were close to her died in the aftermath of the revolution. Akhmatova's first husband, Nikolai Gumilev, was executed by the Cheka, and her son Lev Gumilev and her common-law husband Nikolay Punin spent many years in the Gulag, where Punin died.

== Early life and family ==
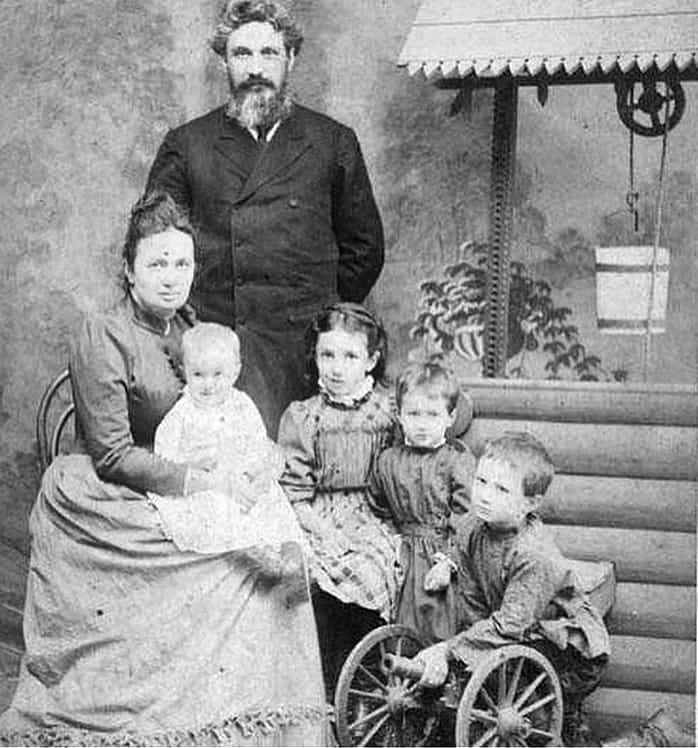
Inna Gorenko and Andrey Gorenko with their children Irina, Inna, Anna, Andrey 1893.

Anna Andreyevna Gorenko was born on 23 June [O.S. 11 June] 1889 at Bolshoy Fontan, a resort suburb of the Black Sea port of Odessa, then in the Russian Empire and now in Ukraine. Her father, Andrey Gorenko, was a descendant of a Ukrainian Cossack noble family, a naval engineer, later a civil servant in the rank of collegiate assessor, and her mother, Inna Erazmovna Stogova, was from a Russian pomeshchik (landowner) family with close ties to Kiev. She wrote:

No one in my large family wrote poetry. But the first Russian woman poet, Anna Bunina, was the aunt of my grandfather Erasm Ivanovich Stogov. The Stogovs were modest landowners in the Mozhaisk region of the Moscow Province. They were moved here after the insurrection during the time of Posadnitsa Marfa. In Novgorod they had been a wealthier and more distinguished family. Khan Akhmat, my ancestor, was killed one night in his tent by a Russian killer-for-hire. Karamzin tells us that this marked the end of the Mongol yoke on Russia. [...] It was well known that this Akhmat was a descendant of Genghiz Khan. In the eighteenth century, one of the Akhmatov Princesses – Praskovia Yegorovna – married the rich and famous Simbirsk landowner Motovilov. Yegor Motovilov was my great-grandfather; his daughter, Anna Yegorovna, was my grandmother. She died when my mother was nine years old, and I was named in her honour. Several diamond rings and one emerald were made from her brooch. Though my fingers are thin, still her thimble didn't fit me.

Her family moved north to Tsarskoye Selo, near Saint Petersburg, when she was eleven months old. The family lived in a house on the corner of Shirokaya Street and Bezymyanny Lane (the building is no longer there today), spending summers from age 7 to 13 in a dacha near Sevastopol. She studied at the Mariinskaya High School, moving to Kiev (1906–10) and finished her schooling there, after her parents separated in 1905. She went on to study law at Kiev University, leaving a year later to study literature in Saint Petersburg.

Akhmatova started writing poetry at the age of 11, and was published in her late teens, inspired by the poets Nikolay Nekrasov, Jean Racine, Alexander Pushkin, Yevgeny Baratynsky and the Symbolists; however, none of her juvenilia survive. Her sister Inna also wrote poetry though she did not pursue the practice and married shortly after high school. Akhmatova's father did not want to see any verses printed under his "respectable" name, so she chose to adopt her grandmother's distinctly Tatar surname 'Akhmatova' as a pen name.

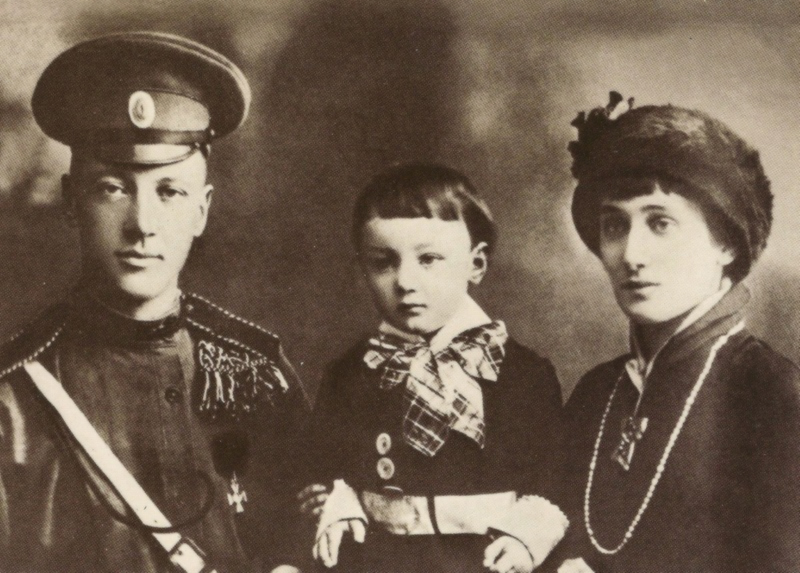
Anna Akhmatova with her husband Nikolai Gumilev and their son, Lev, 1915

Amedeo Modigliani's sketch of Anna Akhmatova (1911)

She met a young poet, Nikolai Gumilev, on Christmas Eve 1903. Gumilev encouraged her to write and pursued her intensely, making numerous marriage proposals starting in 1905. At 17 years old, in his journal Sirius, she published her first poem which could be translated as "On his hand you may see many glittering rings" (1907), signing it "Anna G." She soon became known in Saint Petersburg's artistic circles, regularly giving public readings. That year, she wrote unenthusiastically to a friend, "He has loved me for three years now, and I believe that it is my fate to be his wife. Whether or not I love him, I do not know, but it seems to me that I do." She married Gumilev in Kiev in April 1910; however, none of Akhmatova's family attended the wedding. The couple honeymooned in Paris, and there she met and befriended the Italian artist Amedeo Modigliani.

In late 1910, she came together with poets such as Osip Mandelstam and Sergey Gorodetsky to form the Guild of Poets. It promoted the idea of craft as the key to poetry rather than inspiration or mystery, taking themes of the concrete rather than the more ephemeral world of the Symbolists. Over time, they developed the influential Acmeist anti-symbolist school, concurrent with the growth of Imagism in Europe and America. From the first year of their marriage, Gumilev began to chafe against its constraints. She wrote that he had "lost his passion" for her, and by the end of that year he left on a six-month trip to Africa.

She had "her first taste of fame", becoming renowned, not so much for her beauty, but for her intense magnetism and allure, attracting the fascinated attention of a great many men, including the great and the good. She returned to visit Modigliani in Paris, where he created at least 20 paintings of her, including several nudes.

She later began an affair with the celebrated Acmeist poet Osip Mandelstam, whose wife, Nadezhda, declared later, in her autobiography that she came to forgive Akhmatova for it in time. Akhmatova's son, Lev, was born in 1912, and would become a renowned Neo-Eurasianist historian.

== Silver Age ==
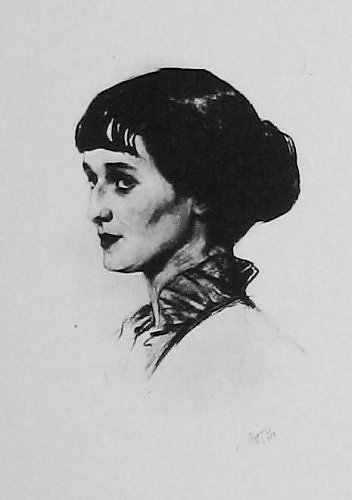
Anna Akhmatova in 1914, by Savely Sorin

In 1912, the Guild of Poets published Akhmatova's book of verse Evening (Vecher) – the first of five in nine years. (Note: 1912 – Vecher (Evening). 46 poems, 92 pages. 300 copies. Published by the Poets Guild. See Martin (2007) p. 4.) The small edition of 500 copies quickly sold out and she received around a dozen positive notices in the literary press. She exercised a strong selectivity for the pieces – including only 35 of the 200 poems she had written by the end of 1911. (She noted that Song of the Last Meeting, dated 29 September 1911, was her 200th poem.) The book secured her reputation as a new and striking young writer, the poems "Grey-eyed king", "In the Forest", "Over the Water", and "I don't need my legs anymore" making her famous. She later wrote, "These naïve poems by a frivolous girl for some reason were reprinted thirteen times [...] And they came out in several translations. The girl herself (as far as I recall) did not foresee such a fate for them and used to hide the issues of the journals in which they were first published under the sofa cushions".

At the time of the publication of her first collection, Akhmatova began to frequent the cabaret Brodyachyaya sobaka (English: Stray Dog) where she befriended the playwrights Velimir Khlebnikov and Vladimir Mayakovsky, the writer and composer Mikhail Kuzmin, and the composer Arthur Lourié. Her second collection, The Rosary (or Beads – Chetki) appeared in March 1914 and firmly established her as one of the most popular and sought after poets of the day. (Note: 1914 – Chetki (Rosary or literally Beads). 52 poems, 120 pages, published by Hyperborea. See Martin (2007) p. 4, and Wells (1996) p. 6.) Later that same year, Lourié became the first composer to set her poetry to music; selecting several verses from The Rosary. Akhmatova and Lourié had a romantic affair which began around this same time.

In response to The Rosary, thousands of women composed poems "in honour of Akhmatova", mimicking her style and prompting Akhmatova to exclaim: "I taught our women how to speak, but don't know how to make them silent". Her aristocratic manners and artistic integrity won her the titles "Queen of the Neva" and "Soul of the Silver Age", as the period came to be known in the history of Russian poetry. In Poem Without a Hero, the longest and one of the best known of her works, written many decades later, she would recall this as a blessed time of her life. (Note: Poem Without a Hero (Poema bez geroya) was inspired by Alexander Pushkin's Eugene Onegin)

Akhmatova became close friends with Boris Pasternak (who, though married, proposed to her many times) and rumours began to circulate that she was having an affair with influential lyrical poet Alexander Blok. In July 1914, Akhmatova wrote "Frightening times are approaching / Soon fresh graves will cover the land"; on 1 August, Germany declared war on Russia, marking the start of "the dark storm" of world war, civil war, revolution and totalitarian repression for Russia. The Silver Age came to a close.

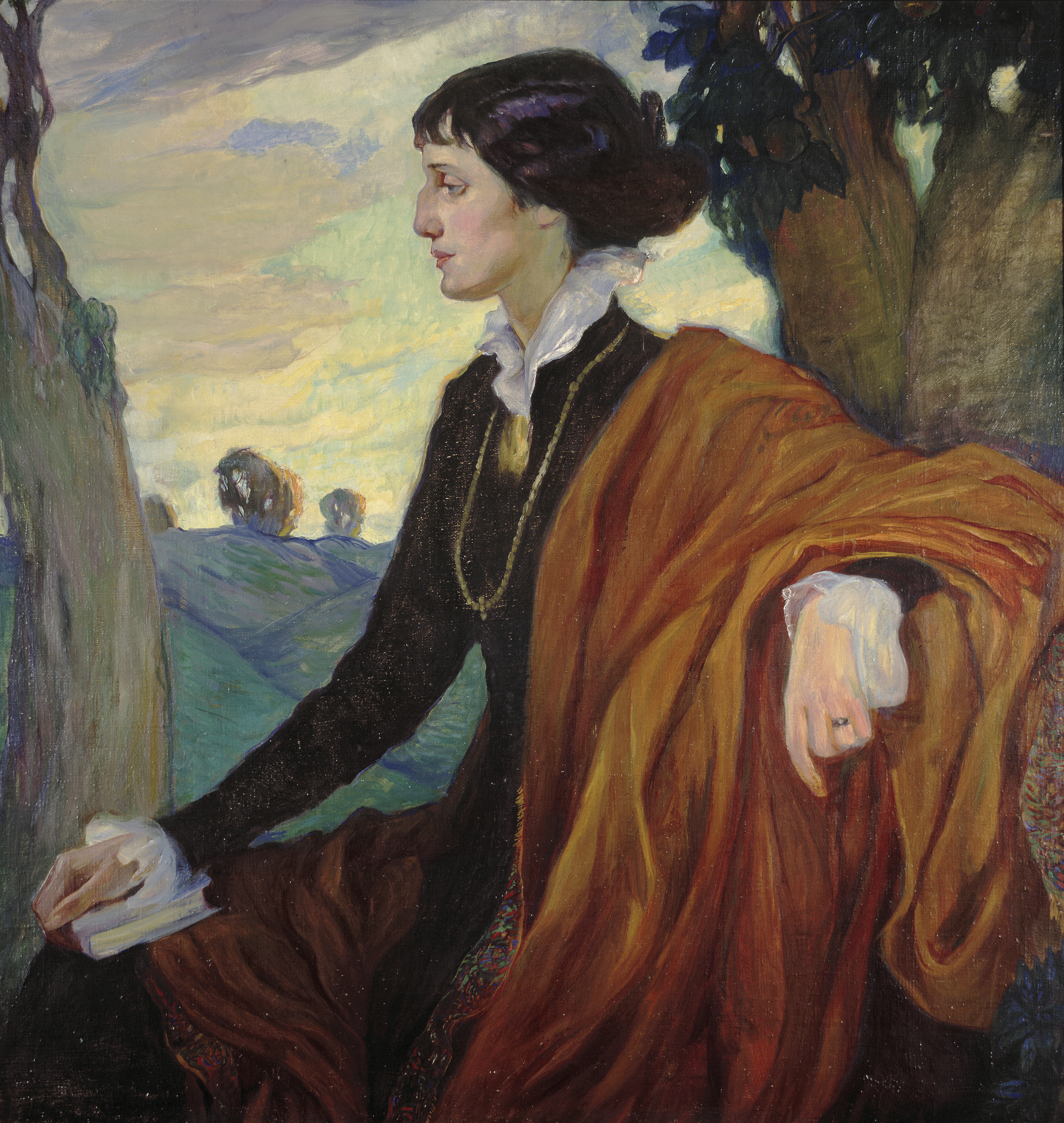
Portrait of Anna Akhmatova by Olga Della-Vos-Kardovskaya, 1914

Akhmatova had a relationship with the mosaic artist and poet Boris Anrep; many of her poems in the period are about him, and he in turn created mosaics in which she is featured. (Note: See here for mosaic images Mosaics located in the National Gallery in London. In the Cathedral of Christ the King Mullingar, Anrep's mosaic of Saint Anne is spelt Anna – the saint's image bears a close resemblance to Akhmatova in her mid-20s. He also depicted Akhmatova in a religious mosaic entitled Compassion.) (Note: For commentary on the relationship between Akhmatova and Anrep, see Wendy Rosslyn, "A propos of Anna Akhmatova: Boris Vasilyevich Anrep (1883–1969)", New Zealand Slavonic Journal 1 (1980): pp. 25–34.) She selected poems for her third collection, Belaya Staya (White Flock), in 1917, (Note: Anno Domini MCMXXI. 102 pages, 2000 copies published. Her last volume of new work. See Martin (2007) p. 6.) a volume which poet and critic Joseph Brodsky later described as writing of personal lyricism tinged with the "note of controlled terror". She later came to be memorialised by his description of her as "the keening muse". Essayist John Bayley describes her writing at this time as "grim, spare and laconic".

In February 1917, the revolution started in Saint Petersburg (then named Petrograd); soldiers fired on marching protestors, and others mutinied. They looked to a past in which the future was "rotting". In a city without electricity or sewage service, with little water or food, they faced starvation and sickness. Akhmatova's friends died around her and others left in droves for safer havens in Europe and America, including Anrep, who escaped to England. She had the option to leave, and considered it for a time, but chose to stay and was proud of her decision to remain:

You are a traitor, and for a green island,
Have betrayed, yes, betrayed your native
Land,
Abandoned all our songs and sacred
Icons,
And the pine tree over a quiet lake.

— "Green Island", trans. Jane Kenyon

Akhmatova wrote of her own temptation to leave:

A voice came to me. It called out comfortingly.
It said, "Come here,
Leave your deaf and sinful land,
Leave Russia forever,
I will wash the blood from your hands,
Root out the black shame from your heart,
[...] calmly and indifferently,
I covered my ears with my hands,
So that my sorrowing spirit
Would not be stained by those shameful words.

— "When in suicidal anguish", trans. Jane Kenyon

At the height of Akhmatova's fame, in 1918, she divorced her husband and that same year, though many of her friends considered it a mistake, Akhmatova married prominent Assyriologist and poet Vladimir Shilejko. She later said, "I felt so filthy. I thought it would be like a cleansing, like going to a convent, knowing you are going to lose your freedom." She had an affair with theatre director Mikhail Zimmerman, and lived for a period with Lourié in 1920.

== 1920s and 1930s ==
In 1921, Akhmatova's former husband Nikolay Gumilev was prosecuted for his alleged role in a monarchist anti-Bolshevik conspiracy and in August was executed via shooting by the Cheka along with 61 others. According to the historian Donald Rayfield, the murder of Gumilev was part of the state response to the Kronstadt rebellion. The Cheka blamed the rebellion on Petrograd's intellectuals, prompting the senior Cheka officer Yakov Agranov to forcibly extract the names of 'conspirators' from an imprisoned professor, guaranteeing them amnesty from execution. Agranov's guarantee proved to be meaningless. He sentenced dozens of the named persons to death, including Gumilev. Maxim Gorky and others appealed for leniency, but by the time Lenin agreed to several pardons, the condemned had been shot. Within a few days of his death, Akhmatova wrote:

Terror fingers all things in the dark,
Leads moonlight to the axe.
There's an ominous knock behind the wall:
A ghost, a thief or a rat...

The executions had a powerful effect on the Russian intelligentsia, destroying the Acmeist poetry group, and placing a stigma on Akhmatova and her son by Gumilev, Lev. Lev's later arrest during the purges and terrors of the 1930s was based on being his father's son. From a new Marxist perspective, Akhmatova's poetry was deemed to represent an introspective "bourgeois aesthetic", reflecting only trivial "female" preoccupations, not in keeping with these new revolutionary politics of the time. She was roundly attacked by the state and by former supporters and friends and seen to be an anachronism. During what she termed "The Vegetarian Years", Akhmatova's work was unofficially banned by a party resolution of 1925, and she found it hard to publish, though she did not stop writing poetry. She made acclaimed translations of works by Victor Hugo, Rabindranath Tagore, and Giacomo Leopardi and pursued academic work on Pushkin and Dostoyevsky. She worked as a critic and essayist, though many Soviet and foreign critics and readers concluded that she had died.

She had little food and almost no money; her son was denied access to study at academic institutions because of his parents' alleged anti-state activities. The nationwide repression and purges decimated her Saint Petersburg circle of friends, artists and intellectuals. Her close friend and fellow poet Mandelstam was deported and then sentenced to a Gulag labour camp, where he would die. Akhmatova narrowly escaped arrest, though her son Lev was imprisoned on numerous occasions by the Stalinist regime, accused of counterrevolutionary activity. She would often queue for hours to deliver him food packages and plead on his behalf. She describes standing outside a stone prison:

One day somebody in the crowd identified me. Standing behind me was a woman, with lips blue from cold, who had, of course, never heard me called by name before. Now she started out of the torpor common to us all and asked me in a whisper (everyone whispered there): 'Can you describe this?'
And I said: 'I can.'
Then something like a smile passed fleetingly over what had once been her face.

Akhmatova wrote that by 1935 every time she went to see someone off at the train station as they went into exile, she would find herself greeting friends at every step, as so many of Saint Petersburg's intellectual and cultural figures would be leaving on the same train. Of the members of her poetry circles, Mayakovsky and Yesenin committed suicide, and Marina Tsvetaeva would follow them in 1941 after returning from exile.

Akhmatova was a common-law wife to Nikolai Punin, an art scholar and lifelong friend, whom she stayed with until 1935. He also was repeatedly taken into custody, dying in the Gulag in 1953. (Note: Their home in The Fountain House, on the Fontanka river in St Petersburg, is now an Akhmatova museum.) Her tragic cycle Requiem documents her personal experience of this time; as she writes, "one hundred million voices shout" through her "tortured mouth".

Seventeen months I've pleaded
for you to come home.
Flung myself at the hangman's feet.
My terror, oh my son.
And I can't understand.
Now all's eternal confusion.
Who's beast, and who's man?
How long till execution?

— Requiem, trans. A.S. Kline, 2005

== 1939–1960 ==
In 1939, Stalin approved the publication of one volume of poetry, From Six Books; however, the collection was withdrawn and pulped after only a few months. In 1993, it was revealed that the authorities had bugged her flat and kept her under constant surveillance, keeping detailed files on her from this time, accruing some 900 pages of "denunciations, reports of phone taps, quotations from writings, confessions of those close to her". Although officially stifled, Akhmatova's work continued to circulate in secret. Akhmatova's close friend, chronicler Lydia Chukovskaya described how writers working to keep poetic messages alive used various strategies. A small, trusted circle would, for example, memorise each other's works and circulate them only by oral means. She tells how Akhmatova would write out her poem for a visitor on a scrap of paper to be read in a moment, then burnt in her stove. The poems were carefully disseminated in this way, but it is likely that many compiled in this manner were lost. "It was like a ritual," Chukovskaya wrote, "Hands, matches, an ashtray. A ritual beautiful and bitter."

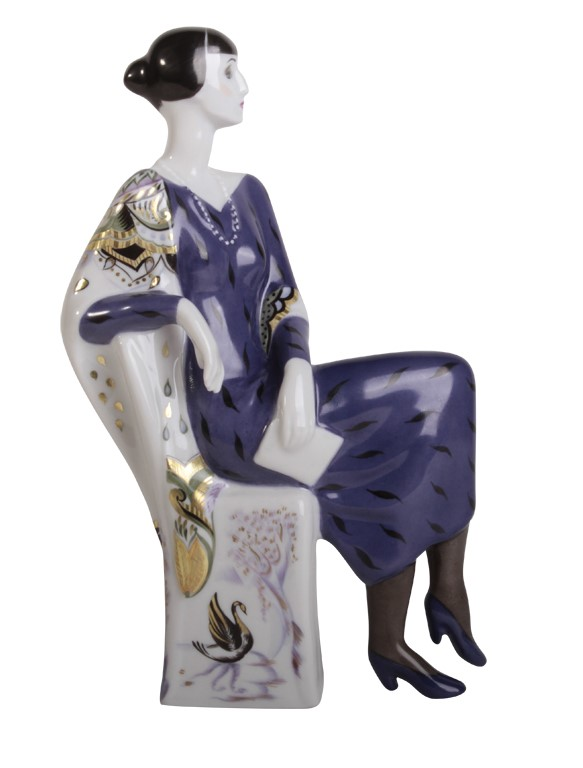
Porcelain

During World War II, Akhmatova witnessed the 900-day siege of Leningrad, now known by Saint Petersburg. In 1940, Akhmatova started her Poem without a Hero. She finished a first draft in Tashkent, but she worked on the poem for twenty years and considered it to be the major work of her life, dedicating it to "the memory of its first audience – my friends and fellow citizens who perished in Leningrad during the siege". She was evacuated to Chistopol in spring of 1942 and then to greener, safer Tashkent in Uzbekistan, along with other artists, such as Shostakovich. During her time away she became seriously ill with typhus (she had suffered from severe bronchitis and tuberculosis as a young woman). On returning to Leningrad in May 1944, she writes of how disturbed she was to find "a terrible ghost that pretended to be my city".

She regularly read to soldiers in the military hospitals and on the front line; her later pieces seem to be the voice of those who had struggled and the many she had outlived. She moved away from romantic themes towards a more diverse, complex and philosophical body of work and some of her more patriotic poems found their way to the front pages of Pravda.

In 1946 the Central Committee of the Communist Party, acting on the orders from Stalin, started an official campaign against the "bourgeois", individualistic works by Akhmatova and satirist Mikhail Zoshchenko. She was condemned for a visit by the Russian-born British liberal philosopher Isaiah Berlin in 1945, and Andrei Zhdanov publicly labelled her "half harlot, half nun", her work "the poetry of an overwrought, upper-class lady", her work the product of "eroticism, mysticism, and political indifference". He banned her poems from publication in the journals Zvezda and Leningrad, accusing her of poisoning the minds of Soviet youth. Her surveillance was increased, and she was expelled from the Union of Soviet Writers.

Berlin described his visit to her flat: "It was very barely furnished—virtually everything in it had, I gathered, been taken away—looted or sold—during the siege .... A stately, grey-haired lady, a white shawl draped about her shoulders, slowly rose to greet us. Anna Akhmatova was immensely dignified, with unhurried gestures, a noble head, beautiful, somewhat severe features, and an expression of immense sadness."

If a gag should blind my tortured mouth,
through which a hundred million people shout,

then let them pray for me, as I do pray
for them

— From Requiem (1940).
Trans. Kunitz and Hayward

Akhmatova's son Lev was arrested again at the end of 1949 and sentenced to 10 years in a Siberian prison camp. She spent much of the next years trying to secure his release; to this end, and for the first time, she published overtly propagandist poetry, "In Praise of Peace", in the magazine Ogoniok, openly supporting Stalin and his regime. Lev remained in the camps until 1956, well after Stalin's death, his final release potentially aided by his mother's concerted efforts. Bayley suggests that her period of pro-Stalinist work may also have saved her own life; notably, however, Akhmatova never acknowledged these pieces in her official corpus. Akhmatova's stature among Soviet poets was slowly conceded by party officials, her name no longer cited in only scathing contexts and she was readmitted to the Union of Writers in 1951, being fully recognised again following Stalin's death in 1953. With the press still heavily controlled and censored under Nikita Khrushchev, a translation by Akhmatova was praised in a public review in 1955, and her own poems began to re-appear in 1956. That same year Lev was released from the camps, embittered, believing that his mother cared more about her poetry than for him and that she had not worked hard for his release. Akhmatova's status was confirmed by 1958, with the publication of Stikhotvoreniya (Poems) and then Stikhotvoreniya 1909–1960 (Poems: 1909–1960) in 1961. Beg vremeni (The flight of time), collected works 1909–1965, published 1965, was the most complete volume of her works in her lifetime, though the long, damning poem Requiem, condemning the Stalinist purges, was conspicuously absent. Isaiah Berlin predicted at the time that it could never be published in the Soviet Union.

== Last years ==
A land not mine, still
forever memorable,
the waters of its ocean
chill and fresh.

Sand on the bottom whiter than chalk,
and the air drunk, like wine,
late sun lays bare
the rosy limbs of the pinetrees.

Sunset in the ethereal waves:
I cannot tell if the day
is ending, or the world, or if
the secret of secrets is inside me again.

— "A land not mine", 1964

During the last years of Akhmatova's life, she continued to live with the Punin family in Leningrad, still translating, researching Pushkin, and writing her own poetry. Though still censored, she was concerned to re-construct work that had been destroyed or suppressed during the purges or which had posed a threat to the life of her son in the camps, such as the lost, semi-autobiographical play Enûma Elish. (Note: "Enûma Elish" are the opening words of a Babylonian creation myth. It could be translated as "when at the summit". Accounts differ as to when it was destroyed. Polivanov, who knew Akhmatova, suggests it was written in Tashkent while she was suffering from typhus, and burnt in fear in 1944. The poet read the play to friends before burning it, and it is reported to concern the Kafkaesque imprisonment and trial of a woman poet, who does not why she has been interned, roundly condemning Stalin and the arbitrary nature of his purges. During the 1960s, Akhmatova tried to recall the text. Polivanov reports that her friend "could not remember her shortest poems, much less a long text". No text of the play is extant. [Polivanov (1994) pp.213–214].) She worked on her official memoirs, planned novels, and worked on her epic Poem without a Hero, 20 years in the writing.

Akhmatova was widely honoured in the USSR and the West. In 1962, she was visited by Robert Frost; Isaiah Berlin tried to visit her again, but she refused him, worried that her son might be re-arrested due to family association with the ideologically suspect western philosopher. She inspired and advised a large circle of key young Soviet writers. Her dacha in Komarovo was frequented by such poets as Yevgeny Rein and Joseph Brodsky, whom she mentored. Brodsky, arrested in 1963 and interned for social parasitism, would go on to win the Nobel Prize in Literature (1987) and become Poet Laureate (1991) as an exile in the US.

As one of the last remaining major poets of the Silver Age, she was newly acclaimed by the Soviet authorities as a fine and loyal representative of their country and permitted to travel. At the same time, by virtue of works such as Requiem, Akhmatova was being hailed at home and abroad as an unofficial leader of the dissident movement, and reinforced this image herself. She was becoming a representative of both the Soviet Union and Tsarist Russia, more popular in the 1960s than she had ever been before the revolution; this reputation only continuing to grow after her death. For her 75th birthday in 1964, new collections of her verse were published.

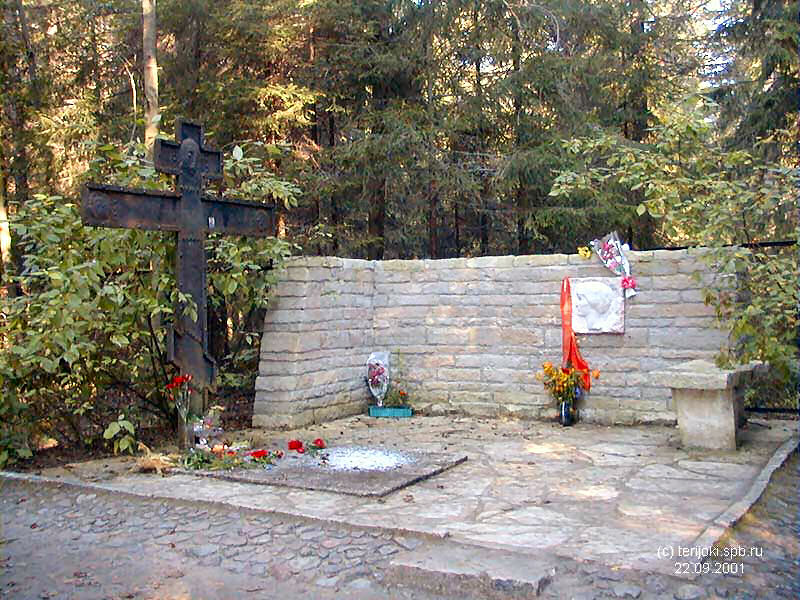
Anna Akhmatova's grave, Komarovo, Saint Petersburg

Akhmatova was able to meet some of her pre-revolutionary acquaintances in 1965, when she was allowed to travel to Sicily and England, in order to receive the Taormina prize and an honorary doctoral degree from Oxford University, accompanied by her lifelong friend and secretary Lydia Chukovskaya. Akhmatova's Requiem in Russian finally appeared in book form in Munich in 1963, the whole work not published within USSR until 1987. Her long poem The Way of All the Earth or Woman of Kitezh (Kitezhanka) was published in complete form in 1965.

In November 1965, soon after her Oxford visit, Akhmatova suffered a heart attack and was hospitalised. She was moved to a sanatorium in Moscow in the spring of 1966 and died of heart failure on 5 March, at the age of 76. Thousands attended the two memorial ceremonies, held in Moscow and in Leningrad. After being displayed in an open coffin, she was interred at Komarovo Cemetery in Saint Petersburg.

Isaiah Berlin described the impact of her life, as he saw it:

The widespread worship of her memory in Soviet Union today, both as an artist and as an unsurrendering human being, has, so far as I know, no parallel. The legend of her life and unyielding passive resistance to what she regarded as unworthy of her country and herself, transformed her into a figure [...] not merely in Russian literature, but in Russian history in [the twentieth] century.

In 1988, to celebrate what would have been Akhmatova's 100th birthday, Harvard University held an international conference on her life and work. Today her work may be explored at the Anna Akhmatova Literary and Memorial Museum in Saint Petersburg.

== Work and themes ==
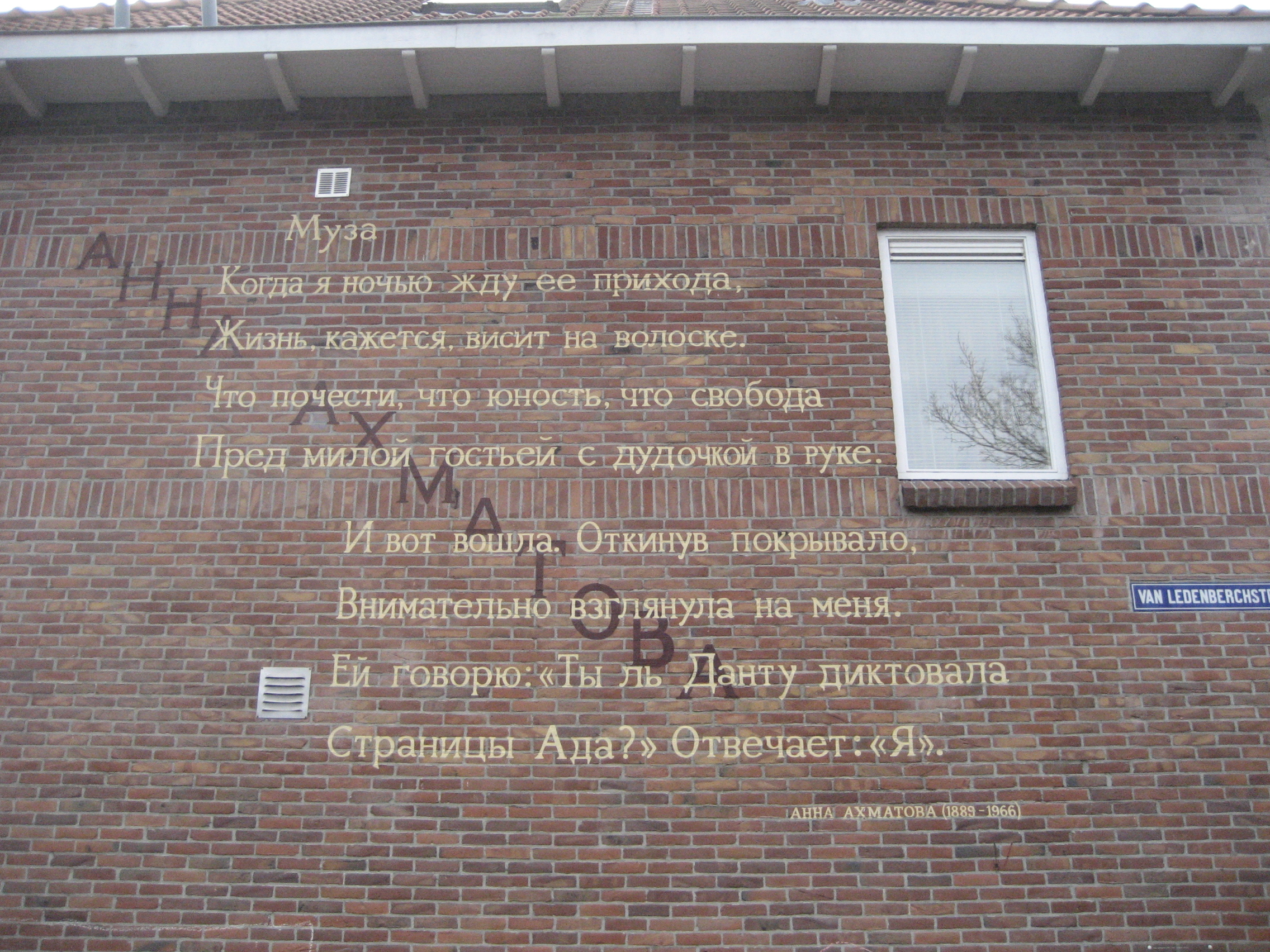
Poem by Akhmatova on a wall in Leiden

Akhmatova joined the Acmeist group of poets in 1910 with poets such as Osip Mandelstam and Sergey Gorodetsky, working in response to the Symbolist school, concurrent with the growth of Imagism in Europe and America. It promoted the use of craft and rigorous poetic form over mysticism or spiritual in-roads to composition, favouring the concrete over the ephemeral. Akhmatova modeled its principles of writing with clarity, simplicity, and disciplined form. Her first collections Evening (1912) and Rosary (1914) received wide critical acclaim and made her famous from the start of her career. They contained brief, psychologically taut pieces, acclaimed for their classical diction, telling details, and the skilful use of colour. Evening and her next four books were mostly lyric miniatures on the theme of love, shot through with sadness.

Her early poems usually picture a man and a woman involved in the most poignant, ambiguous moment of their relationship, much imitated and later parodied by Nabokov and others. Critic Roberta Reeder notes that the early poems always attracted large numbers of admirers: "For Akhmatova was able to capture and convey the vast range of evolving emotions experienced in a love affair, from the first thrill of meeting, to a deepening love contending with hatred, and eventually to violent destructive passion or total indifference. But [...] her poetry marks a radical break with the erudite, ornate style and the mystical representation of love so typical of poets like Alexander Blok and Andrey Bely. Her lyrics are composed of short fragments of simple speech that do not form a logical coherent pattern. Instead, they reflect the way we actually think, the links between the images are emotional, and simple everyday objects are charged with psychological associations. Like Alexander Pushkin, who was her model in many ways, Akhmatova was intent on conveying worlds of meaning through precise details."

Akhmatova often complained that the critics "walled her in" to their perception of her work in the early years of romantic passion, despite major changes of theme in the later years of the Terror. This was mainly due to the secret nature of her work after the public and critical effusion over her first volumes. The risks during the purges were very great. Many of her close friends and family were exiled, imprisoned or shot; her son was under constant threat of arrest, and she was often under close surveillance. Following artistic repression and public condemnation by the state in the 1920s, many within literary and public circles, at home and abroad, thought she had died. Her readership generally did not know her later opus, the railing passion of Requiem or Poem without a Hero and her other scathing works, which were shared only with a very trusted few or circulated in secret by word of mouth (samizdat).

Between 1935 and 1940 Akhmatova composed, worked and reworked the long poem Requiem in secret, a lyrical cycle of lamentation and witness, depicting the suffering of the common people under Soviet terror. She carried it with her as she worked and lived in towns and cities across the Soviet Union. It was conspicuously absent from her collected works, given its explicit condemnation of the purges. The work in Russian finally appeared in book form in Munich in 1963; the whole work not published within USSR until 1987. It consists of ten numbered poems that examine a series of emotional states, exploring suffering, despair, devotion, rather than a clear narrative. Biblical themes such as Christ's crucifixion and the devastation of Mary, Mother of Jesus and Mary Magdalene, reflect the ravaging of Russia, particularly witnessing the harrowing of women in the 1930s. It represented, to some degree, a rejection of her own earlier romantic work as she took on the public role as chronicler of the Terror. This is a role she holds to this day.

Her essays on Pushkin and Poem Without a Hero, her longest work, were only published after her death. This long poem, composed between 1940 and 1965, is often critically regarded as her best work and also one of the finest poems of the twentieth century. It gives a deep and detailed analysis of her epoch and her approach to it, including her important encounter with Isaiah Berlin (1909–97) in 1945. Her talent in composition and translation is evidenced in her fine translations of the works of poets writing in French, English, Italian, Armenian, and Korean.

=== Cultural influence ===
- American composer Ivana Marburger Themmen set Akhmatova's poetry to music.
- Translations of some of her poems by Babette Deutsch and Lyn Coffin are set to music on the 2015 album The Trackless Woods by Iris DeMent.
- Anna Akhmatova is the main character of the Australian play The Woman in the Window by Alma De Groen, premiered at Fairfax Studio, Melbourne, in 1998; Sydney: Currency Press, ISBN 978-0-86819-593-3.
- Dutch composer Marjo Tal set Akhmatova's poetry to music.
- Ukrainian composers Inna Abramovna Zhvanetskaia and Yudif Grigorevna Rozhavskaya set several of Akhmatova's poems to music.
- Porcelain figurine: When Anna Akhmatova was at the peak of her popularity, to commemorate her 35th birthday (1924), a porcelain figurine resembling her in a grey dress with flower pattern covered in a red shawl was mass-produced. Throughout the following years, the figurine was reproduced multiple times on different occasions: once in 1954, on her 65th birthday, as she was fully recognised and praised again following Stalin's death, and again in 1965 as both a tribute to her being short-listed for the Nobel Prize in 1965 and for her 75th birthday a year earlier. This was the last time the porcelain figurine was produced during her lifetime. The figurine was so popular that it was reproduced after her death, once for what would have been her 85th birthday in 1974, and again for her 100th birthday in 1988, making it one of the most popular and widely available porcelain figurines in the USSR. After the collapse of the Soviet Union in 1993, there was an immense surge in Akhmatova's popularity and her porcelain figurine was mass-produced yet again, this time in a plain grey dress with a yellow shawl. Her figure now stands in almost every post-Soviet home.
- Akhmatova appears prominently in Hélène Cixous's play Black Sail White Sail.

== Honours ==
- 1964 – Etna-Taormina prize
- 1965 – honorary doctorate from Oxford University

== Selected poetry collections ==
=== Published by Akhmatova ===
- 1912 – Vecher / Вечер (Evening)
- 1914 – Chetki / Чётки (Rosary or literally Beads)
- 1917 – Belaya Staya / Белая Стая (White Flock) (Note: 1917 – Belaya Staya (White Flock). 2000 copies, 142 pages, published by Hyperborea. See Martin (2007) p. 5.)
- 1921 – Podorozhnik / Подорожник (Wayside Grass/Plantain). 60 pages, 1000 copies published. (Note: 1921 – Podorozhnik (Wayside Grass/Plantain). 60 pages, 1000 copies published. Half the poems are about to or about her husband Shileiko. See Martin (2007) p. 6.)
- 1921 – Anno Domini MCMXXI
- Reed – two-volume collection of selected poems (1924–1926); compiled but never published.
- Uneven – compiled but never published.
- 1940 – From Six Books (publication suspended shortly after release, copies pulped and banned). (Note: 1940 – From Six Books. 327 pages. 10,000 copies intended but publication was suspended shortly after release and copies pulped and remaining issues banned. See Martin (2007) p. 9.)
- 1943 – Izbrannoe Stikhi / Избранные Стишки (Selections of Poetry). Tashkent, government-edited. (Note: 1943 – Izbrannoe Stikhi ("Selections of poetry"). Tashkent, government-issued and edited. 114 pages, 10,000 copies. See Martin (2007) p. 10.)
- Iva / Ива – not separately published (Note: 1965 – Beg vremeni (The Flight of Time: Collected Works 1909–1965). 50,000 copies, 471 pages. The collection draws from seven of her books, including the unpublished volumes Iva and Sed’maya kniga (Seventh Book). See Martin (2007) pp. 12–13.)
- Sed'maya kniga / Седьмая Книга (Seventh Book) – not separately published
- 1958 – Stikhotvoreniya / Стихотворения (Poems) (25,000 copies)
- 1961 – Stikhotvoreniya 1909–1960 / Стихотворения 1909-1960 (Poems: 1909–1960)
- 1965 – Beg vremeni / Бег Времени (The Flight of Time: Collected Works 1909–1965)

=== Later editions ===
- 1967 – Poems of Akhmatova. Ed. and trans. Stanley Kunitz, Boston
- 1976 – Anna Akhmatova: Selected Poems (trans. D. M. Thomas); Penguin Books
- 1985 – Twenty Poems of Anna Akhmatova (trans. Jane Kenyon); Eighties Press and Ally Press; ISBN 0-915408-30-9
- 1988 – Selected Poems (trans. Richard McKane); Bloodaxe Books Ltd; ISBN 1-85224-063-6
- 2000 – The Complete Poems of Anna Akhmatova (trans. Judith Hemschemeyer; ed. Roberta Reeder); Zephyr Press; ISBN 0-939010-27-5
- 2004 – The Word That Causes Death's Defeat: Poems of Memory (Annals of Communism) (trans. Nancy Anderson). Yale University Press. ISBN 0-300-10377-8
- 2006 – Selected Poems (trans. D. M. Thomas); Penguin Classics; ISBN 0-14-042464-4
- 2009 – Selected Poems (trans. Walter Arndt); Overlook TP; ISBN 0-88233-180-9

== See also ==
- Akhmatova's Orphans
- Lidiia Alekseeva, relative and fellow poet

== Sources ==
- Akhmatova, Anna, Trans. Kunitz, Staney and Hayward, Max (1973) Poems of Akhmatova. Houghton Mifflin; ISBN 9780316507004
- Akhmatova, Anna, Trans. Kunitz, Staney and Hayward, Max (1998) Poems of Akhmatova. Houghton Mifflin; ISBN 0-395-86003-2
- Akhmatova, Anna (1989) Trans. Mayhew and Mcnaughton. Poem Without a Hero & Selected Poems. Oberlin College Press; ISBN 0-932440-51-7
- Akhmatova, Anna (1992) Trans. Judith Hemschemeyer The Complete Poems of Anna Akhmatova. Ed. R. Reeder, Boston: Zephyr Press; (2000); ISBN 0-939010-27-5
- Feinstein, Elaine. (2005) Anna of all the Russias: A life of Anna Akhmatova. London: Weidenfeld & Nicolson; ISBN 0-297-64309-6; Alfred A. Knopf, (2006) ISBN 1-4000-4089-2
- Harrington, Alexandra (2006) The poetry of Anna Akhmatova: living in different mirrors. Anthem Press; ISBN 978-1-84331-222-2
- Martin, Eden (2007) Collecting Anna Akhmatova, The Caxtonian, Vol. 4 April 2007 Journal of the Caxton Club; accessed 31 May 2010
- Monas, Sidney; Krupala, Jennifer Greene; Punin, Nikolaĭ Nikolaevich (1999), The Diaries of Nikolay Punin: 1904–1953, Harry Ransom Humanities Research Center Imprint Series, University of Texas Press; ISBN 9780292765894
- Polivanov, Konstantin (1994) Anna Akhmatova and Her Circle, University of Arkansas Press; ISBN 1-557-28309-5
- Reeder, Roberta. (1994) Anna Akhmatova: Poet and Prophet. New York: Picador; ISBN 0-312-13429-0
- Reeder, Roberta. (1997) Anna Akhmatova: The Stalin Years Journal article by Roberta Reeder; New England Review, Vol. 18, 1997
- Wells, David (1996) Anna Akhmatova: Her Poetry Berg Publishers; ISBN 978-1-85973-099-7
