= Vladimir Shileyko =

Russian orientalist and translator

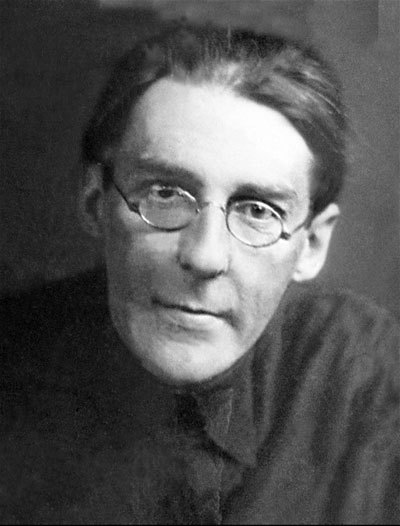
Shileyko in 1928

Vladimir Kazimirovich Shileyko (also Shileiko, Shilejko; Russian: Владимир Казимирович Шилейко; 14 February 1891 – 5 October 1930) was a Russian orientalist (assyriologist, hebraist) poet (acmeist) and translator. The Shileyko family had roots in the Lithuanian part of the Polish–Lithuanian Commonwealth.

He was a second husband of Russian poet Anna Akhmatova.

He is known for his Russian translations of the Epic of Gilgamesh.

He died in Moscow of tuberculosis.
