= Maria Moravskaya =

Russian poet, writer, translator and literary critic

Maria Magdalina Francheska Ludvigovna Moravskaya
- Мари́я Магдали́на Франче́ска Лю́двиговна Мора́вская
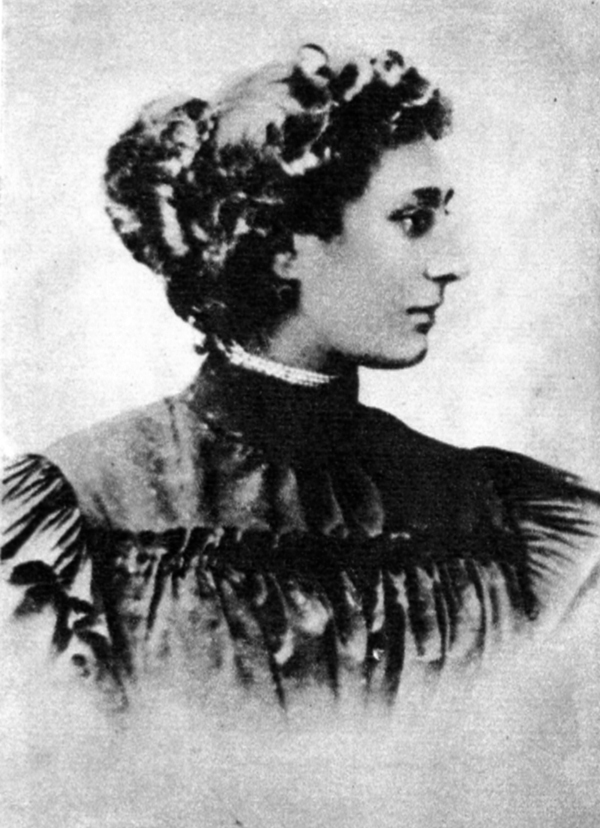
- Moravskaya when she was living in Saint Petersburg
- Born: 12 January 1890; Warsaw
- Died: 26 July 1947 (aged 57); Miami
- Citizenship: Russian Empire, United States
- Occupations: Poet, translator, critic
- Spouses: somebody unknown in Russia (approx. 1906–1907); Edward "Ted" M. Coughlan (approx. 1920s–1940s); unknown Chilean postman (possible 1950s)
- Writing career
- Language: Russian, English

Maria Magdalina Francheska Ludvigovna Moravskaya (or Moravsky; Russian: Мари́я Магдали́на Франче́ска Лю́двиговна Мора́вская; Maria Coughlan in the marriage; 12 January 1890 Warsaw, Russian Empire – 26 June 1947 Miami, US or after 1958 Chile) was a Russian and American poet, writer, translator and literary critic. She wrote several poetical collections and prose works, include works on children literature.

She was ethnic Polish and an active participant in the liberal-democratic movement in Russian Empire in the early 20th century. In 1917 she emigrated from Russia to the US, living and writing in Florida. Information about her last years and death is contradictory: according to some sources, she died in 1947 in Miami, but other sources tell that she died in Chile not earlier than 1958.

== Life ==
=== Early life ===
Maria Moravskaya was born on 12 January 1890 (or 31 December 1889 by the Julian calendar) in Warsaw to a Catholic non-rich Polish family. When she was two years old her mother died. After that Ludvig Moravskiy, her father, married the sister of his deceased spouse. Then the Moravskaya family moved to Odessa.

Moravskaya thought well of her father and described him as a good and dreamy man. She also thought well of her younger stepbrothers and stepsisters. But when Maria was 15 years old she was forced to leave home due to a conflict with her stepmother. Sometime later she moved from Odessa to Saint Petersburg where she worked as a secretary, private tutor and translator. At that time she started her literary activity and had significant financial difficulties. She joined the Bestuzhev Courses but did not graduate from it.

From her early years, Moravskaya had an active civic stand and took part in the activity of different political circles. Initially, she was a supporter of self-determination of Poland. At the beginning of the Revolution of 1905 she identified herself as a socialist. In 1906 and 1907 she had been arrested twice and detained for short times in transit prisons.

There are data about her early and brief marriage which Moravskaya thought to be an "occasional".

=== Saint Petersburg ===
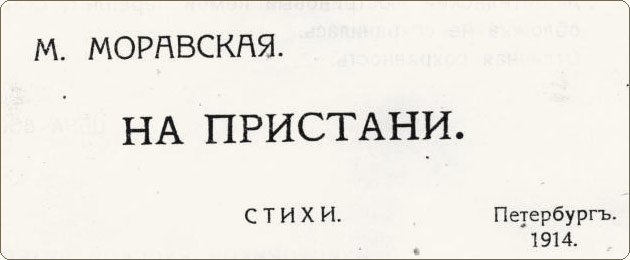
Title of first published book of poems by Moravskaya

In Saint Petersburg Moravskaya joined the literary circles fast enough, mostly due to the patronage of Maximilian Voloshin who she dated in January 1910. She also had the support of Zinaida Gippius. In 1911 Moravskaya began visiting "Literature Wednesdays" (Сре́ды) by Vyacheslav Ivanov and "Academy of Poem" (Академия стиха) also founded by Ivanov. In 1911 she was also accepted into "The Guild of Poets" (Цех поэтов) just after its founding by Nikolay Gumilyov and Sergey Gorodetsky. Moravskaya became a frequenter of Petersburg bohemia meetings at the Stray Dog Café.

She had accepted the events of World War I, partially bitter combat operations and disasters that affected civilian people in her native Poland, quite emotionally. Her friend Ilya Ehrenburg wrote "Слышишь, как воет волчиха" (Do you hear howl of she-wolf?).

=== Emigration ===
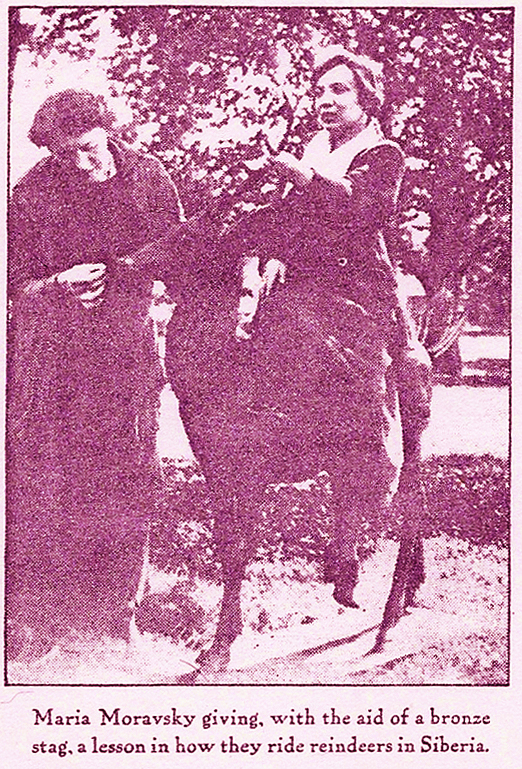
Maria Moravsky on horseback.

In 1917 Moravskaya took a trip to Japan. From Japan she travelled to Latin America and then she moved to the US. In accordance with her memories, the motives for immigration to the United States were an idealized idea about the country and her aspiration for a "mix of typical Russian and typical American to make a new, gentle, judicious and harmonious creature". (Note: Original Russian quote: перемешать типичного русского и типичного американца, чтобы создать новое, нежное, благоразумное, гармоничное существо) Later, the new country had disappointed Moravskaya by spiritual impoverishment of society, manifestations of racism and low level of political freedoms, and she had been declaring against this in the local mass media. For example, in one of her first English-language articles named "Your Newspapers and Ours" she proved that American journalists in the peaceful year of 1919 have lesser freedom of expression than their Russian colleagues under tsar Nicholas II even in war conditions. Ten years later, in 1946 Moravskaya had written a letter to Ehrenburg and she acknowledged her nostalgia for Russia and her doubts about whether her creative work was needed in the US: Я, Мария Моравская, была поэтом в России, а теперь почти разучилась говорить по-русски. Пишу исключительно по-английски… Живешь, как мертвая, мертвая для поэзии, потому что тут ведь стихов писать не стоит… (I, Maria Moravskaya, was a poet in Russia and now I has almost forgotten how to speak Russian. I write in English solely... and live as dead, as dead for poetry because it is not worth to write poems here...")

Despite a certain disappointment with American life, Moravskaya practically broke all contacts with Russia and successfully adapted to life in the US soon; she learned English in eight months. Firstly she had been settled in New York where she was engaged in journalistic work at one newspaper. That paper would have closed soon but Moravskaya could establish partnerships with many other periodical media.

Moravskaya stayed in New York for at least up to the early 1920s. There she married Edward "Ted" M. Coughlan, a detective fiction writer who had immigrated to the US from Dominion of Newfoundland. Moravskaya accepted her husband's surname and became Maria Coughlan but still used her maiden name for most of her publications. Because of this, she is mostly known as Maria Moravsky and not Maria Coughlan.

In the early 1930s, Edward and Maria moved to Lakeland, Florida and then to Miami in 1932. They lived in a dwelling called by them Fiction Farm at a southern part of Miami. Moravskaya was known not only as a prolific writer and publicist and a member of the local Soma Club but also as a woman of an active lifestyle and many hobbies, including exotic. For example, she was engaged in the selection of new breeds of lovebird and domestic duck, training of wild animals and growing of extrinsic plants, printing of books with home-made equipment. Moravsky was travelling in South America where she was rafting rivers in canoe.

There is contradictory information about the time and place of her death. Many sources tell that Moravskaya died in Miami on 26 June 1947 and some of them tell that poet had perished from storm. But we also have enough proven information about her living in Chile the late 1950s at least. There is evidence by Korney Chukovsky who, in the first half of 1960s, told Margarita Aliger that he had received a letter from Moravskaya several years before. By his words, in Chile Maria Moravskaya had married local postman: "Несколько лет назад я получил от неё письмо из Чили. Судьба забросила её туда, она вышла замуж за почтальона и с ним доживает свой век. Как было бы интересно вам её повстречать. Представляете – рафинированная петербургская барышня, поэтесса, подруга поэтов, завсегдатай "Бродячей собаки", и вот какой финал – супруга чилийского почтальона!" ("Several years ago I received her letter from Chile. Fate brought her there, she married a postman and lives out her days with him. How interesting it would be if you meet her. Just imagine: a refined Petersburg lady, a poetess, a friend of poets, a frequenter of Stray Dog Café… and a wife of Chilean postman – what's finale!"). Pavel Luknitskiy confirms this too; at "The list of names" published in his book named "Acumiana. Встречи с Анной Ахматовой" 1889 – 1958 stated as years of life of Moravskaya, who was "a poetess and member of the first Guild of poets".

== Creative work ==
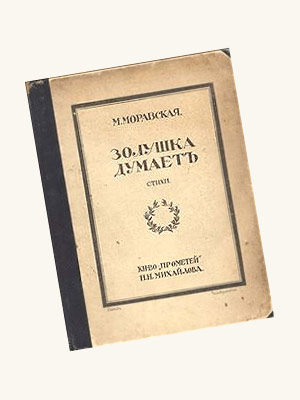
Title of first edition of collection "Золушка думает" (Cinderella is thinking)

When Maria Moravskaya was 16 years old and she lived in Odessa, she published her first poem. Then he had several publications in the newspapers of Odessa.

At Saint Petersburg first publication of her poems was at Hyperborean (Гиперборей) and Zavety (Заветы) magazines. In 1911 Moravskaya had begun systematic collaboration with Appolon magazine, firstly as reviewer and translator. She translated works of Polish, Czech and Finnish writers. Then she made her own poems and essays for magazine. Later her works was published in Vestnik Evropy, Russkaya Mysl, Sovremenny Mir and Ezhemesyachniy Zhurnal magazines and almanacs.

The first published works by Moravskaya earned positive reviews from literary figures such as Vladislav Khodasevich, Igor Severyanin, Sasha Chorny. Anna Akhmatova, whose poems critics compared with Moravskaya's poems, had recognized her as a "fellow-worker" (Note: Original Russian quote: товарищ по цеху) and later several times gifts her own books to her. Gippius in her letter to Chukovsky described Moravskaya as "extremely talented person". And Maria Moravskaya was getting especial support from Voloshin who was of a high opinion about her creative perspectives and predicting role of "second Cherubina de Gabriak". And Cherubina herself (her real name is Elisaveta Dmitrieva) recognized young Polish as her creative successor and 18 January 1910 she wrote to Voloshin:

Russian

Я ещё не получила письма от Моравской – очень хочу её видеть, я прочла несколько её стихов Маковскому, он в восторге, хочет её печатать; так что это уже её дело.

Аморя, по-моему, ей ничего не даст, ей нужен возврат в католичество, или через него. Диксу её стихи не понравились.

А у меня чувство – что я умерла, и Моравская пришла ко мне на смену, как раз около 15-го, когда Черубина должна была постричься. Мне холодно и мёртво от этого. А от Моравской огромная радость!

English
I do not receive a letter from Moravskaya – and I want to see her very much, I have been reading for Makovsky several of her poems and he is in raptures over it and want to publish it; so this is her business.

In my opinion, Amorya gives her nothing and she needs for return to Catholicism or through it. Diks doesn't like her poems.

And I feel that I had died, and Moravskaya had come up to take my place just about 15th when Cherubina had had to profess. (Note: In accordance with legend, poetess Cherubina de Gabriak had to disappear and supposedly make a nun. Sergey Makovsky was a poet, arts critic and founder of Appolon magazine. "Amorya" was a home nickname of Margarita Voloshina. "Diks" was a pen name of poet, critic and teacher B. A. Leman.) I feel myself cold and dead from this. But I feel great joy from Moravskaya!

In early 1914, the first almanac of poems by Moravskaya named "На пристани" (On the Pier) had been issued. Expert in literature Razumnik Ivanov-Razumnik, several months before the publication of this almanac, had sent a draft of it to his authoritative colleagues including Andrei Bely and Valery Bryusov. The last by Razumnik's request had written a preface named "Объективность и субъективность в поэзии" (The Objectivity and The Subjectivity in Poetry) for Maravskaya's almanac. But that preface remained unpublished as Moravskaya insisted on; she wrote to Bryusov:

Russian	English
Очень благодарю Вас за то, что Вы написали о моих стихах, но в самом существенном я, к моему большому огорчению, не могу с Вами согласиться… Стремлюсь уйти не от действительности вообще, а лишь от окружающей меня вялой и блеклой действительности. Книги для меня только паллиатив иной, более насыщенной жизни. "Выдумывать" себе душу я считаю для поэта преступным. "События" ставлю, разумеется, выше моих мимолетных чувствований. Таким образом, Ваше мнение, что я – поэт узколичный, с моей точки зрения – обвинительный приговор для книжки, а потому мне с крайним сожалением приходится отказаться от Вашего в общем чрезвычайно ценного для меня предисловия...	Thank you very much for what you has written about my poems, but to my deep regret I can't agree with you in the most essential... I try to escape not from reality on the whole but just from sluggish and faded reality which surrounding me. Books for me is only palliative of other, eventful life. I think it's a crime for poet to "concoct" one's soul. Of course, I set "events" over my fleeting sensations. Thereby your opinion that I is a narrowly private poet – in the view of mine, that is a guilty verdict for a book and that's why I have to refuse your preface, which in general is very valuable for me, with extreme regret.

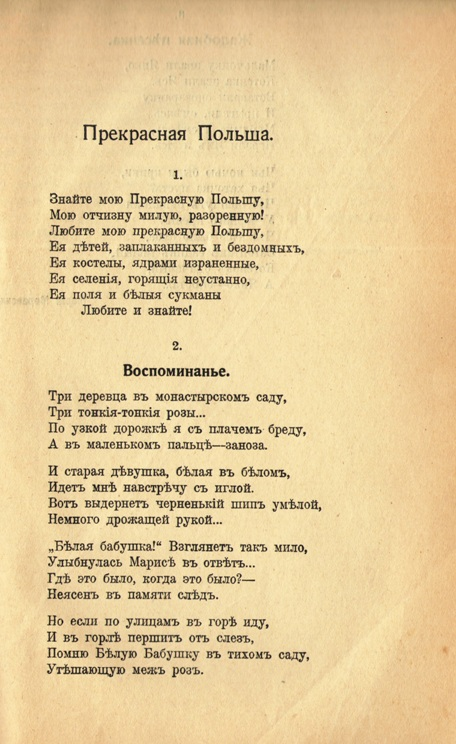
Circle of poems "Прекрасная Польша" (The Beautiful Poland) had been issued in Russkaya Mysl

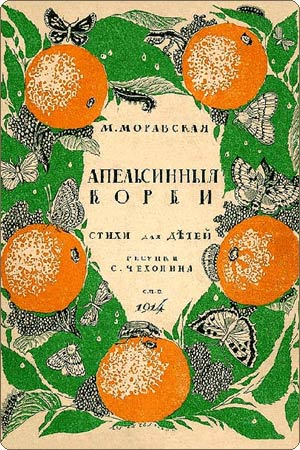
First edition of ″Orange peel″ illustrated by S. V. Chehonin (С. В. Чехониным)

As a result, "На пристани" rose a keen but varied response from critics. They noted a common motif of the most of works included in almanac: yearning for journeys and far exotic countries. “Capricious” and “infantile” style of poem had been noticed (Moravskaya herself considered her own style as a “doll style”). Sophia Parnok noted that the main message of Morvskaya's lyric poetry is a "self-pity". Alexandra Kublitskaya-Piottuh had given a negative review and her son Alexander Blok had agreed with mother despite that his positive consideration of Moravskaya's poetry at the whole:

Russian	English
По-моему, это не поэзия. Но тут есть своеобразное. Очень искренно выказан кусок себялюбивой мелкой души. Может быть, Брюсов и А. Белый думают, что стремление на юг, в котором состоит почти всё содержание – это тоска трёх сестёр и вообще по Земле Обетованной. Они ошибаются. Это просто желание попасть в тёплые страны, в Крым, на солнышко. Если бы было иначе, в стихах бы чувствовалась весна, чего абсолютно нет. Да и вообще ни весны, ни осени, ни зимы, никакого лиризма… Это только у женщин такая способность писать необычайно лёгкие стихи без поэзии и без музыки...	I think this is not a poetry. But here is something peculiar. The piece of self-loving petty spirit is told very frankly. May Bryusov and A. Bely think that aspiration for the south (it's almost all content) is a melancholy of three sisters and, in general, nostalgia for the Promised Land. They are mistaken. It's a simple desire for travelling to the warm countries, to Crimea, to the bright sun. If it were otherwise spring would be felt in poems which is absolutely no. There is no spring nor autumn nor winter nor any lyricism at all... Only women have this possibility to write immensely lightweight poems without poetry and music...

Her novel The Bird of Fire: A Tale of Russia in Revolution was published in the USA in 1927.
