= Georgy Adamovich =

Russian poet, literary critic, translator and memoirist

- Георгий Адамович
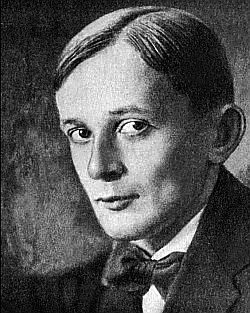
- Adamovich in the early 1920s
- Born: 19 April 1892; Moscow, Russian Empire
- Died: 21 February 1972 (aged 79); Nice, France
- Education: Saint Petersburg State University
- Occupations: Poet; translator; literary critic
- Writing career
- Period: 1916–1972
- Genres: Poetry; critical essay; philosophical essay
- Movement: Acmeism

Georgy Viktorovich Adamovich (Russian: Георгий Викторович Адамович, IPA: [ɡʲɪˈorɡʲɪj ˈvʲiktərəvʲɪtɕ ɐdɐˈmovʲɪtɕ]; 19 April [O.S. 7 April] 1892 – 21 February 1972) was a Russian poet of the acmeist school, and a literary critic, translator and memoirist. He also lectured on Russian literature at universities in the United States and the United Kingdom.

== Early life ==
Georgy Adamovich was born into the family of senior military officer Viktor Adamovich, an ethnic Pole, who served as head of the Moscow military hospital with the rank of major general. Georgy spent the first nine years of his life in Moscow. "We were a military family; two of my brothers were army officers. My dad said of me, if the family legend is to be believed: "This boy's got nothing officer-like in him- let him be a civilian. And so it was to be," Adamovich later remembered. After his father's death the family moved to Saint Petersburg where Georgy joined the First Gymnasium. In 1910 he became a student at Saint Petersburg State University. He started writing poetry there and in 1915 became a member of the Acmeist circle.

== Career ==
Adamovich's debut short story "Merry Horses" (Весёлые кони) was published in 1915 in the journal Voice of Life, edited by Dmitry Filosofov and Zinaida Gippius. By 1917 he was a member (later one of the two leaders, along with Georgy Ivanov) of the Saint Petersburg Poet's Workshop. Adamovich's first collection of poetry Clouds (Облака) was praised by Nikolai Gumilyov for "class and good taste." His second book of poetry, Purgatory (Чистилище, 1922) began with a tribute to Gumilyov whom the young poet now regarded as his mentor. Gumilyov's fellow Acmeist, Anna Akhmatova frequently visited Adamovich's sister Tanya at their home. Adamovich often met Akhmatova at the Saint Petersburg nightclub "The Stray Dog" (Бродячая Собака), a place where artists and writers would gather to discuss art and literature, socialize, or listen to the recitation of new poems by Akhmatova and other poets including Konstantin Balmont, Sergei Yesenin, and Igor Severyanin. Adamovich graduated from the Faculty of History and Philology at Saint Petersburg State University in 1917.

After the 1917 Revolution Adamovich worked for The World Literature publishing house (founded by Maxim Gorky in 1919), translating the works of Charles Baudelaire, Voltaire, José-Maria de Heredia, Lord Byron and Thomas Moore. In 1921-22 he attended the literary gatherings and poetry meetings held at The House of Art (Дом искусств), formerly the mansion of a wealthy Saint Petersburg merchant. In 1923 he went to Berlin, then settled in France to 'join the anti-Soviet circles' (as the Soviet Literary Encyclopaedia noted in 1934). Here he soon made a name for himself as a literary critic and essayist, working for Zveno (The Link) magazine and Poslednye Novosty (The Latest News). In the thirties Adamovich was widely regarded as 'the leading Russian literary critic abroad', working for such magazines as Tchisla (Numbers) and Vstrechi (Meetings), of which he was the editor for a time. He almost stopped writing poetry and yet is credited as a major force behind the Paris Note (Парижская Нота), a school of Russian poetry in exile holding for its main principles "total sincerity in depicting the anguish of the human soul" and "demonstrating the naked truth". Georgy Fedotov called Adamovich, with his 'truth-seeking' paradigm, an 'ascetic wanderer'. In 1939 Adamovich's book of poetry In the West (На Западе) was published. Later its title was used by the poet and literary scholar Yuri Ivask who in 1953 compiled and edited an anthology of Russian emigrant poetry (in which Adamovich was well represented).

== Later life ==
The Autumn of 1939 saw Adamovich fighting the Nazis as a volunteer in the French army. He was interned after the army's defeat. During the late 1940s, Adamovich went through a brief period of 'enchantment' with the USSR and Joseph Stalin in particular; he thought that the great victory in the World War II could trigger some kind of political reform or renovation process in the USSR. Adamovich contributed to several pro-Soviet western papers and published a book entitled The Other Motherland (Другая родина, 1947). Written in French, it was seen by some Russian emigres as "an act of capitulation before Stalinism." In the years to come, though, Adamovich became increasingly more disillusioned. These feelings were reflected to some extent in his 1955 collection of essays called Loneliness and Freedom (Одиночество и свобода).

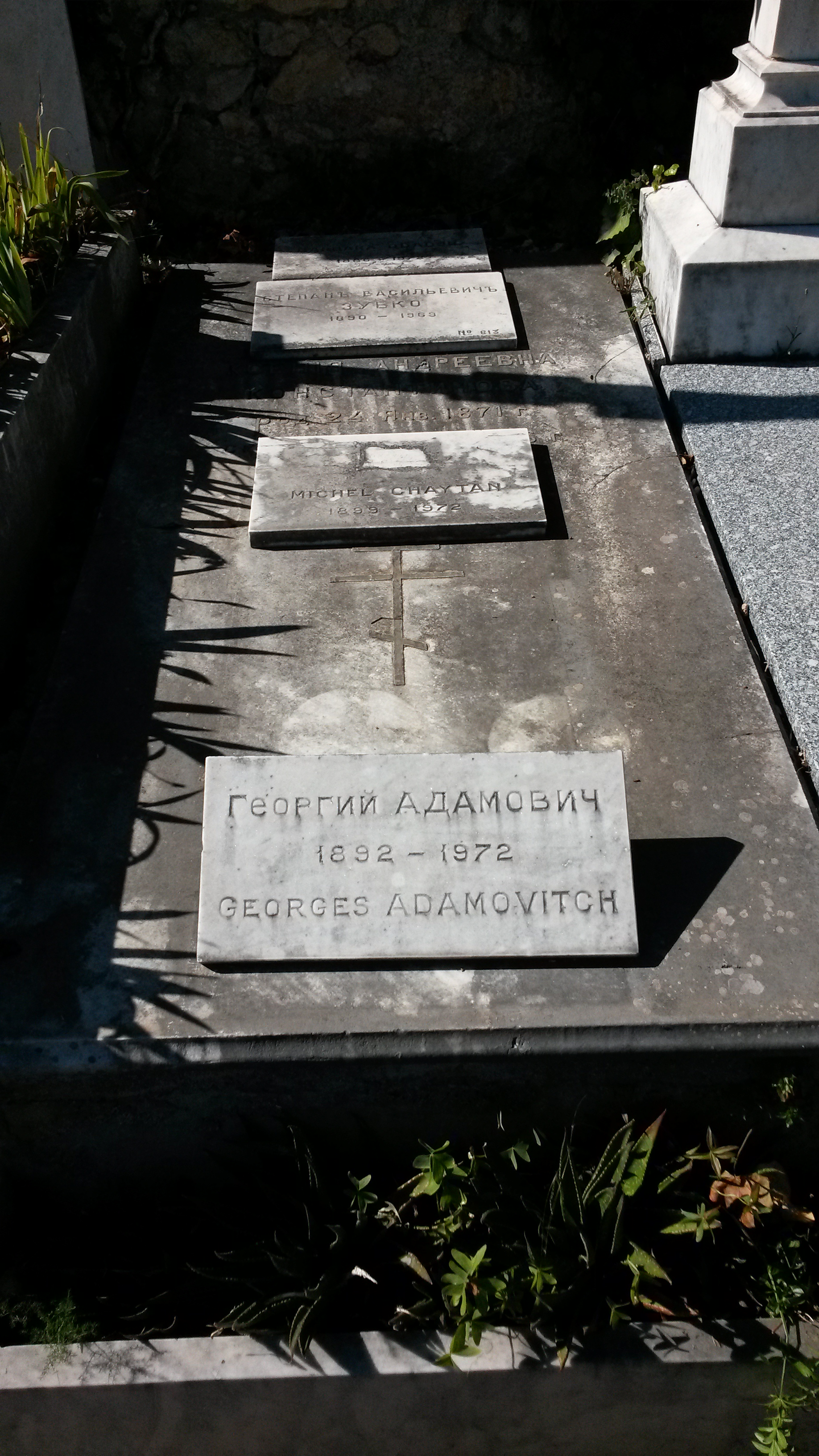
His grave in Nice.

Adamovich continued to translate French literature into Russian including the works of Jean Cocteau, Saint-John Perse and Albert Camus (The Stranger). He lectured on Russian literature at the University of Manchester from 1950 to 1960, and for one semester (1960–61) at the University of Oxford. In 1971 he travelled to the United States, lecturing at Harvard University, Yale University, and New York University. In 1967 his last book of poetry Unity (Единство) was published. It coincided with the release of Comments (Комментарии), a vast collection of critical essays. Georgy Adamovich died on February 21, 1972, in Nice, France.

== Career as a critic ==
Adamovich was one of the most important emigre critics. His main critical stance centered on simplicity. He rejected experimental poetry and recommended eschatological subject matter such as truth, loneliness, suffering, and death. He admired the works of Alexander Pushkin, Mikhail Lermontov, Alexander Blok, and Leo Tolstoy (although he did not like Tolstoy's moral preaching). He disliked Afanasy Fet and Anton Chekhov (especially his plays), whose portrayals of the dullness and mediocrity of everyday life obscured, in Adamovich's opinion, the questions of eternal significance.

Adamovich saw Fyodor Dostoyevsky as a dangerous metaphysical writer, and disapproved of Marina Tsvetaeva's "loudness" and her experimentation in rhythm, meter, and rhyme. He severely criticised Boris Pasternak's poems from Doctor Zhivago. His sceptical views of poetry and writing resembled those of his fellow critic Mark Aldanov. Adamovich was highly appreciative of the musical qualities of Blok's poems and those of Georgy Ivanov. He expressed these views in his meetings with younger poets, and in his critical essays.

== Personal life ==
Adamovich was gay. Vladimir Nabokov disparagingly referred to him as "Sodomovich."

== English translations ==
- Poems and "The Impossibility of Poetry" (essay), from A Russian Cultural Revival, University of Tennessee Press, 1981. ISBN 0-87049-296-9
