= Irina Odoyevtseva =

Russian poet, novelist and memoirist

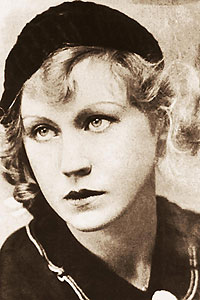
- Born: Iraida Heinike; 15 June 1895; Riga, Russian Empire
- Died: 14 October 1990 (aged 95); Leningrad, Soviet Union
- Occupations: poet, novelist, memoirist
- Spouse: Georgy Ivanov
- Writing career
- Literary movement: Acmeism

Iraida Heinike (15 June 1895 or 1901 – 14 October 1990), known by the pen name Irina Vladimirovna Odoyevtseva (Note: The name (which has also been spelled Odoevtseva, Odoevceva or Odoevzev) can be translated as "Irene of the odes", referring to the genre of lyric poetry. The first name Irene stems from the Greek word εἰρήνη eirḗnē meaning "peace"; and the middle name Vladimirovna can be understood to refer as well to peace, since it includes the Russian word мир mir "peace" (however, the name more probably has a different etymology and means "great is his power".) (Russian: Ирина Владимировна Одоевцева, IPA: [ɪˈrʲinə vlɐˈdʲimʲɪrəvnə ɐˈdojɪftsɨvə]) was a Russian poet, novelist and memoirist, and the wife of the poet Georgy Ivanov.

== Biography ==
Iraida Heinike was born in Riga, now the capital of the Republic of Latvia but then in the Russian Empire. Her father Gustav Heinike was a Baltic German lawyer. In 1918 she moved to St. Petersburg (then in the throes of revolution and recently rebaptized Petrograd), and adopted the pen name Irina Odoyevtseva. She joined the Second Guild of Poets, was tutored by Nikolai Gumilyov, whom she "worshipped", and become his favorite student. According to Yevgeny Yevtushenko, she "enchanted everybody, her teacher included, with her brilliant, masterful poetry" and had tremendous success with her debut book Dvor Tchudes (Russian: Двор чудес, The Court of Wonders, 1922), "half-starved bohemia [of Petrograd] learning her 'Cabman' (Russian: Извозчик) and 'The Ballad of Crushed Glass' (Russian: Балладу о толченом стекле) poems by heart." Formally an acmeist, Odoevtseva developed her own distinctive style and was in many ways ahead of her times, anticipating the latter experiments of oberiuts and even 1960s Soviet conceptualists. Her trademark was a distinctive speech impediment (she couldn't pronounce her "r"'s), which she mentioned a number of times in her later autobiographies "On the Banks of Neva" and "On the Banks of Seine".

In 1921 she married the poet Georgy Ivanov, a prominent acmeist. In 1922 the couple emigrated to Paris. There she wrote several novels which enjoyed good sales and were translated into other languages (Angel of Death, 1927; Isolde, 1931; Abandon All Hope, 1948); but she was more successful in later life with her memoirs, On the Banks of Neva (1967) and On the Banks of Seine (1983), with their many personal anecdotes about the famous artists she had known: Nikolai Gumilyov, Georgy Ivanov, Osip Mandelstam, Zinaida Gippius, Dmitri Merezhkovsky, Andrey Bely and Ivan Bunin among others. These two books caused much controversy among the Russians in France but still "might be regarded as a priceless document of the time, even if full of aberrations and frivolous twists of fantasy," according to poet and Russian poetry historian Yevgeny Yevtushenko.

Her marriage to Georgy Ivanov, though it lasted 37 years, "had little to do with the usual concepts of conjugal life," according to her biographer Ella Bobrova. An example of their wild life can be found in the papers of the French writer Georges Bataille: "In December 1937 [...] Laure and myself prepared a dinner: we were expecting Ivanov and Odoyevtseva. Just as we had planned, the dinner proved no less wild than the wind blowing that day. Odoevtseva, naked, began to vomit."

During the Second World War, the couple joined the exodus from Paris and lived in a villa in the coastal resort town of Biarritz, which they had bought in 1932 when Odoyevtseva received an inheritance upon her father's death. The town was occupied by German troops in the summer of 1940. In 1943 their house was requisitioned by the German army, but they remained in Biarritz until 1946. Their house had been looted and later destroyed by American bombing. But the Ivanovs' social position during the war years would later lead to Georgy being charged with Nazi sympathies, particularly by his former friend Georgy Adamovich.

After the War, Ivanov and Odoyevtseva moved back to Paris, but their flat had been looted. They were both excluded from the literary world, which was now dominated by Communists and where their alleged Nazi sympathies earned them ostracism. They lived in more or less desperate poverty, and Ivanov sank into alcoholism. In the early 1950s Ivanov had to move into an assisted living environment. He managed to get into the "Russian House" in Juan-les-Pins in the south of France, a subsidized home for destitute immigrants; then in the winter of 1953 he moved into a government shelter for the elderly in Hyères, also on the southern coast. He died in Hyères in 1958.

Twenty years after Ivanov's death Odoevtseva married another émigré writer, Jacques Gorbof (born Yakov Gorbov), whose work she had translated in the 1950s. She lived with him until his death in 1981.

In 1987, taking advantage of the relaxation of border restrictions, Odoyevtseva returned to Leningrad. She enjoyed a warm public welcome there, and for a couple of years, as Yevtushenko puts it, "was transported from one concert stage to another as a kind of a talking relic and was, indeed, talking a lot — in the most gracious manner, at that." A popular figure on Russian TV during the Perestroika period, Odoyevtseva enjoyed some commercial success too, having 200,000 copies of her memoirs sold — a figure far surpassing whatever she might have sold through her 65 years abroad. She died in Leningrad three years later.

== Works in English translation ==
- Irina Odoevtzeva [sic], Out of Childhood (original title: Angel' smerti), London: Constable, 1930
- Isolde (original title: Izol'da), tr. Bryan Karetnyk and Irina Steinberg, London: Pushkin Press, 2019
