= Kantemirovsky Bridge =

Kantemirovsky Bridge Кантемировский мост
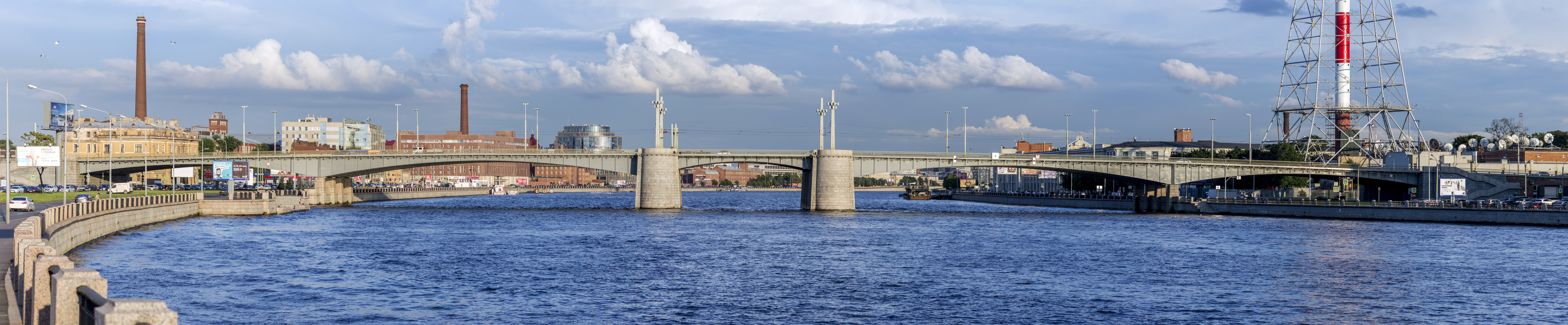
- Coordinates: 59°58′43″N 30°19′19″E
- Carries: Motor vehicles, trolleybuses, pedestrians
- Crosses: Bolshaya Nevka River
- Locale: Saint Petersburg, Russia
- Named for: Kantemirovskaya Street (Saint Petersburg)
- Maintained by: Mostotrest Saint Petersburg bridge maintenance trust
- Website: en.mostotrest-spb.ru/bridges/kantemirovskij
- Preceded by: Rowing boat link
- Next downstream: Ushakovsky Bridge

Characteristics
- Design: Bascule bridge
- Material: Steel, concrete, granite, asphalt
- Total length: 664 m (2,178 ft)
- Width: 32.3 m (106 ft)
- Longest span: 43 m (141 ft)
- No. of spans: 15

History
- Architect: V. M. Ivanov & A. V. Govorkovsky
- Designer: Lengiproinzhproject institute
- Engineering design by: B. N. Brudno & B. B. Levin
- Construction start: 1979
- Inaugurated: 1982

Location
- Interactive map of Kantemirovsky Bridge

Kantemirovskiy Bridge (Russian: Кантемировский мост) is a large modern (built in 1979 - early 1980s) drawbridge (bascule bridge) in Saint Petersburg, Russia across the Bolshaya Nevka arm of the Neva river. The bridge connects the northern Aptekarsky Island (Apothecary Island) of the north-central Petrogradsky District on Petrograd Side with northeastern Vyborgskiy District of the city and over it with the northeast and east of Saint Petersburg. It receives automobile traffic from Bolshoy Prospekt (Petrograd Side) via Prospekt Medikov in the southwest and takes it to Kantemirovskaya Street on the right-hand riverside, after which it was named. The street itself was named in 1952 after the railway station of a settlement of Kantemirovka in Voronezh region which was liberated from Nazi Germany troops by the Soviet Red Army in December 1942. The settlement in its turn was named after its 18 century owner Dimitrie Cantemir and his brother Constantin, Moldavian princes given shelter in Russia after a military defeat and entered into Russian nobility.

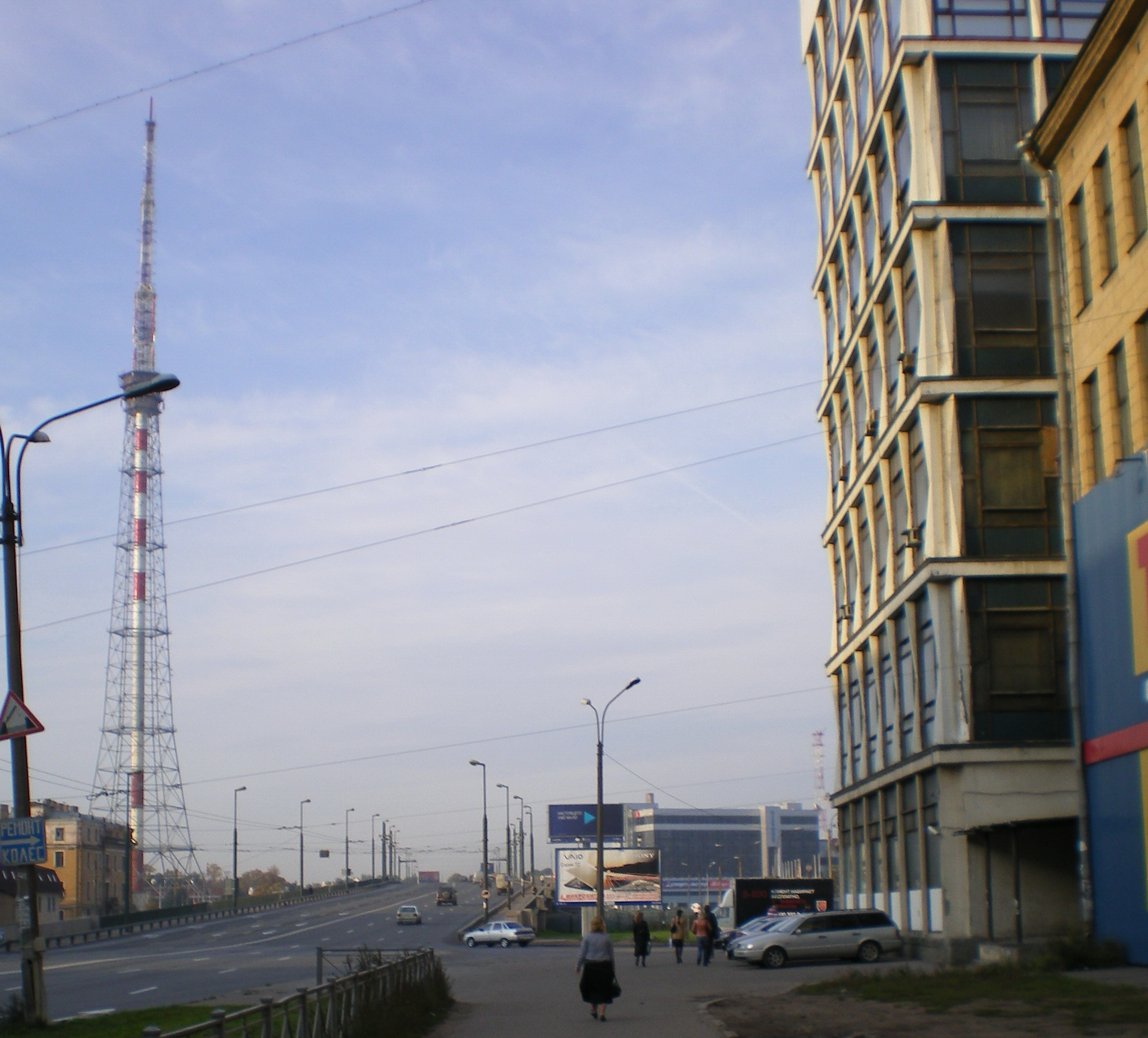
The bridge entrance from the east Vyborg Side with the Saint Petersburg Television Tower on the opposite side of the Greater Nevka on Aptekarsky Island and office buildings on the right

== History ==
It was built in 1979-82 as a part of a citywide thoroughfare street chain project at a place without a previous bridge:

Previously, there was no bridge link here. The need to build a new bridge arose because of the construction of an internal transport highway in the city, which starts from Tsiolkovsky Street, runs along the northern side of the Obvodny Canal with access to Alexander Nevsky Bridge and then along Zanevsky Prospect to the bridge across the Okhta River in the alignment of Energetikov Avenue, then along Annikov Avenue to Kantemirovskaya Street, in the alignment of which Kantemirovsky Bridge is located, and then across Aptekarsky Island to the Petrograd Side to the area of Kamennoostrovsky Bridge.

— Committee for the development of transport infrastructure of St. Petersburg City Administration, Кантемировский мост, Kantemirovskiy bridge. Website of Committee for the development of transport infrastructure of St. Petersburg

There used to be a boat connection in its place since early 19 century.

== See also ==
- List of bridges in Saint Petersburg

== Reading ==
- Бунин М. С. (1986). Мосты Ленинграда. Очерки истории и архитектуры мостов Петербурга — Петрограда — Ленинграда. Л.: Стройиздат.
- Горбачевич К. С., Хабло Е. П. (1996). Почему так названы?. p. 103.
- Sindalovskiy, Naum (1997). Городские имена сегодня и вчера. p. 54.
- Новиков Ю. В. (1991). Мосты и набережные Ленинграда. Л.: Лениздат. Сост. П. П. Степнов
