= Chyornaya Rechka (Saint Petersburg) =

River in Saint Petersburg, Russia

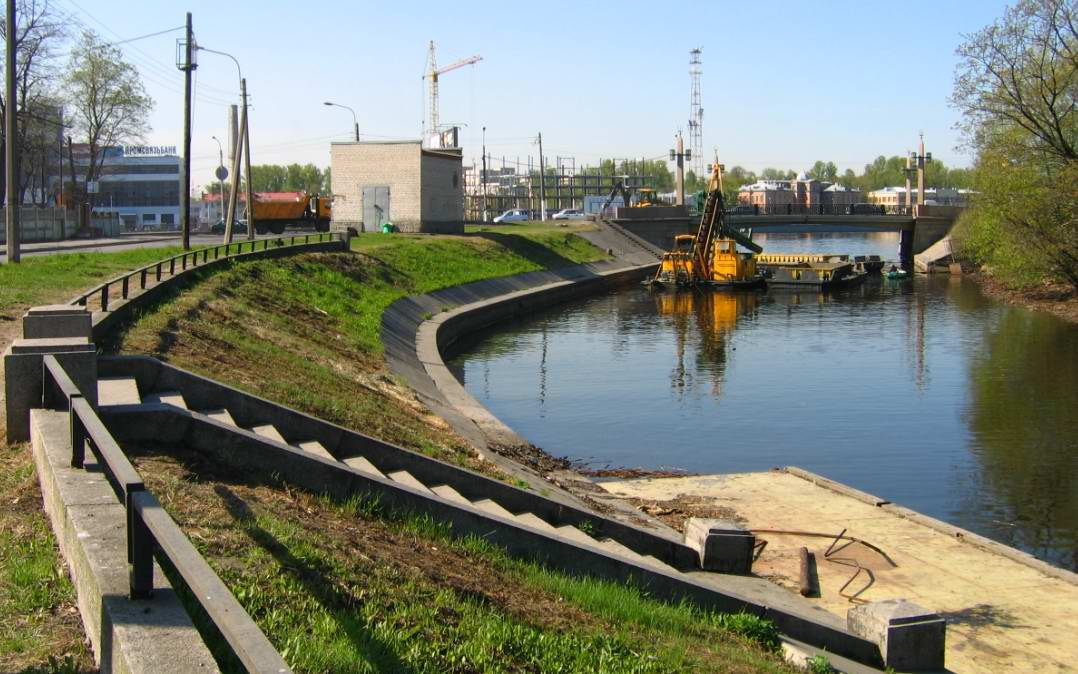

Location
- Country: Russia

Physical characteristics
- Mouth: Great Nevka
  - coordinates: 59.9793°N 30.3146°E
- Length: 8.1 km (5.0 mi)

Basin features
- Progression: Great Nevka→ Gulf of Finland

The Chyornaya Rechka (Russian: Чёрная речка, lit. 'Little Black River') is a small river in Saint Petersburg. It is 8.1 kilometres long, and flows into the Great Nevka, a branch of the Neva.

The Chyornaya Rechka is known for famous duels that took place there, including the 1909 duel between Nikolai Gumilyov and Maximilian Voloshin over the matter of a fictitious poet called Cherubina de Gabriak [in the Finnish language: Kaprijakin (Kaprion) Kerubitar], and the fatal duel between poet-playwright Alexander Pushkin and Georges d'Anthès. The Chyornaya Rechka contributes to St. Petersburg's weather – since water absorbs and radiates heat slower than land it makes temperatures less extreme in a place so close to the polar zone.
