= Mary Custis Vezey =

American poet

- Mariia Genrikhovna Vizi
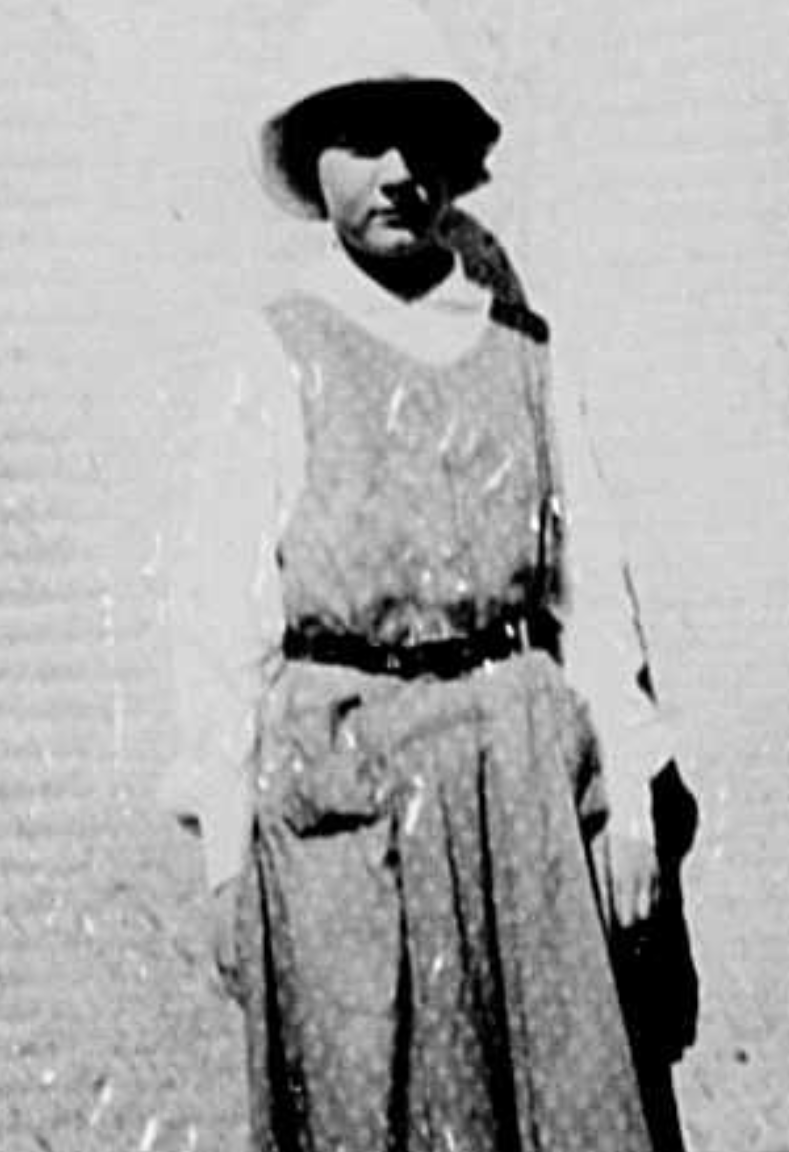
- Mary Custis Vezey aged fifteen
- Born: January 17, 1904; New York City, US
- Died: October 18, 1994 (aged 90); San Francisco, US
- Education: Pomona College
- Occupations: Poet, translator
- Spouse: Evgenii Fedorovich Tourkoff
- Children: 1

Mary Custis Vezey (or Maria Genrikhovna Vezey in Russian; Russian: Мария Генриховна Визи January 17, 1904 – October 18, 1994) was an American poet and translator who published in English and Russian, leaving "a fine heritage of published and unpublished works".

== Life ==
Mary Custis Vezey was born on January 17, 1904, in New York to a Russian mother, Mariia Platonovna Travlinskaia (1874–1950), and an American father, Henry Custis Vezey (1873–1939). She grew up in Saint Petersburg, Russia, where the family moved when she was four weeks old, and Harbin, China, where her father was transferred in 1917 to work at the American Consulate. The family formed part of the Russian diaspora in China, where many Russians had fled following the 1917 revolution and civil war. From the early 1920s, Henry Custis Vezey edited and published an English-Russian newspaper in Harbin, the Russian Daily News, which was later renamed Harbin Daily News. Mary Vezey started to write poetry at the age of six, initially in Russian. She admired the work of Alexander Pushkin, Mikhail Lermontov, Alexander Blok, Nikolai Gumilev, and Anna Akhmatova.

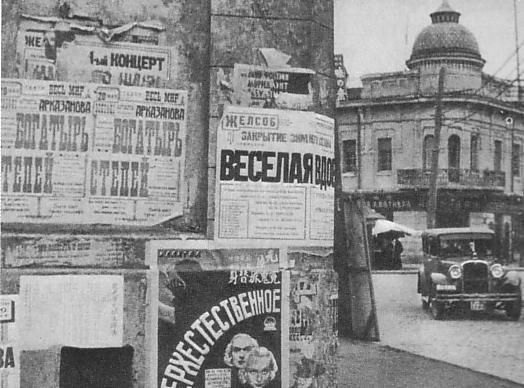
Russian advertisements in Harbin, China

Mary Vezey received a good education in China; first a prestigious Russian Girls' School in Harbin, and 1921–1922 at the North China American School in Tongzhou, Beijing. After graduation, she worked for two years for the General Secretary of the Harbin YMCA, before sailing to America in 1925. She took up study at Pomona College in Claremont, California, majoring in languages and literature and graduating in 1927. At Pomona, she was actively involved in various clubs and societies, and her English poetry began to gain her recognition. She was invited to join the Scribblers Society, an exclusive, invitation-only society which had been founded in 1913. An article on Chinese poetry, and two of her poems, were published in the society's journal.

Returning to Harbin, Vezey worked for her father's paper, and in other roles benefitting from her ability to speak Russian and English. Her first poetry collection, Stikhotvoreniia (Poems), was published in Harbin to a positive reception. It was distinctive in being bilingual, containing 127 poems in Russian, 13 in English, 11 Russian to English translations, and 8 English to Russian. Vezey translated poems by a number of well known poets into Russian. Among these were Edna St. Vincent Millay, Sara Teasdale, and George Santayana.

In 1933, the family moved to Shanghai, and Vezey's second poetry collection was published in 1936, entitled Stikhotvoreniia (Poems) II. All of its 52 poems were in Russian. In 1939, the family moved again, this time to San Francisco. Vezey's father died shortly after their arrival, and her mother in 1950.

In 1940, Vezey married Evgenii Fedorovich Tourkoff (1908–1981), an engineer, and the couple soon had a daughter, Olga. In San Francisco, she continued to write and translate, her poems published in collections in the US and Europe. Her third collection, Golubaia trava (Blue Grass), was published in 1973 and dedicated to her husband.

Though her work was frequently described as 'emigre' poetry, Vezey felt she was both Russian and American; an emigre of neither nation. She wrote:

In Russia my poems are now published as emigre poetry, but I am not an Emigre at all. Although I write in Russian, I am an eleventh-generation American! Recently, a wonderful (though terrifying) series 'The Civil War' was shown on television, and I felt it very keenly. I saw several of my relatives (southerners) there. When my schoolmates in a Russian school had asked me who I was, a Russian or an American, I had proudly answered that I was hundred per cent Russian and hundred per cent American.

During her later years, Vezey expressed the desire to gather and publish translated works of those she was concerned would be lost or forgotten. She died in San Francisco on October 18, 1994. The collected poems and translations of Mary Custis Vezey were published in 2005 as A Moongate in My Wall, edited by Olga Bakich.
