= Georgy Ivanov =

Russian poet and essayist (1894–1958)

- Георгий Владимирович Иванов
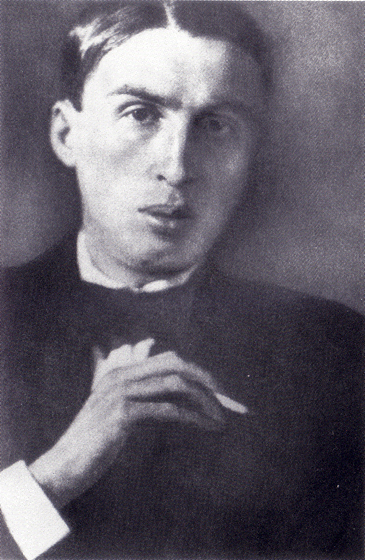
- Ivanov in 1921
- Born: Georgy Vladimirovich Ivanov; 10 November [O.S. 29 October] 1894; Seda, Kovno Governorate, Russian Empire
- Died: 26 August 1958 (aged 63); Hyères, Var, France
- Writing career
- Genres: prose, poetry
- Movement: acmeism

Georgy Vladimirovich Ivanov (Russian: Георгий Владимирович Иванов; 10 November [O.S. 29 October] 1894 – 26 August 1958) was a Russian poet and essayist of the Russian emigration between the 1930s and 1950s.

As a banker's son, Ivanov spent his young manhood in the elite circle of Russian golden youth. [His father actually was a military officer, with a rank of lieutenant colonel, retiring in 1902]. He started writing verses, imitative of Baudelaire and the French Symbolists, at a precocious age. Although his technique of versification was impeccable, he had no life experience to draw upon. The favourite subjects of his early poetry were Rococo mannerisms and gallant festivals. He named two of his books The Embarkment for Cythera, alluding to Watteau's painting.

After practicing a variety of Russian Futurism, as promoted by Igor Severyanin, Ivanov came to associate himself with the Acmeism movement. Although not considered a major talent, the 20-year-old was addressed or mentioned in poems by Osip Mandelshtam and Anna Akhmatova. He was also considered to be one of the best pupils of the informal "Guild of Poets" school organized by Nikolay Gumilyov and Sergei Gorodetsky.

Ivanov was the only prominent member of this circle who emigrated westward. His natural arrogance and peremptory judgements easily won him respect and admiration of his younger contemporaries. He promoted himself as the only remnant of the highly sophisticated milieu of the Russian Silver Age. To augment his standing, he issued a book of memoirs, entitled Petersburg Winters, which contained a fictionalized or exaggerated account of his experiences with the Acmeists. The book alienated Ivanov from his elder contemporaries but won instant acclaim from his disciples.

Together with his wife Irina Odoyevtseva and his fellow critic Georgy Adamovich, Ivanov became the principal arbiter of taste of the emigrant society, forging or destroying literary reputations. However, their literary taste was somewhat deficient: they inadvertently dismissed Tsvetayeva's genuine lyrics (when anonymously submitted by her to a poetry contest) as a crude imitation of Tsvetayeva's manner. They enthusiastically feuded with Russian litterateurs in Berlin, with Vladimir Nabokov becoming a favourite target of their attacks. Nabokov revenged himself by satirizing Ivanov in one of his best-known short stories, Spring in Fialta, and by creating a clever mystification which resulted in Adamovich's immoderate praise of Nabokov's verses printed under an alias.

In 1938 he published a prose poem Disintegration of the Atom, which was denounced by most of the émigrés (including Nabokov and Vladislav Khodasevich) and praised by his admirer V. Zlobin and Zinaida Gippius.

Afflicted with alcoholism and suffering from despondency, Ivanov sank ever lower. It was in conditions of abject penury and total despair that Ivanov's best poems were created. His art culminated in his last cycle of poems, written in the days preceding his death. In one of his last pieces, Ivanov prophetically promised "to return to Russia as poems". His wife returned to Leningrad during Perestroika and died there in 1990.

Following Ivanov's death, his reputation has been steadily augmented. His "poetry of brilliant despair", as one critic put it, is taken by some to presage the tenets of French Existentialism.

== Editions ==
- Georgy Ivanov, On the Border of Snow and Melt: Selected Poems. Translated and Annotated by Jerome Katsell and Stanislav Shvabrin. Introduction by Stanislav Shvabrin. Santa Monica: Perceval Press, 2011 (bilingual Russian-English edition, 532 pages, ISBN 978-0-9774869-4-6).
