= St. Antony's Syro-Malabar Forane Church, Kurumpanadam =

Religious building in India

Kurumpanadam Forane Church in Kerala, India is on a hillock about 6 km east of Changanacherry and 800 metres north of Perumpanachy Junction. This area was a part of Changanacherry Parish in ancient days and later from 1835 to 1837 under the jurisdiction of Thuruthi Parish. The Mooppachanmar (Senior Fathers) who had visited Kurumbanadu to select aspirants for priesthood selected Chorikkavungal Zackarias and Mukkattukunnel Thomas from this area. They requested the Catholics of this area to erect a church. Following their request, 93 Catholic families who had inhabited Kurumbanadu erected the first Catholic Church here on 13 June 1837. It had stood on the north of the present church. As the church was not spacious enough, the construction of a new church was started in 1844. Fr. Philipose Chalackal, a parishioner of Thuruthi, was the vicar of Kurumpanadu. The main role in the construction of the new church was played by Fathers Thomas Mukkattukunnel and Zackarias Chorickavunkal.

== Local seminary ==
There had been a local seminary at Kurumbanadu, erected in 1843 with the permission of the Bishop of Varapuzha. The seminary was administered by European missionaries of the Carmelite Order. Seven seminarians of the first intake of this seminary including Fathers Thomas Mukkattukunnel and Zackarias Chorikavunkal were ordained by the Bishop of Varapuzha in 1852.

== The clothing of Puthenparampil Thomachan ==
Puthenparampil Thomachan from Edathuva, who had founded the Franciscan munnam sabha in Kerala, received the religious habit (sabha vastram) in 1868 at Kurumbanadu church from vicar Palakkunnel Valiachan. This incident is recorded in the church annals as, "Puthenparampil Thomachan vowed that he would wear the habit (sabha vastram) of Anchukaya Prasiskose’s munnam sabha on 26 dhanu 1868 which was the Feast of St. Esthaphanose. With my unworthy hands I enrobed him with the habit of Franciscan munnam sabha on the steps of Mar Antony’s church at Kurumbanadu. It was not the custom of Malayali males to cover the upper part of their body in those days."

== St. Peter’s English Middle School ==
St. Peter’s English Middle School was established at Kurumpanadu in 1921 under the leadership of Fr. Jacob Kandankaril. Fr. George Mukkattukunnel (Junior), a seminarian, took much effort in the establishment of the school. Archbishop Mar Joseph Powvathil was a former student of this school. This Middle School was upgraded to a High School on 2 June 1952. The first manager of the school was Fr. George Mukkattukunnel. The foundation stone of the High School building was laid by Archbishop Mar Mathew Kavukattu on 29 June 1952. In course of time the High School grew into the present St. Peter’s Higher Secondary School. Higher Secondary classes were started here in 1998. There is an L.P. School named St. Antony’s L.P. School under the management of the church.

== Marthomadasasangham ==
Mar Thomas Kurialassery became the Bishop of Changanacherry Diocese in 1911. He selected a group of young people for the purpose of conducting prayers in remote areas and teaching catechism to the people. They conducted prayers in different places where there were no churches. Thomas Kurialassery also made a by-law for their activities and named them as "Marthommadasasangham". He also arranged a two-day training for "Marthommadasasangham" members at parel minor seminary at Changanacherry. Fr. Dominic Thottassery was the first president of Marthommadasasangham. Thrikidithanam, Mannila, Kurumpanadam and Payipadu were the main functional areas of Marthommadasasangham. Changanacherry Cathedral Church and Kurumpanadam Church were the main centers of Marthommadasasangham at that time.

Marthomadasasangham conducted prayers in Mannilakunnu. Once a year the members of the dasasangham of Changanassery Diocese used to celebrate the thirunnal of Marthoma Sleeha at Mannilakkunnu under the auspices of the Kurumbanadam unit. A cross was erected at Mannulakkunnu in June 1927. Later a shed was erected there and the image of the Holy Family was placed there. The function was led by Fathers Sauriyar and Thomas Kalayamkandathil. The members of the dasasangham of the Kurumpanadam unit began to conduct prayers there every Wednesday.

== Holy Family Church Mannila ==
Holy Family church was established in 1927. The old church was created in 1940. Later in 1995 a new church was created in Mannilakunnu. Fr. Karingada Thomma erected a cross in Mannilakunnu in 1927 with the help of Marthommadasasangham members. Fr. Dominic Thottassery was the president of Marthommadasasangham. Holy Family Church situated nearly 10 km away from Changanacherry. It comes under the Archdiocese of Changanacherry and the forane of Kurumpanadam.

In 1929 the construction work of a convent belonging to the Clarist Order began at Kurumbanadu. It was consecrated on 10 May 1930. St. Joseph’s English Medium School is functioning under the convent.

It was decided to erect the present church in 1956, construction work started in 1961 and it was consecrated in 1967 by Mar Mathew Kavukattu. It was the third renovation of the church at Kurmbanadu. The present church was erected on the site of the second church. The efforts and leadership of Fr. George Mukkattukunnel for the erection of the church were unforgettable. The convenor of the construction work was Chacko Mathew Kollamparampil (Pappachan). Under the tenure of Fr. George Thachangaril, land was acquired for a cemetery and a big cemetery was constructed. The 150th Jubilee of the parish was also celebrated in 1937.

During the tenure of Fr. Kuriakose Parambathu (later Vicar General) Kurumbanadam was raised to a Forane Church. The parish churches in Rajamattom, Mammoodu, Mannilla and Assumption are under Kurumbanadam Forane Church. The parishes of Madappalli, Assumption and Mannilla were carved out of Kurumbanadam parish. Some parishioners of Veroor and Mammoodu had been the parishioners of Kurumbanadam before they were erected as parishes. Freedom fighter Sri. P. J. Sebastian ex-M.L.A. was a member of Kurumbanadam Parish.

The new parish hall situated on the east of the church was erected by the efforts of vicar Fr. Antony Kunnathettu. The foundation stone of the parish hall was laid by Mar Joseph Powathil on 14 December 1990, and it was consecrated in December 1991. For the convenience of parishioners residing in Kannamchira, the church belonging to the Malankara Rite was bought under the initiative of parish priest Fr. George Idathinakathu and made it a part of the parish. Fr. George renovated it and it was made a kurisupalli of Kurumbanadu church. The consecration of this kurissupalli was performed by Mar Joseph Powathil on 1 January 1995. The foundation stone of the present vicarage was laid by Vicar General George Aalanchery on 14 August 1994. It was consecrated by Mar Joseph Powathil on 31 January 1997. The chapel in the cemetery was constructed with the financial assistance from Sri Babychan Chethippuzha. It was decided to consecrate the chapel by Mar Joseph Powathil on 6 January on which Danaha thirunnal is celebrated. A new kodimaram was erected with the financial assistance of Sri Babu Jacob Assariparambil under the leadership of vicar Fr. Mathew Kallukalam and assistant vicars Joseph Mulavana and James Chundakkattil.

As of 2013 there were 1205 Catholic families in this parish; 28 priests and 67 sisters from this parish were serving in different parts of the world.

In 2024, the vicar is the Very Rev Father Cherian Karukaparampil.
