= Tagantsev conspiracy =

1921 fabricated Soviet monarchist conspiracy

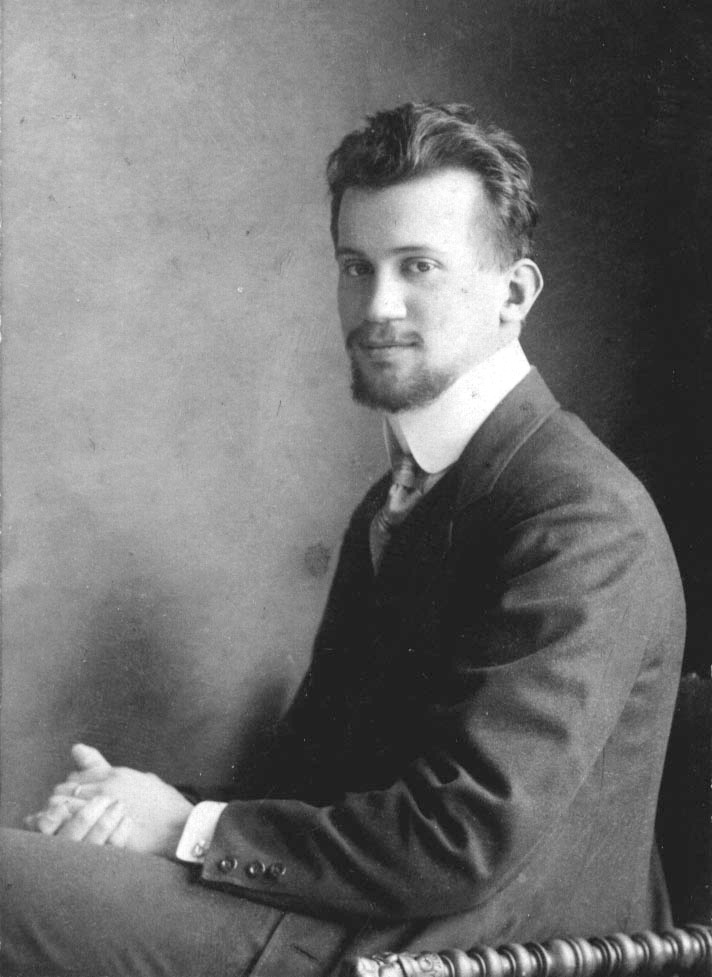
Professor Vladimir Tagantsev, who was tortured and tricked into giving the names of hundreds of people to the Cheka

The Tagantsev conspiracy (or the case of the Petrograd Military Organization) was a supposed monarchist conspiracy, largely fabricated by the Soviet secret police in 1921 to both decimate and terrorize potential Soviet dissidents against the ruling Bolshevik regime. As its result, more than 800 people, mostly from scientific and artistic communities in Petrograd (modern-day Saint Petersburg), were arrested on false terrorism charges, out of which 98 were executed and many were sent to labour camps. Among the executed was the poet Nikolay Gumilev, the co-founder of the influential Acmeist movement.

The affair was named after Vladimir Nikolaevich Tagantsev, a geographer and member of the Russian Academy of Sciences, who was arrested, tortured, and tricked into disclosing hundreds of names of people who did not like the Bolshevik regime. Among the security officers that manufactured the case was Yakov Agranov, who later became one of the chief organizers of Stalinist show trials and the Great Purge in the 1930s. The case was officially declared fabricated and its victims rehabilitated by Russian authorities in 1992.

== Background ==
On December 5, 1920, all departments of the Soviet secret police Cheka received a top secret order from Feliks Dzerzhinsky to start creating false flag White Army organizations, "underground and terrorist groups" to facilitate finding "foreign agents on our territory". This was planned partially as a provocation, in order to identify potentially disloyal citizens who might wish to join the Bolsheviks' enemies.

A few months later, in February 1921, the Kronstadt rebellion began. This was a left-wing uprising against the Bolshevik regime by soldiers and sailors. Additionally, the Bolsheviks understood that the majority of intelligentsia did not support them. On March 8, the Council of People's Commissars (Sovnarkom) send a letter to People's Commissariat for Education (Narkompros) asking to identify a group of unreliable intellectuals who could be a target of future repressions.

On June 4, Bolshevik leader Vladimir Lenin received a telegram from Leonid Krasin about a convention of monarchists, cadets and right-wing members of the Socialist-Revolutionary Party in Paris who anticipated an uprising against Bolsheviks in Petrograd. Lenin sent a telegram to Cheka co-founder Józef Unszlicht stating that he did not trust the Cheka in Petrograd any longer. In the telegram, he issued an order to urgently send "the most experienced Chekists to Piter" and find the conspirators. This was a signal for the Cheka in Petrograd to fabricate the case.

== The case ==
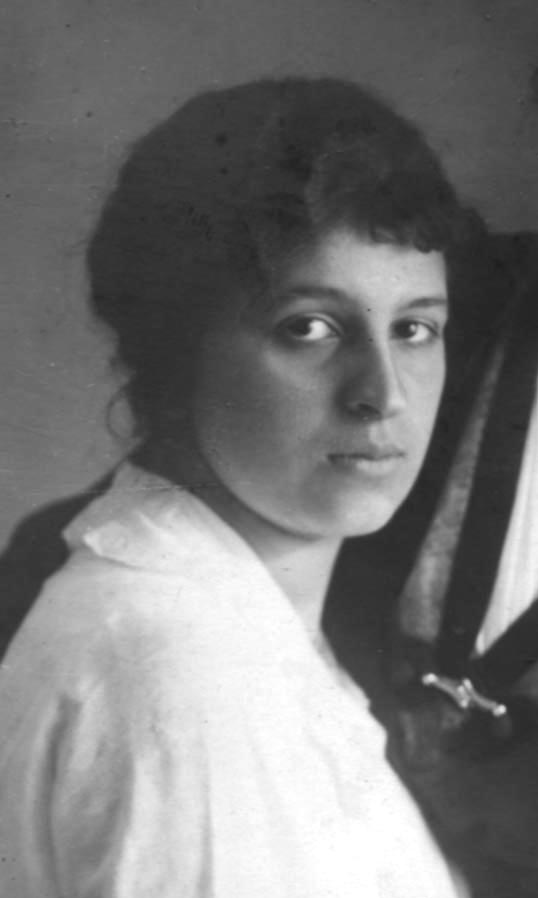
Nadezhda Tagantseva. She was executed together with her husband.

On May 31, Yuri German, a former officer of Imperial Russian Army and a Finnish spy, was killed while crossing the Finnish border. He had a notebook with numerous addresses, one of which belonged to professor Vladimir Tagantsev, who was previously identified by Cheka agents as a "disloyal person". Tagantsev and other people whose addresses were found in the notebook were arrested. During the next month the investigators of the Cheka worked hard to manufacture the case, but without much success. The arrested refused to admit any guilt and it was difficult to connect together so many completely unrelated people. After intense interrogation, Tagantsev tried to hang himself on June 21.

On June 25, two investigators of Petrograd Cheka, Gubin and Popov, prepared a report, according to which the "organization included only Tagantsev and a few couriers and supporters," the conspirators planned "to establish common language between intelligentsia and masses," that "terror was not their intention," and German delivered news about current events to Tagantsev from abroad. The report stated that "the organization of Tagantsev had no connection and received no support from the Finnish or other counter-intelligence organizations." The report also noted that "Tagantsev is a cabinet scientist who thought about his organization theoretically" and "was incapable of doing practical work." After this report, the names of Gubin and Popov disappeared from the case, suggesting they had been replaced by other investigators.

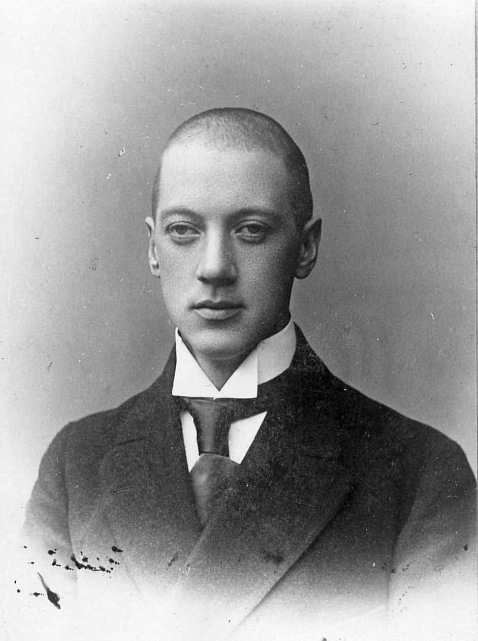
Russian poet Nikolay Gumilev, one of the executed.

After the initial failure, Yakov Agranov was appointed to lead the case. He arrested more people and took Tagantsev for interrogation after keeping him for 45 days in solitary confinement. Agranov gave an ultimatum; if Tagantsev did not confess, then he and all other hostages would be executed after three hours, however, no one would be harmed if he agreed to cooperate. According to publications by Russian emigrants, the agreement was even signed on paper and personally guaranteed by Vyacheslav Menzhinsky. After signing the agreement, Tagantsev provided the names of several hundred people who he alleged had criticized the Bolshevik regime. All of them were arrested on July 31 and during the first days of August.

According to the official version invented by Agranov, the leaders of conspiracy included Tagantsev, Finnish spy German, and former colonel of Russian army Vycheslav Shvedov who acted under pseudonym "Vyacheslavsky" and shot two Chekists during his arrest. To enlarge the conspiracy, they included many completely unrelated people, including former aristocrats, contrabandists, "suspicious" people and wives of those who were already arrested. The newspaper The Petrograd Pravda published a report by the Petrograd Cheka that the military organization of Tagantsev planned to burn plants, kill people and commit other acts of terrorism using weapons and dynamite.

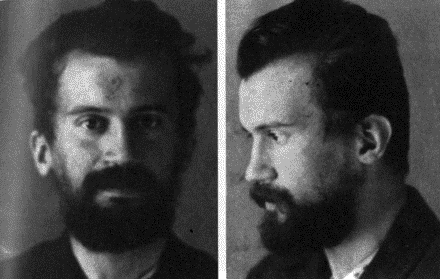
Photo of Tagantsev during the investigation

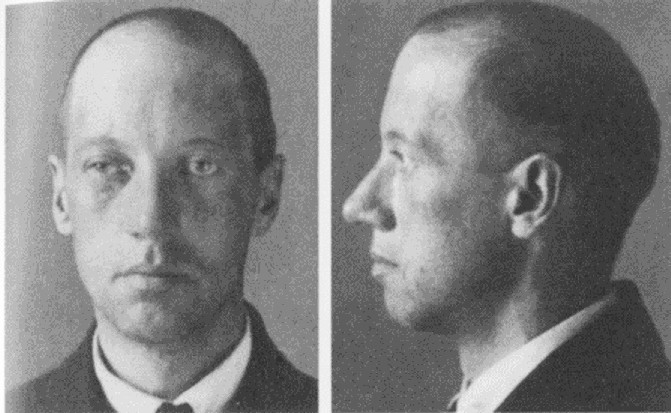
Photo of Gumilev during the investigation

The most famous victim of the case was the poet Nikolay Gumilev. Gumilev was arrested by the Cheka on August 3. He admitted that he thought about joining the Kronstadt rebellion if it were to spread to Petrograd and talked about this with Vyacheslavsky. Gumilev was executed by a firing squad, together with 60 other people on August 24 in the Kovalevsky Forest. Thirty-seven others were shot on October 3. Agranov commented about the operation: "Seventy percent of the Petrograd intelligentsia had one leg in the enemy camp. We had to burn that leg."

== Aftermath ==
The action reportedly failed to terrify the population. According to academician Vladimir Vernadsky, the case "had a shocking effect and produced not a feeling of fear, but of hatred and contempt" against the Bolsheviks. After the Tagantsev case Lenin decided that it would be easier to exile undesired intellectuals.

== See also ==
- Active measures
- Operation Trust
- Prompartiya
- Red terror
- Syndicate-2
