= Moscow, India =

Moscow mōskkō
- village
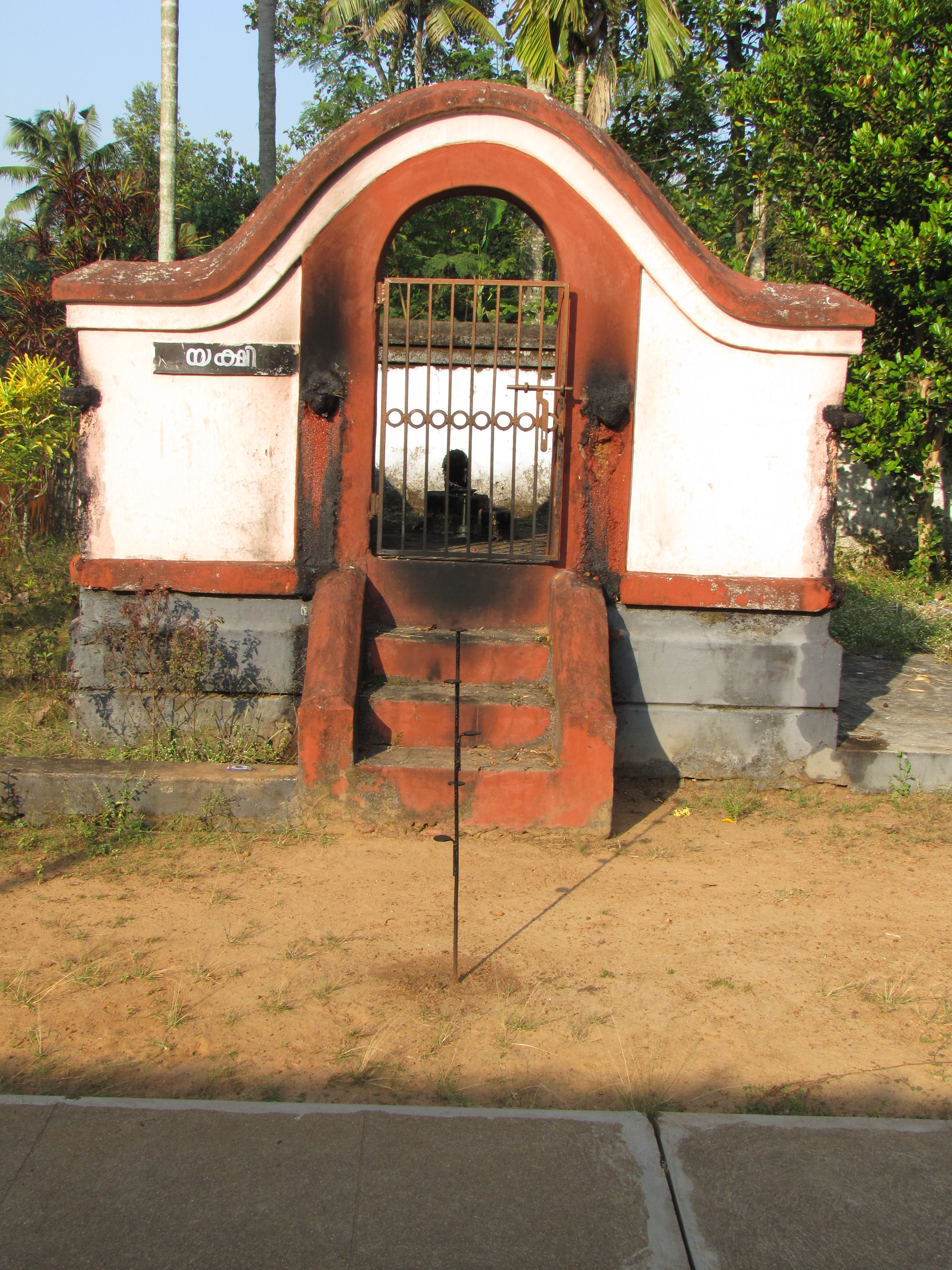
- Yakshi temple, Veroor

- Location within Kerala Location within India
- Coordinates: 9°32′0″N 76°37′0″E
- Country: India
- State: Kerala
- District: Kottayam

Languages
  - Official: Malayalam, English
- Time zone: UTC+5:30 (IST)
- PIN: 686546
- Vehicle registration: KL-33

Moscow (Malayalam: mōskkō) is a village in the Kottayam district of Kerala, South India. The name was instituted because of Soviet influence in Kerala during the Cold War.

== Overview ==
Located near Thengana, Moscow is accessible by bus and lies midway between Thiruvalla and Changanasseri. Initially a small hamlet, it grew into a suburb of Chanaganasseri with facilities including hospitals, schools (Good Shepherd School) and churches within walking distance. Kottayam, Changanasseri and Tiruvalla are the major towns nearby and the nearest railway station is Changanasseri railway station.

=== Economy ===
- Madappally Service Co-operative Bank runs a fertilizer depot at Moscow.

== See also ==
- Veroor
