= Veroor =

Village in Kottayam District, Kerala, India

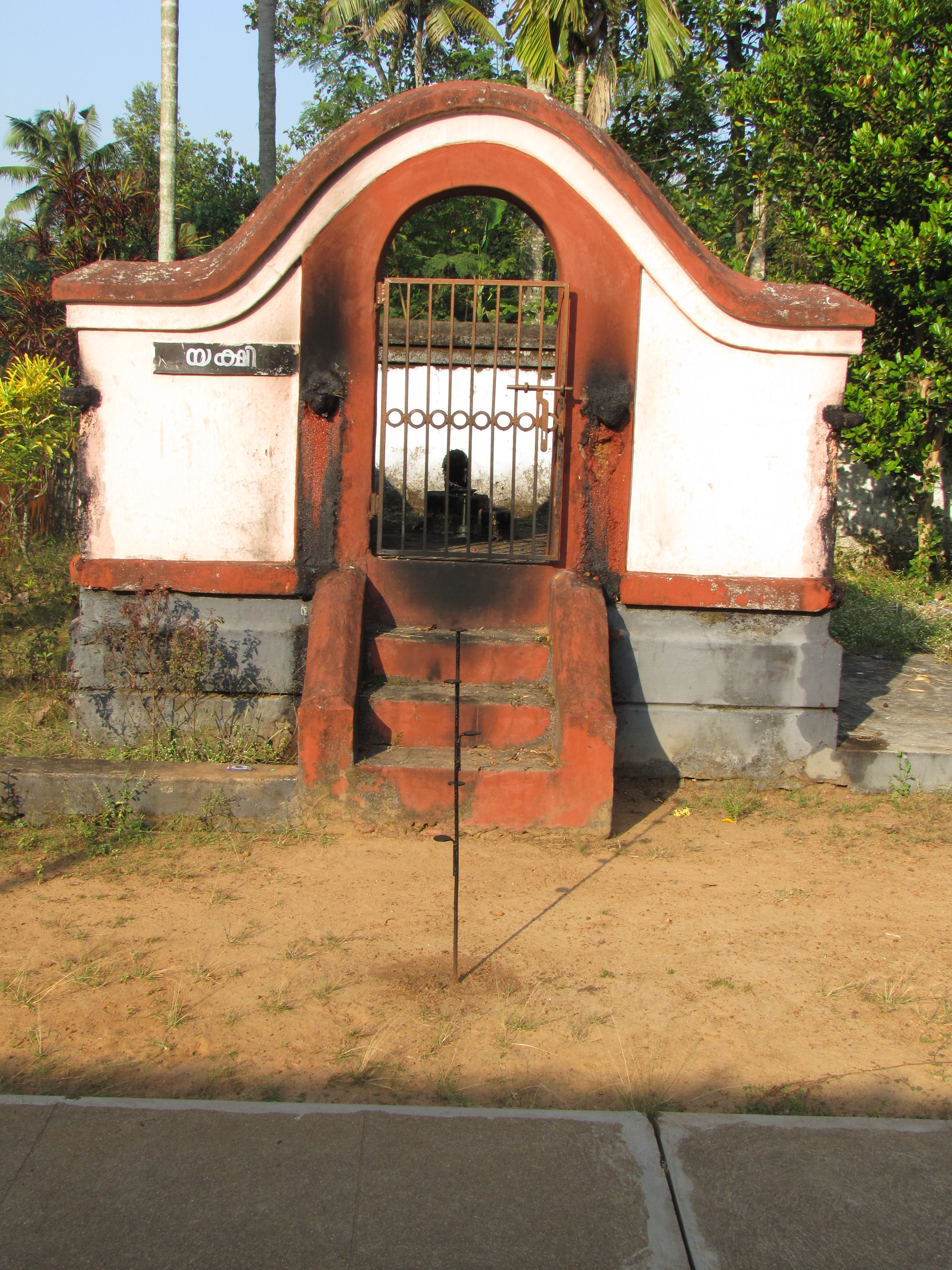
The idol of Yakshi

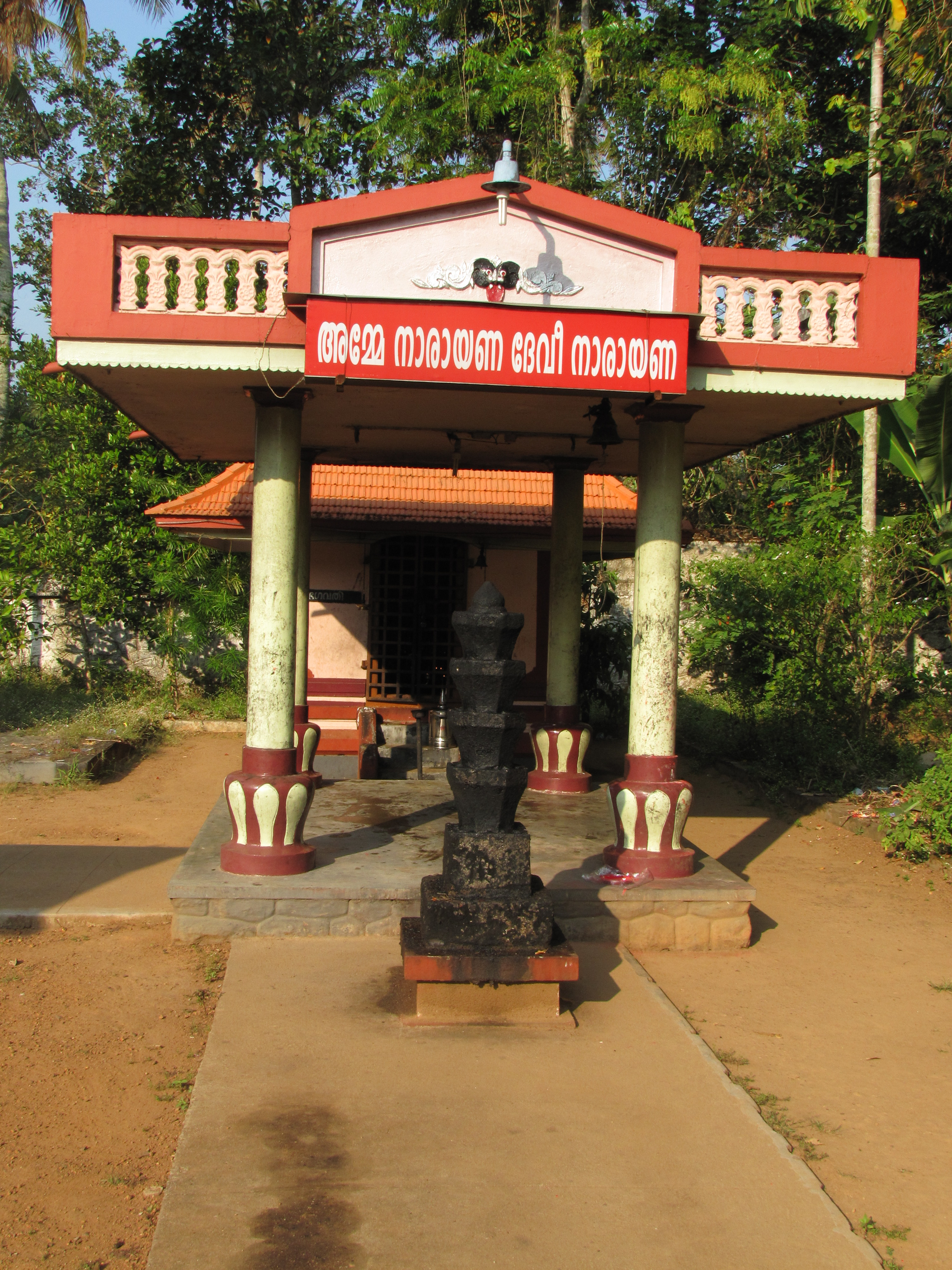
Dharma Shastha Temple

Veroor, a small township, in Changanacherry, Kottayam, Kerala, India.

== Industrial Estate ==
The main landmark of Veroor is the Mini industrial estate(MIE). MIE consists of around 20 Small Scale Industries(SSI) or units. The units in the MIE formed a consortium, approved by Government of India, to help each other in buying raw materials and selling their finished goods in bulk. Most of the units are manufacturing Rubber Products(Hollow mats, Coir Mats, Rice Polishers, Soles, Cycle tubes, etc.). As Kottayam, the district where the Veroor comes under, is famous for the Rubber Plantation, is a great source of raw materials for these units.

== Exporting Units ==
Some units in the Mini Industrial Estate export the products to Europe, Australia, America and to other Asian Countries.

== Neighbourhood ==
•Thengana-Moscow •Perumpanachy •Nalunnakkal •Kannavatta
