= Yakov Agranov =

NKVD officer (1893–1938)

- Я́ков Агра́нов
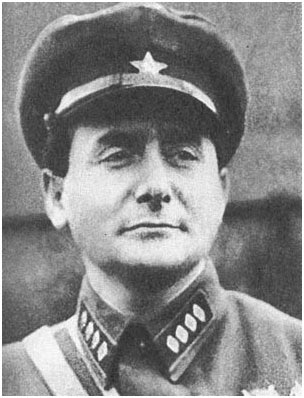

Director of the Main Directorate of State Security
- In office 29 December 1936 – 15 April 1937
- Preceded by: Genrikh Yagoda
- Succeeded by: Mikhail Frinovsky

First Deputy People's Commissar for Internal Affairs
- In office 10 July 1934 – 15 April 1937
- Preceded by: position established
- Succeeded by: Mikhail Frinovsky

Personal details
- Born: Yankel Samuilovich Sorenson; 12 October 1893 Checherskaya, Gomel Region, Belarus (then Mogilev Governorate, Russian Empire)
- Died: 1 August 1938 (aged 44) Moscow, Russian SFSR, Soviet Union
- Party: All-Union Communist Party (Bolsheviks)
- Other political affiliations: Socialist Revolutionary Party (1912–1915); Russian Social Democratic Labour Party (1915–1917)
- Awards: Order of the Red Banner (twice)

Military service
- Allegiance: Russian Soviet Federative Socialist Republic (1919–1922); Soviet Union (1922–1938)
- Branch/service: Cheka; GPU; OGPU; GUGB; NKVD
- Years of service: 1919–1938
- Rank: Commissioner of State Security 1st Rank

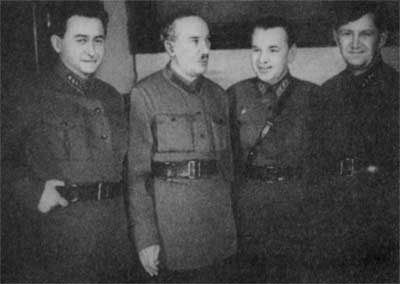
Yakov Agranov in 1934. From left to right: Agranov, Yagoda, unknown, and Redens.

Yakov Saulovich Agranov (Russian: Я́ков Сау́лович Агра́нов; born Yankel Samuilovich Sorenson; 12 October 1893 – 1 August 1938) was the first chief of the Soviet Main Directorate of State Security and a deputy of NKVD chief Genrikh Yagoda. He is known as one of main organizers of Soviet political repressions and Stalinist show trials in the 1920s and 1930s. He fabricated the "Tagantsev conspiracy" case and the Moscow trials, including the Trial of the Twenty One and the Industrial Party Trial, as well as mass arrests and executions in Saint Petersburg during Joseph Stalin's Great Purge.

== Biography ==
Agranov was born in 1893 in a Jewish shopkeeper's family in Checherskaya, a village in the Mogilev Governorate of the Russian Empire. In 1912 he joined the Socialist Revolutionary Party while working as a clerk and in 1915 joined the Russian Social Democratic Labour Party. He was arrested by the tsarist police in 1915 and exiled to Yenesei province.

In 1918, Agranov became secretary of Sovnarkom. At this time he was taking orders directly from Vladimir Lenin and Felix Dzerzhinsky. During this period Agranov was put in charge of compiling the lists of intellectuals for the forced exile of leading figures of Russian sciences and culture that were seen as the anti-Soviet element. Among those expelled were Nikolai Berdyaev and Nikolai Lossky.

In 1921, Agranov was the chief investigator into the "Petrograd military organization", allegedly headed by Vladimir Tagantsev. Tagantsev was arrested and then tricked into giving the names of 300 "conspirators", who, he was told, would not be executed. in exchange for leniency for himself. The investigation ended with more than 85 persons being sentenced to death, including Tagantsev himself and the poet Nikolay Gumilyov. All concerned were promptly executed. When asked why he was so merciless, Agranov responded: "Seventy percent of Petrograd intellectuals were standing by one leg in the camp of our enemies. We had to burn that leg off".

Agranov also investigated the Kronstadt rebellion and the peasant uprising in Tambov region. At the end of his career he led the Trial of the Twenty One against the Trotskyist Anti-Soviet Military Organization, the "Promparty" and "Working Peasant Party" cases. The cynical motto "If there is no enemy, he should be created, denounced and punished" was attributed to Yakov Agranov.

Agranov was also implicated in suspicions concerning the suicide of poet Vladimir Mayakovsky in 1930. Mayakovsky, a former lover of Lilya Brik, shot himself with a gun given to him as a gift by Agranov, who, himself, had had a later affair with Brik, well known as the muse of Mayakovsky.

Immediately after the assassination of Sergey Kirov in Leningrad on 1 December 1934, Agranov was entrusted with the organization of mass reprisals in the city. Stalin ordered him to fabricate a story that Lev Kamenev, Grigory Zinoviev and other leaders of the opposition were responsible for the murder, but he seems to have resisted, whereupon Stalin entrusted Nikolai Yezhov with the job instead. In 1935, he was ordered by Yezhov to track down and liquidate "an undiscovered centre of Trotskyists" in Moscow, as a preparatory step for the Great Purge that Stalin was planning. When Yezhov took over as head of the NKVD, Agranov remained his First Deputy, and in December 1936 was appointed Head of the Chief Directorate of State Security, which seemingly meant that he was to be trusted to purge the NKVD of officers Yezhov did not trust. In February 1937, he circulated among regional NKVD heads a demand for names of Trotskyists and other oppositionists employed with the state security apparatus. In April, he was demoted to the post of regional NKVD chief in Saratov. He was arrested on 20 July 1937, and appeared on the execution list of 1 November 1937, in which his name was crossed out. He was executed by firing squad as an "enemy of the people" on 1 August 1938.

== Wife ==
Agranova Valentina Aleksandrovna (Kukhareva, née Chernyavskaya), born in 1900, a native of Kovno and a homemaker, was arrested together with her husband on the same day. She was included in Stalin’s list of August 20, 1938, under Category 1 (“List of wives of enemies of the people”; approved by Stalin and Molotov). On August 26, 1938, she was sentenced to death and executed the same day together with the wives of a number of prominent party officials, Chekists, and military figures, including Inna Artuzova, Raisa Gai, Serafima Zakovskaya, Yevgenia Eikhe, Matilda Pramnek, Valentina Dybenko-Sedyakina, Tatyana Postysheva-Postolovskaya, Valentina Orlova, and others. Her burial place is the NKVD special site Kommunarka. On October 24, 1957, she was posthumously rehabilitated by the Military Collegium of the Supreme Court of the USSR.
