= Apollon (magazine) =

Russian avant-garde literary magazine

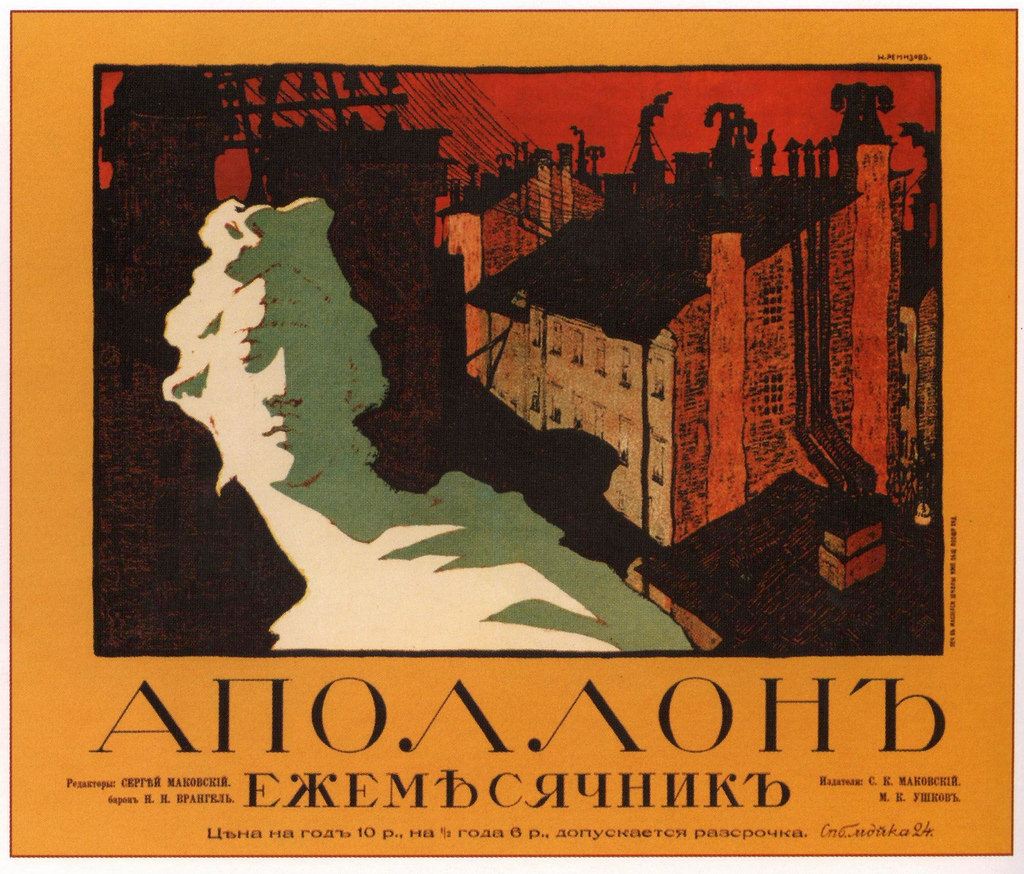
Advertising poster for Apollon (1911).

Apollon (Russian: Аполло́н) was a Russian avant-garde literary magazine that served as a principal publication of the Russian modernist movement in the early 20th century. It was published between 1909 and 1917 in Saint Petersburg.

== History and profile ==
Apollon was established by the literary critic S. K. Makovsky in 1909 and soon became a venue for the polemics that marked the decline of the symbolist movement in Russian poetry. It was first a monthly supplement of the Literaturny Almanakh. Then its frequency became ten times a year. The headquarters of the magazine was in St Petersburg. In 1910, two seminal essays that appeared in Apollon -- Mikhail Kuzmin's On Beautiful Clarity (O prekrasnoy yasnosti) and Nikolai Gumilyov's The Life of Verse (Zhizn' stikha) -- heralded the emergence of Acmeist poetry. The magazine ceased publication in 1917.
