= Julian Shchutsky =

Russian sinologist (1897 – 1938)

- Born: Julian Shchutsky; August 11, 1897; Ekaterinburg, Russian Empire
- Died: February 18, 1938 (aged 40); Leningrad, Russian SFSR, Soviet Union
- Education: Saint Petersburg University
- Known for: translated the I Ching
- Scientific career
- Fields: sinology

Julian Konstantinovich Shchutsky (Russian: Юлиан Константинович Шуцкий, 11 August 1897, Ekaterinburg – February 18, 1938, Leningrad) was a Russian sinologist.

== Education and scientific career ==
Shchutsky's father was of noble origin; he was a member of the House of Czartoryski, and worked as a forestry scientist. Shchutsky's mother was a music teacher.

Shchutsky graduated from Saint Petersburg University in 1921 and was a research scientist in the Asiatic Museum of the Russian Academy of Sciences from 1920 to 1937. He was given bibliographical responsibility for the Taoism and Chinese alchemy portions of the museum's new acquisitions. This led directly to his translation of the Baopuzi, which was completed in 1922. He also completed extensive translations from late Tang dynasty poetry, a field in which Vasily Mikhaylovich Alekseyev had worked; some of the translations were published under Alekseyev's editorship in 1923. Julian Shchutsky's Asian linguistic accomplishments also included Manchu. Shchutsky and Alekseyev were among those who took on the special problem of the Chinese script as it presented itself in a Russian context, and were involved with the question of romanizing Chinese. A special qualifying commission in 1924 made it possible for Shchutsky to become an assistant professor in 1924, teaching at the university and also, from that year, in the Institute of Modern Oriental Languages, where he introduced Cantonese alongside Mandarin Chinese, and gave the first courses in Vietnamese. He became a professor in 1935.

Alongside this work, he was a research scientist at the State Hermitage Museum in 1936–1937, and Professor of the Leningrad Institute of Oriental Studies, Professor of the Leningrad State University in 1936–1937. From 1936 to 1937, he gave a lecture course titled "Taology" to various student groups at the Saint Petersburg University. He published more than 30 scientific research papers and books. He also translated the I Ching. Shchutsky was a polyglot, and translated from more than 16 languages.

Shchutsky was arrested in February 1938, during the Great Purge. He was convicted by a list trial ("по списку") as a "Japanese spy" and executed.

== Influence ==
Shchutsky was influenced by his teachers, the sinologists Nikolai Iosifovich Konrad and Vasiliy Mikhaylovich Alekseyev. In 1923 he and Alekseyev published "The Anthology of the Chinese Classical poetry of VII-IX centuries". Shchutsky was close friends with the poet Cherubina de Gabriak; she influenced his ideology. Shortly before her death, he visited her in Tashkent, where she, influenced by him, wrote 21 poems attributed to Li Xiang Zi, a fictional Chinese poet exiled for his "belief in immortality of human spirit".

== Books ==
- Shchutski, Julian. The I Ching, Book of Changes. Leningrad, 1937
- Shchutski, Julian. Researches on the I Ching. Princeton: Princeton University Press, 1979. Translated from the Russian by William MacDonald and Tsuyoshi Hasegawa
