= Cherubina de Gabriak =

Russian poet (1887–1928)

Elisaveta Ivanovna Dmitrieva (Russian: Елизаве́та Ива́новна Дми́триева, IPA: [jɪlʲɪzɐˈvʲetə ɪˈvanəvnə ˈdmʲitrʲɪjɪvə]; 31 March 1887 – 5 December 1928), more famously known by her literary pseudonym Cherubina de Gabriak (Russian: Черуби́на де Габриа́к, IPA: [tɕɪˈrubʲɪnə dɨ ɡəbrʲɪˈak]), was a Russian poet.

== Mysterious poet ==
In August 1909, the famous Russian artistic periodical Apollon received a letter with verses on a perfumed paper with black mourning edges, signed only by a single Russian letter Ch. The verses were filled with half-revelations about its author—supposedly a beautiful maiden with dark secrets. The same day a woman with a beautiful voice phoned the journal's publisher Sergei Makovsky and arranged for publication of the verses. Over the next few months, publications of the newfound poetic star were the major hit of the magazine, and many believed that they had found a major new talent in Russian poetry. The identity of the author was slowly revealed: her name was Baroness Cherubina de Gabriak, a Russian-speaking girl of French and Polish ancestry who lived in a very strict Roman Catholic aristocratic family, who severely limited the girl's contacts with the outside world because of an unspoken secret in her past. Almost all of Apollon’s male writers fell in love with her, most of all the great poet Nikolai Gumilyov. He wrote a series of passionate love letters to her and received quite passionate answers.

The mystery of the newfound genius was short-lived. In November it was discovered that the verses were written by a disabled schoolteacher, Elisaveta Ivanovna Dmitrieva, with the participation of a major Apollon contributor and editor, the poet Maximilian Voloshin.

Apparently Sergei Makovsky had rejected several of Dmitrieva's verses; and Voloshin, who knew his publisher quite well, invented the legend about Cherubina. There is still controversy about the correct attribution of Gabriak's corpus. Most contemporaries, including all of Apollon’s critics, were certain that all the verses and most of the letters were written by Voloshin himself; after all, they claimed, Cherubina was a first-rank poet and Dmitrieva was not. Both Elisaveta Dmitrieva and Maximilian Voloshin claimed that the verses were all Dmitrieva's, and that Voloshin only selected them and suggested themes and expressions. Modern researchers tend to support attribution of the verses to Dmitrieva, as they are quite similar to her later works.

== Duel ==
Nikolai Gumilyov was outraged by the thought that his passionate romantic correspondence might in fact have been with a mocking Maximilian Voloshin. Even so, Dmitrieva claimed that she had written the letters to Gumilyov herself, had indeed been in love, but had known the romance would end the moment Gumilyov saw her.

Gumilyov allegedly talked in public about his romantic affair with Dmitrieva and he did it in rather rude expressions, and on 19 November 1909, at the studio of artist Ivan Bilibin, Voloshin slapped Gumilyov across the face, by the customs of the time made a duel inevitable. The duel took place on 22 November on the banks of the Chernaya River, which had been the site of the fatal duel between Alexander Pushkin and Georges d'Anthès. Voloshin's seconds were Aleksei Nikolaevich Tolstoi and Count Shervashidze; Gumilyov's seconds were Mikhail Kuzmin and Eugene Znosko-Borovsky.

Antique flint smoothbore pistols without sights of the Pushkin era were chosen. Gumilyov shot first, but missed (or according to another version shot into the air). Voloshin's pistol misfired. He proposed to end the duel, but Gumilyov insisted that Voloshin has to shoot. Voloshin tried to shoot a second time - again a misfire. Gumilev insisted on Voloshin's third attempt, but the seconds refused and declared the duel over. Later, Voloshin confessed that he simply didn't know how to shoot. The seconds offered that they shake hands, but both refused. All contacts between them were broken off until a few months before Gumilyov's death in 1921, when he visited Voloshin. The next meeting and reconciliation took place only in Feodosia (in Crimea) - Gumilev denied at the meeting that he had said the words attributed to him about Dmitrieva in 1909, accused Dmitrieva herself of pure fiction.

== Elisaveta Dmitrieva ==
Elisaveta Ivanovna Dmitrieva
- Елизаве́та Ива́новна Дми́триева
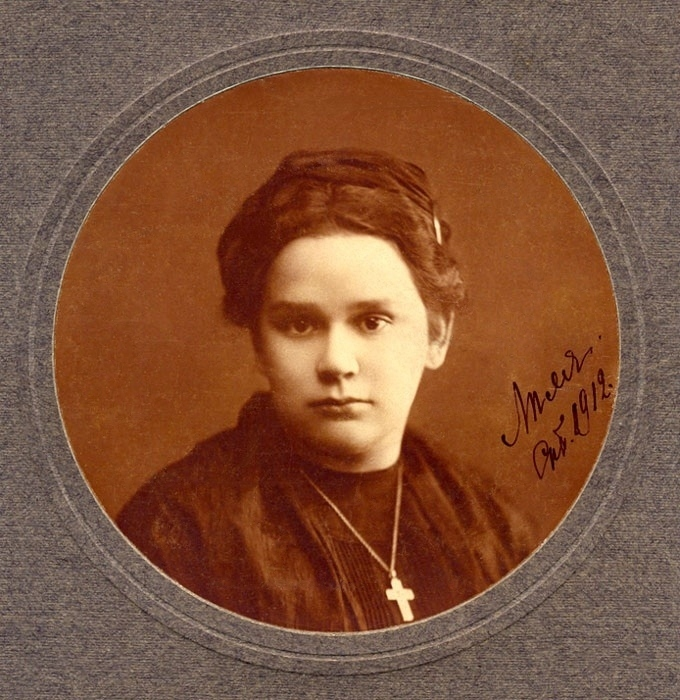
- Born: 31 March 1887; St Petersburg
- Died: 5 December 1928 (aged 41); Tashkent
- Writing career
- Pen name: Cherubina de Gabriak

The real author of Gabriak's poetry, Elisaveta Dmitrieva, was born on 31 March 1887. Between 1890 and 1903 she suffered from tuberculosis of the bones and was left lame and barely able to walk.

She studied old French and Spanish literature at Saint Petersburg State University, and published some verses both before and after her Gabriak period but without much success. In 1911 she married Vsevolod Nikolaievitch Wassilieff, an engineer and uncle of French admiral Alexandre Wassilieff and took his last name.

In the early 1920s, she worked with poet and translator Samuil Marshak on theatrical plays for children. Later she also published prose and translations.

Starting from 1921, she was searched and interrogated by the State Political Directorate along with other members of the Anthroposophic Society. Finally in 1927 she was exiled to Tashkent where she died in 1928 of liver cancer. Shortly before her death, she was visited in Tashkent by her friend a prominent Sinologist Julian Shchutsky and wrote, influenced by him, 21 poems attributed to Li Xiang Zi, a fictional Chinese poet exiled for his "belief in immortality of human spirit". The name of Li Xiang, invented by Shchutsky, means "a house under a pear tree", where Dmitrieva indeed lived in Tashkent.

== Origin of the name ==
The name, Cherubina, was taken from the story A Secret Of Telegraph Hill by Bret Harte. The last name, Gabriak, was derived from Gabriakh, the name of a toy, a wooden imp, presented by Voloshin to Elisaveta Dmitrieva. Voloshin found the name Gabriakh in the book Demonomanie des Sorciers by Jean Bodin, where it belonged to an imp, protecting people from evil spirits.

== See also ==
- Ern Malley, nonexistent Australian poet
