= Great Nevka =

River in Russia

Bolshaya Nevka
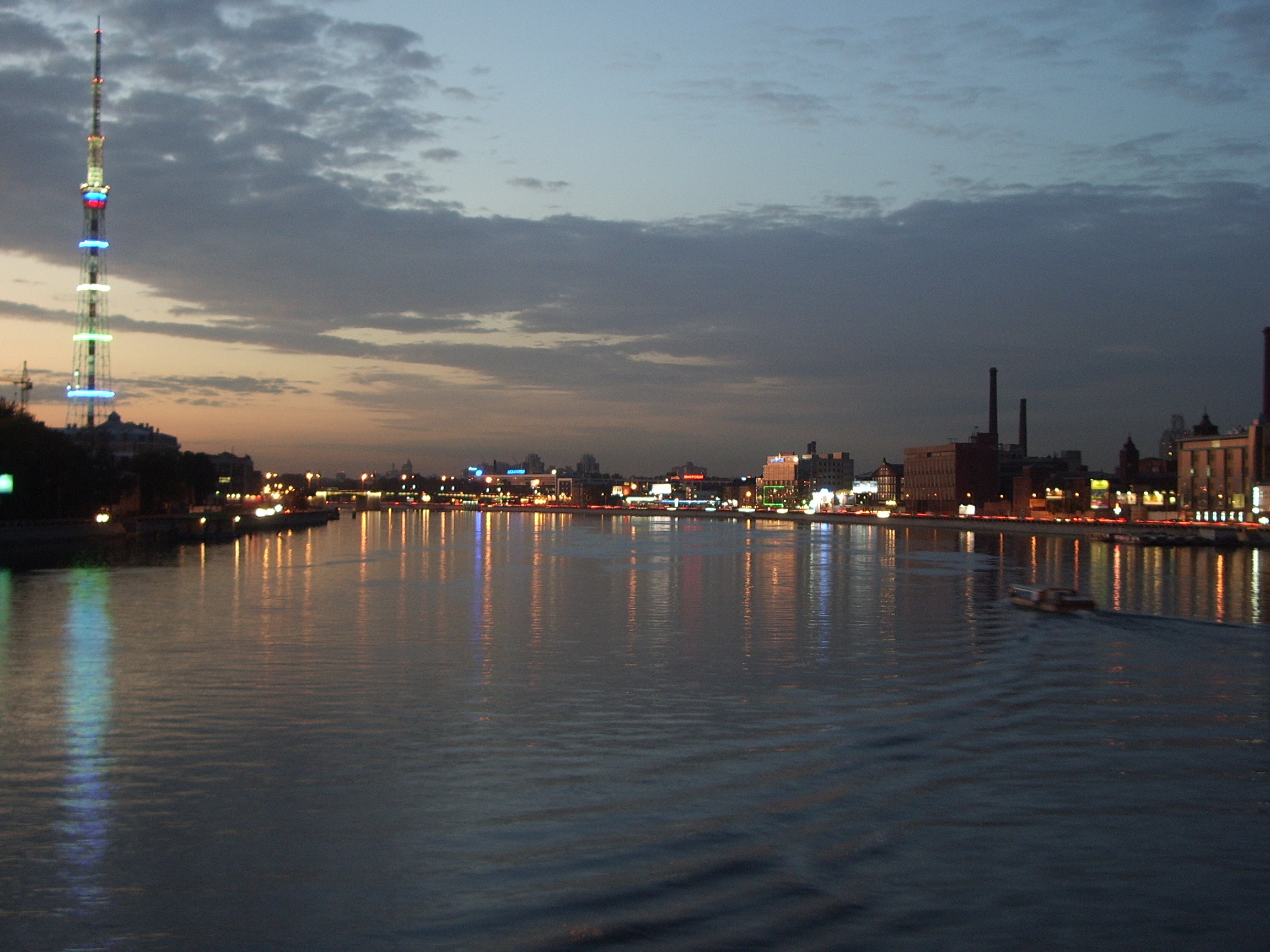
- View from the Grenadiers Bridge in September 2006
- Etymology: diminutive of Neva
- Native name: Большая Невка (Russian)

Location
- Country: Russia
- Location: Saint Petersburg

Physical characteristics
- Source
  - location: Neva
  - coordinates: 59°57′17.1″N 30°20′25.2″E
- Mouth
  - location: Neva Bay
  - coordinates: 59°58′45.3″N 30°13′32.8″E
- Length: 8.5 km (5.3 mi)

Basin features
- Tributaries
  - right: Chyornaya Rechka

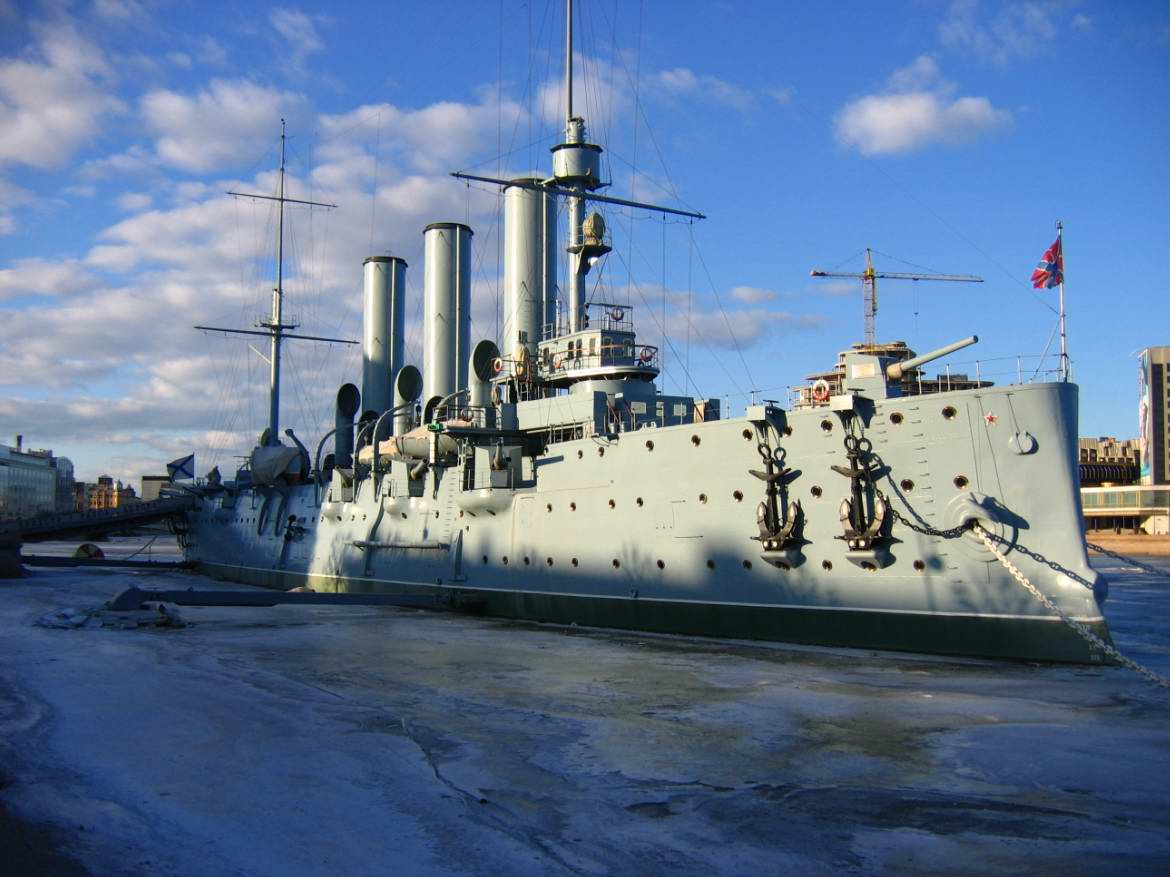
Russian cruiser Aurora moored at the source of Great Nevka

The Great Nevka or Bolshaya Nevka (Russian: Больша́я Не́вка) is an arm of the Neva that begins about 1 kilometre (0.6 mi) below the Liteyny Bridge in Saint Petersburg.

== Attractions ==
- Bridges
  - Samson Bridge
  - Grenadiers Bridge
  - Kantemirovsky Bridge
  - Ushakovsky Bridge
  - 3rd Yelagin Bridge
- Saint Petersburg TV Tower
- Russian cruiser Aurora
- Lopukhinsky Garden
- Kamenny Island Palace
- Maritime Victory Park
- Saint Petersburg Botanical Garden
- Monument to Alfred Nobel

== See also ==
- List of bridges in Saint Petersburg
