= George Ivask =

Russian-Estonian poet and literary scholar

- Born: September 14, 1907; Moscow, Russian Empire
- Died: February 13, 1986 (aged 78); Amherst, Massachusetts, United States
- Education: Tartu University
- Employer(s): University of Kansas; Indiana University Bloomington; Washington University in St. Louis; University of Massachusetts Amherst
- Writing career
- Period: 1929–1986
- Genres: Poetry, literary criticism

George Ivask (Russian: Yuri Pavlovich Ivask, Юрий Павлович Иваск, Estonian: Jüri Ivask; September 14, 1907 – February 13, 1986) was a Russian poet and literary critic; in his later years he was an American scholar of Russian literature. Ivask was born to a family of an Estonian-German father and Russian mother and he identified culturally as a Russian.

== Biography ==
George Ivask was born in Moscow, the son of Pavel Ivask, a merchant of Estonian origin, and his Russian wife. In 1920 the family moved to Estonia, where Ivask enrolled in Tartu University, which he graduated from in 1932. In 1943 he was mobilized into the German army but never made it to the front due to poor health. In 1944, anticipating the advance of the Red Army, he fled to Germany and in 1946 entered Hamburg University to pursue Slavic studies and philosophy. In 1949 he moved to the United States, where he earned his Ph.D. in Slavic languages and literatures at Harvard University. In 1955 Ivask received American citizenship. From 1969 to 1977 he taught at the University of Kansas, Indiana University Bloomington, and Arts and Sciences at Washington University in St. Louis, and then he became the head of the Russian literature department at University of Massachusetts Amherst College of Humanities and Fine Arts. Ivask retired in 1977. He was married to Tamara (née Mezak) Ivask (1916–1982).

=== Career ===
George Ivask started publishing poetry in 1929, occasionally using pseudonyms (B. Afanasyevsky, G. Issako, A.B.), mostly in Put, a magazine founded by Nikolai Berdyaev, who exerted a major influence upon him, as well as Georgy Fedotov. Ivask's first book, Severny Bereg (The Northern Shore), came out in 1938 in Warsaw. He characterized his style as 'neo-barocco', while considering himself a follower of Gavriil Derzhavin. His best-remembered work is Homo Ludens (Играющий человек, 1973), a free-montage autobiography in verse that remained unfinished.

Ivask compiled and edited In the West (На Западе, New York, 1953), an extensive anthology of the poets of the first and the second waves of Russian emigration, and he published books by Georgy Fedotov and Vasily Rozanov, as well as critical essays and Konstantin Leontyev (1974), a monograph upon the controversial Russian religious thinker. His 1983 poem "A Greeting Word from an Orthodox Man" (Приветствие православного), published in the Polish magazine Kultura in Paris, made a great impression on Pope Paul II, who invited Ivask to the Vatican for an audience. The papers from George Ivask's estate are held by Yale University.

Ivask died of a heart attack after collapsing near a pond on the campus of the University of Massachusetts Amherst in 1986.

== Select bibliography ==
=== Poetry ===
- The Northern Shore (Северный берег. 1938).
- The King's Autumn (Царская осень. 1953).
- The Praise (Хвала. Вашингтон, 1967).
- Cinderella (Золушка. New York, 1970).
- The Conquest of Mexico (Завоевание Мексики. 1984).
- I Am a Petty Bourgeois (Я — мещанин. 1986).
- Homo Ludens (Играющий человек. 1973, Unfinished. First published in 1988).

=== Prose ===
- Had There Been No Revolution (Если бы не было революции, Russkaya Mysl, novel, 1980–1981)
- The Conquest of Mexico (Завоевание Мексики, short novel, 1986)
- A Tale About Poetry (Повесть о стихах, 1987)

=== Criticism ===
- An Apology of Pessimism. K. Leontyev and Nietzsche (Апология пессимизма. К. Леонтьев и Ницше. Novy Grad, 1939)
- Yuri Rozanov and Rev. P. Florensky (Юрий Розанов и о. П. Флоренский. 1965)
- The Life and Works of Konstantin Leontyev (Константин Леонтьев. Жизнь и творчество. Bern-Frankfurt. 1974)
- Things That Leontyev Revered, Valued and Loved (Что Леонтьев чтил, ценил, любил. 1974)
- A Praise to the Russian Poetry (Похвала русской поэзии. Mosty/Bridges, Munich; Novy Zhurnal / New Journal, New York. 1983–1986. Tallinn, 2002)
