= Kovalevsky forest =

Coordinates: 59°59′20″N 30°38′00″E

Kovalevsky forest (Russian: Ковалевский лес) is a forest near St Petersburg, Russia, where thousands of Soviet citizens were massacred and buried in the first half of the twentieth century as part of the Red Terror. In all, around 4,500 people are thought to be buried there.

== Location ==
The forest is located within the Rzhevskij Poligon (Ржевский полигон - Rzhev firing range), where up to 30,000 persons are thought to have been shot during the Red Terror which took place from 1918 into the 1920s. Among those murdered was the poet Nikolay Gumilev. The bodies in Kovalevsky Forest were rediscovered by the human rights charity Memorial in 2002.

== Museum ==
Memorial is currently trying to raise funds to build a museum to commemorate those who died there at the site. In 2009 Russian President Dmitry Medvedev indicated that he supported the building of a museum to the memory of those killed in Kovalevsky Forest, but as of November 2010, no move has been made by the government or local authorities to provide funds for such a museum.
