= Thengana =

Thengana thenganal
- Village
- Location in Kerala, India Thengana (India)
- Coordinates: 9.475°N 76.575°E
- Country: India
- State: Kerala
- District: Kottayam
- Elevation: 27 m (89 ft)

Languages
  - Official: Malayalam, English
- Time zone: UTC+5:30 (IST)

Thengana is a town in the Kottayam district Kerala state in India, located five kilometers from Changanassery.

== Sree Mahadevar Temple, Thengana ==
- This is one of the famous Shiva Temples in Kerala, which is described in the ancient books written in the 14th century AD. Unnuneeli Sandesam is among the oldest literary works in Malayalam language and This "Sandesa Kavyam" is a message written in poetry, on the lines of the famous "Megh Dhoot" of Kalidasa. In the case of this work, it is a message written by a lover to his lady-love staying at a far-off place. The message is therefore written as if it is sent through a messenger, when transport and communications were very limited in Kerala.
- The messenger journey starts in Thiruvananthapuram the capital of the Venad (Travancore) Kingdom of that day, and ends at Kaduthuruthy a port town then. What amazes readers today is the fact that Kaduthuruthy is no longer a port town, as the sea receded several miles down apparently following a tsunami in 1341. Also, some of the land and water bodies mentioned in the poem are not to be seen now. It describes the messenger taken rest at the Sree Mahadevar Temple, Thengana on his way to a port town.

== Etymology ==
- Some people say that the name Changanassery is derived from ‘Thenganamsserry’ which is the name of the place ‘Thengana’ which is found in the suburbs of Changanasserry

.
