= Ushakovsky Bridge =

Bascule bridge in St Peterburg, Russia

Ushakovsky Bridge Ушаковский мост
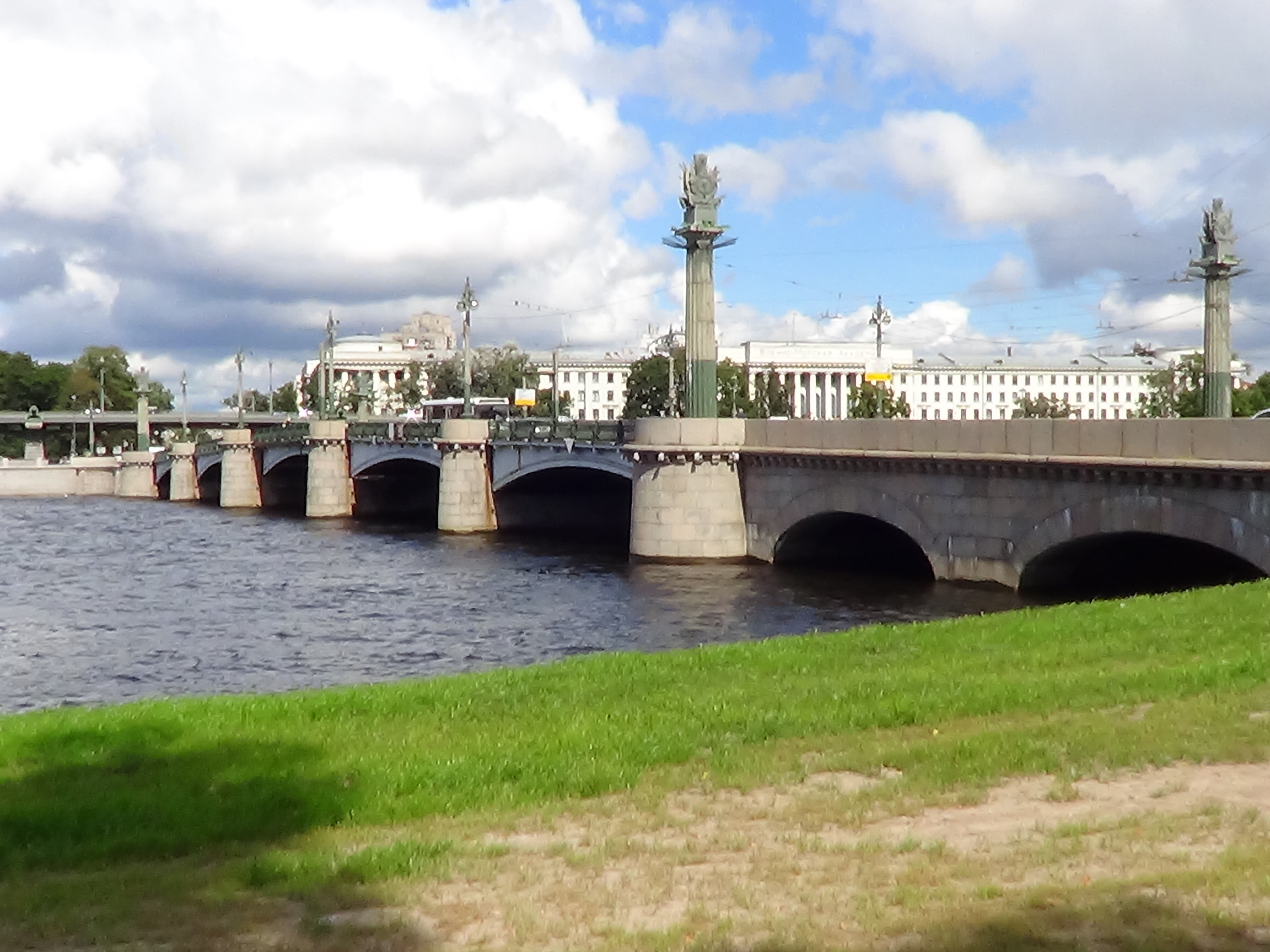
- Coordinates: 59.9827°N 30.3001°E
- Crosses: Bolshaya Nevka River
- Locale: Saint Petersburg
- Official name: Ushakovsky Bridge
- Other name: Stroganovsky Bridge
- Named for: Admiral Fyodor Ushakov
- Maintained by: Mostotrest Saint Petersburg bridge maintenance trust
- Website: en.mostotrest-spb.ru/bridges/ushakovskij

Characteristics
- Material: Concrete, steel
- Total length: 254.8 metres (836.0 ft)
- Width: 27 metres (88.6 ft)

History
- Architect: P. A. Areshev; V. S. Vasilkovsky
- Engineering design by: V. V. Demchenko; B. B. Levin
- Construction end: 1955

Location
- Interactive map of Ushakovsky Bridge

Ushakovsky Bridge (Russian: Ушаковский мост "Ushakov's Bridge") (previously known as Stroganovsky Bridge (Russian: Строгановский мост "Stroganov's Bridge")) is a bridge spanning the Bolshaya Nevka River in Saint Petersburg, Russia named for Admiral Fyodor Ushakov. Originally built in 1786 as a floating pontoon bridge, the bridge was rebuilt between 1847 and 1853 as a multi-span wooden bridge. The bridge was refitted in 1906, 1911, and 1935. The current version of the bridge was constructed between 1953 and 1955. The bridge currently contains 11 spans with the central span being a double-leaf rolling lift. The other spans are bridged over with continuous beams. The bridge's footing is faced with granite. The bridge is 254.8 metres (836.0 ft) long with approaches and 27 metres (88.6 ft) wide.

== See also ==
- List of bridges in Saint Petersburg
