= Perumpanachy =

Uploaded Ajo Kunnumpuram perumpanachy
- town
- Location in Kerala, India Uploaded Ajo Kunnumpuram perumpanachy (India)
- Coordinates: 9°30′0″N 76°38′0″E
- Country: India
- State: Kerala
- District: Kottayam

Languages
  - Official: Malayalam, English
- Time zone: UTC+5:30 (IST)
- Vehicle registration: KL-33

Perumpanachy is a village in Kottayam district of Kerala state in India. Perumpanachy falls under Madapally Panchayat and Chanaganacherry Thaluk. The village is situated 6 km away from Changanassery. The greenish landscape includes rubber plantation, paddy fields, coconut trees, pepper and a wide variety of plants and trees.

== Religious centers ==
- St. Antony's Syro-Malabar Forane Church, Kurumpanadam a Catholic church built in the 18th century about one half kilometer away from Perumpanachy.
- Madapally Bhagavathi (Goddess) Temple
- There is a mosque nearby to Perumpanachy (at Thengana).

== Banks ==
- Madapally Service Co-operative Bank Ltd. No. 160: established in 1920, head office and main branch
- Kottayam District Co-operative Bank Ltd., Perumpanachy Branch

== Fertilizer Depots ==
- Madapally Service Co-operative Bank fertilizer depot: all organic and chemical fertilizers available

== Schools ==
- St.Peter's Higher Secondary School, Kurumpanadom
- Govt. L P School, Perumpanachy
- C S U P School, Madappally
- St. Antonys L P School, Kurumpanadom
- St. Joseph English Medium School, Kurumpanadom
