= Sergey Gorodetsky =

Russian poet (1884–1967)

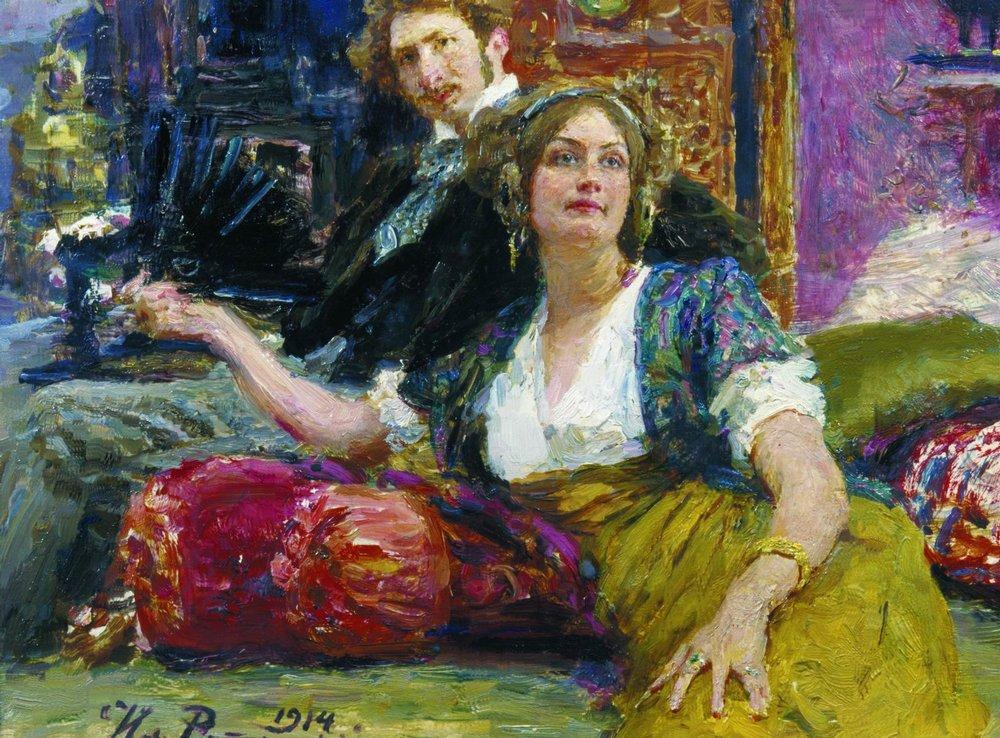
Sergey Gorodetsky and his wife. Portrait by Ilya Repin (1914)

Sergey Mitrofanovich Gorodetsky (Russian: Серге́й Митрофа́нович Городе́цкий, IPA: [sʲɪrˈɡʲej mʲɪtrɐˈfanəvʲɪdʑ ɡərɐˈdʲetskʲɪj]; 17 January [O.S. 5 January] 1884 – June 8, 1967) was a Russian poet. He was one of the founders (together with Nikolay Gumilev) of "Guild of Poets" (Цех поэтов). He was born in Saint Petersburg, and died in Obninsk.

Gorodetsky entered the literary scene as a Symbolist, developing friendships with Alexander Blok, Vyacheslav Ivanov, and Valery Briusov. Following his brief stint with Symbolists, Gorodetsky began to associate with younger poets, forming the Acmeist group with Nikolai Gumilev, Anna Akhmatova, and Osip Mandelshtam. Subsequently, abandoning yet another group, he welcomed the Bolshevik revolution as a Soviet poet.
