= Sergey Makovsky =

Russian Empire poet and art critic (1877–1962)

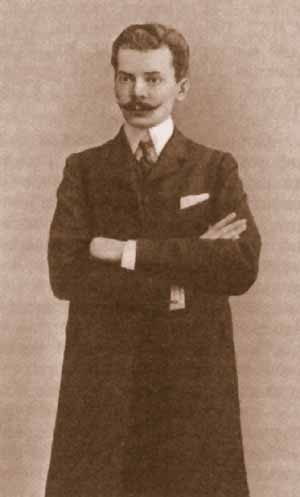
Sergéi Konstantínovich Makovski.

Sergey Konstantinovich Makovsky (Russian: Серге́й Константинович Маковский; 1877–1962) was a Russian Empire poet, art critic, and organiser of many exhibitions of modern art.

Makovsky was the son of the painter Konstantin Makovsky.

Makovsky became a leader of a Russian Renaissance in art, organising exhibitions of modern art and writing for several periodicals about new movements in the visual arts, architecture and poetry. From 1909 to 1917 he edited and published the Apollon arts magazine in Saint Petersburg. He also wrote about the significance of Russian Christian icons and in 1914 began a periodical on this subject.

After the Bolshevik seizure of power in Russia, Makovsky went into exile. He continued to publish in Russian his poems and studies of art. In 1955, Makovsky published in Russian a memoir Portraits of contemporaries.

== Publications ==
- Makovsky, Sergey K. (2000). Портреты современников (in Russian). Moscow: Agraf. ISBN 5-7784-0099-3.
