= Georgy Fedotov =

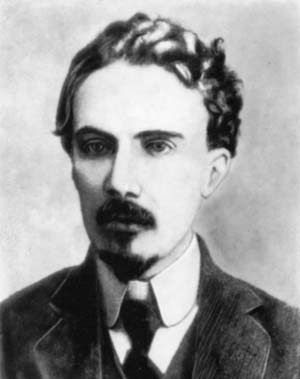
- Born: Georgy Petrovich Fedotov; October 1, 1886; Saratov, Russian Empire
- Died: September 1, 1951 (aged 64); New York City, United States
- Occupations: historian, religious philosopher, theologian
- Writing career
- Genre: religious philosophy

Georgy Petrovich Fedotov (Russian: Гео́ргий Петро́вич Федо́тов, October 1 (13) 1886, Saratov, Russian Empire, – September 1, 1951, New York, US) was a Russian religious philosopher, historian, essayist, author of many books on Orthodox culture, regarded by some as a founder of Russian "theological culturology". Fedotov left Soviet Russia under duress for France in 1925, then in 1939 emigrated to the United States where he taught at St. Vladimir Orthodox Seminary, New York, and continued publishing books up until his death in 1951.

He was a Guggenheim Fellow for the academic year 1946–1947.

== Works ==
- Святой Филипп митрополит Московский. — Paris: Ymca-press, 1928. — 224 с.
- Святые древней Руси (X—XVII ст.) — Paris: Ymca press, 1931. — 260 с.
- The Russian Religious Mind, New York, Harper & Brother, 1946
- A Treasury of Russian Spirituality, [comp.& ed.], London, Sheed & Ward, 1950
- St. Filipp, Metropolitan of Moscow : encounter with Ivan the Terrible, Belmont, Mass. : Nordland Pub. Co. 1978
