= Acmeist poetry =

School of poetry in early 20th-century Russia

Acmeism, or the Guild of Poets, was a modernist transient poetic school, which emerged c. 1911 or in 1912 in Russia under the leadership of Nikolay Gumilev and Sergei Gorodetsky. Their ideals were compactness of form and clarity of expression. The term was coined after the Greek word ἀκμή (akmē), i.e., "the best age of man".

== History ==
The acmeist mood was first announced by Mikhail Kuzmin in his 1910 essay "Concerning Beautiful Clarity". The acmeists contrasted the ideal of Apollonian clarity (hence the name of their journal, Apollon) to "Dionysian frenzy" propagated by the Russian symbolist poets like Bely and Vyacheslav Ivanov. To the Symbolists' preoccupation with "intimations through symbols" they preferred "direct expression through images".

In his later manifesto "The Morning of Acmeism" (1913), Osip Mandelstam defined the movement as "a yearning for world culture". As a "neo-classical form of modernism", which essentialized "poetic craft and cultural continuity", the Guild of Poets placed Alexander Pope, Théophile Gautier, Rudyard Kipling, Innokentiy Annensky, and the Parnassian poets among their predecessors.

== Major poets ==
Major poets in this school include Osip Mandelstam, Nikolay Gumilev, Mikhail Kuzmin, Anna Akhmatova, and Georgiy Ivanov. The group originally met in The Stray Dog Cafe, St. Petersburg, then a celebrated meeting place for artists and writers. Mandelstam's collection of poems Stone (1912) is considered the movement's finest accomplishment.

== Variations in style ==
Amongst the major acmeist poets, each interpreted acmeism in a different stylistic light, from Akhmatova's intimate poems on topics of love and relationships to Gumilev's narrative verse.

== See also ==
- Tagantsev conspiracy
- Imaginism
- Imagism
- Symbolism (arts)
