= Nikolai Gumilev =

Russian poet and literary critic (1886–1921)

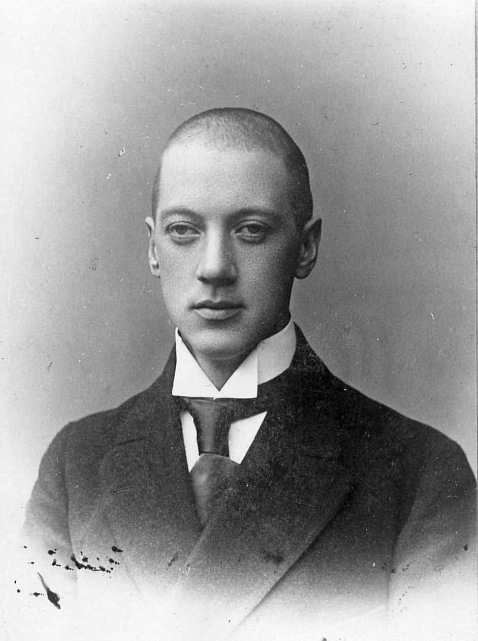
Gumilev during his senior years in gymnasium

Nikolai Stepanovich Gumilev (also Gumilyov; Russian: Николай Степанович Гумилёв, IPA: [nʲɪkɐˈlaj sʲtʲɪˈpanəvʲɪtɕ ɡʊmʲɪˈlʲɵf]; 15 April [O.S. 3 April] 1886 – August 26, 1921) was a Russian poet, literary critic, traveler, and military officer. He was a co-founder of the Acmeist movement. He was the husband of Anna Akhmatova and the father of Lev Gumilev. Nikolai Gumilev was arrested and executed by the Cheka, the secret Soviet police force, in 1921.

== Early life and poems ==
Nikolay Gumilev was born in the town of Kronstadt on Kotlin Island, into the family of Stepan Yakovlevich Gumilev (1836–1910), a naval physician, and Anna Ivanovna L'vova (1854–1942). His childhood nickname was "Montigomo", the Hawk's Claw. He studied at the gymnasium of Tsarskoye Selo, where the Symbolist poet Innokenty Annensky was his teacher. Later, Gumilev admitted that it was Annensky's influence that turned his mind to writing poetry. He spent some of his youth in Tbilisi, Georgia attending the First Gymnasium.

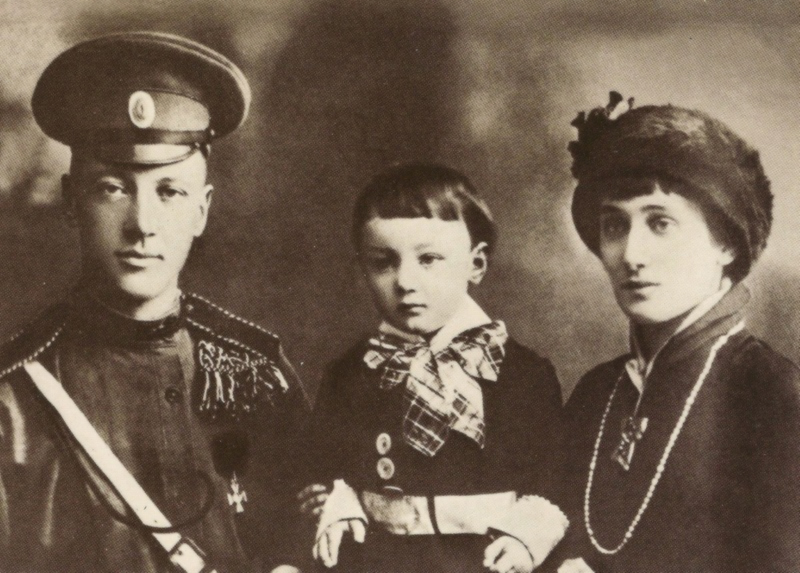
Nikolay Gumilev, Anna Akhmatova and their son Lev Gumilev, 1913

His first poem, I Ran from Cities into Woods (Я в лес бежал из городов), was published on September 8, 1902, in the newspaper Tifliski Listok. In 1905 he published his first collection of poetry entitled Conquistadors' Way. It was composed of poems on the most exotic subjects imaginable, from Lake Chad giraffes to Caracalla's crocodiles. Although Gumilev was proud of the collection, most critics found his technique sloppy; later he would refer to this publication as apprentice's work.

From 1907 on, Nikolai Gumilev traveled extensively throughout Europe, most notably in Italy and France. In 1908 his new collection Romantic Flowers appeared. While in Paris, he published the literary magazine Sirius, but only three issues were produced. Upon returning to Russia, he edited and contributed to the artistic periodical Apollon. During this period, he fell in love with a non-existent woman Cherubina de Gabriak. It turned out that Cherubina de Gabriak was the literary pseudonym for two people: Elisaveta Ivanovna Dmitrieva and Maximilian Voloshin. On November 22, 1909, he had a duel with Voloshin over the affair.

Gumilev married Anna Akhmatova on April 25, 1910. He dedicated some of his poems to her. On September 18, 1912, their child Lev was born. He would eventually become an influential and controversial historian.

== Travel to Africa ==
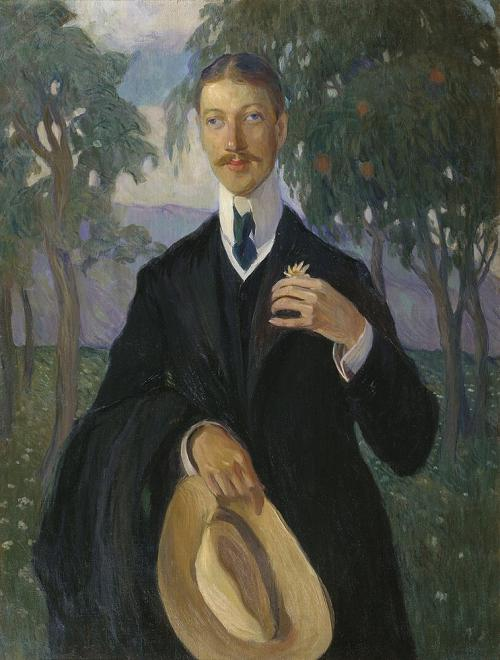
Portrait of Gumilev with African Background by Olga Della-Vos-Kardovskaya, 1909

Like Flaubert and Rimbaud before him, but inspired by exploits of Alexander Bulatovich and Nikolay Leontiev, Gumilev was fascinated with Africa and travelled there almost every year. He explored, sporadically hunted lions, and even contributed to the development of Ethiopia, eventually donating a large collection of African artifacts to the Museum of Anthropology and Ethnography in Saint Petersburg. His landmark publication, The Tent (1921), collected his best poems on African themes, one of them "Giraffe".

== Guild of Poets ==
In 1910, Gumilev fell under the spell of the Russian Symbolist poet and philosopher Vyacheslav Ivanov and absorbed his views on poetry at the evenings held by Ivanov in his celebrated "Turreted House". His wife Akhmatova accompanied him to Ivanov's parties as well.

Dissatisfied with the vague mysticism of Russian Symbolism, then prevalent in the Russian poetry, Gumilev and Sergei Gorodetsky established the so-called Guild of Poets, which was modeled after medieval guilds of Western Europe. They advocated a view that poetry needs craftsmanship just like architecture needs it. Writing a good poem they compared to building a cathedral. To illustrate their ideals, Gumilev published two collections, The Pearls in 1910 and the Alien Sky in 1912. It was Osip Mandelstam, however, who produced the movement's most distinctive and durable monument, the collection of poems entitled Stone (1912).

According to the principles of acmeism (as the movement came to be dubbed by art historians), every person, irrespective of his talent, may learn to produce high-quality poems if only he follows the guild's masters, i.e., Gumilev and Gorodetsky. Their own model was Théophile Gautier, and they borrowed much of their basic tenets from the French Parnasse. Such a program, combined with colourful and exotic subject matter of Gumilev's poems, attracted to the Guild a large number of adolescents. Several major poets, notably Georgy Ivanov and Vladimir Nabokov, passed the school of Gumilev, albeit informally.

== War experience ==
When World War I started, Gumilev hastened to Russia and enthusiastically joined a corps of elite cavalry. He fought in battles in East Prussia and Macedonia. For his bravery he was invested with two St. George crosses (December 24, 1914 and January 5, 1915).

His war poems were assembled in the collection The Quiver (1916). In 1916 he wrote a verse play, Gondla, which was published the following year; set in ninth-century Iceland, torn between its native paganism and Irish Christianity, it is also clearly autobiographical, Gumilev putting much of himself into the hero Gondla (an Irishman chosen as king but rejected by the jarls, he kills himself to ensure the triumph of Christianity) and basing Gondla's wild bride Lera on Gumilev's wife Akhmatova (or maybe Larissa Reissner). The play was performed in Rostov na Donu in 1920.

During the Russian Revolution, Gumilev served in the Russian Expeditionary Force in France. Despite advice to the contrary, he rapidly returned to Petrograd. There he published several new collections, Tabernacle and Bonfire, and finally divorced Akhmatova (August 5, 1918), whom he had left for another woman several years prior. The following year he married Anna Engelhardt, a noblewoman and daughter of a well-known historian.

== Execution ==
In 1920 Gumilev co-founded the All-Russia Union of Writers. He made no secret of his anti-communist views. He also made the Sign of the Cross in public and didn't care to hide his contempt for "half-literate Bolsheviks". On August 3, 1921, he was arrested by the Cheka on charges of participation in a nonexistent monarchist conspiracy known as the "Petrograd military organization". On August 24, the Petrograd Cheka decreed execution of 61 participants of the case, including Nikolay Gumilev. They were shot on August 26 in the Kovalevsky Forest (the actual date was established only in 2014; previously it was thought he died on August 25). Maxim Gorky, his friend and fellow writer, hurried to Moscow and appealed to Lenin, but was unable to save Gumilev.

== Legacy ==
Gumilev's execution placed a stigma on Akhmatova and on their son, Lev. Lev was arrested later in the purges of the 1930s and spent almost two decades in a gulag.

Despite Gumilev's execution, Gondla was again performed in Petrograd in January 1922: "The play, despite its crowd scenes being enacted on a tiny stage, was a major success. Yet when the Petrograd audience called for the author, who was now officially an executed counter-revolutionary traitor, the play was removed from the repertoire and the theatre disbanded."

In February 1934, as they walked along a Moscow street, Osip Mandelstam quoted Gondla's words "I am ready to die" to Akhmatova, and she repeated them in her "Poem without a Hero".

== Cultural influence ==
Although banned in the Soviet times, Gumilev was loved for his adolescent longing for travel and giraffes and hippos, for his dreams of a fifteen-year-old captain" His "The Tram That Lost Its Way" is considered one of the greatest poems of the 20th century.

- The Russian progressive rock band Little Tragedies used the poetry of Gumilev in many of their songs, and had four albums which were entirely based on Gumilev's poetry (The Sun of the Spirit, Porcelain Pavilion, Return, Cross).
- In 2016 an English translation of his verse drama Gondla was published by the Irish poet and diplomat Philip McDonagh and a production toured in Ireland.
- In 2025, Russian director Alexey Yurgaitis made the documentary film "The Gumilyov Mysteries"

== See also ==
- Silver Age of Russian Poetry
- 4556 Gumilyov, an asteroid named after him
- List of famous duels

=== Russian people in Ethiopia ===
- Alexander Bulatovich
- Leonid Artamonov
- Nikolay Leontiev
