= Natalia Varbanets =

Soviet bibliographer and medievalist

- Born: October 24, 1916; Odessa, Russian Empire
- Died: February 17, 1987 (aged 70); Leningrad, Soviet Union
- Education: Philological Faculty of Leningrad State University; N. K. Krupskaya Library Institute
- Occupation: Bibliographer
- Employer: State Public Library (1938–1982, with interruptions)
- Known for: Researcher of incunabula and the work of Johannes Gutenberg
- Awards: Order of the Patriotic War (2nd class)

Natalia Vasilyevna Varbanets (24 October 1916; Odessa – 17 February 1987; Leningrad) was a Soviet bibliographer and medievalist. She worked at the National Library of Russia from 1938 to 1982 (with interruptions). She authored more than thirty scientific works, including the first Russian-language monograph on Johannes Gutenberg (1980). She is known for her professional and personal relationships with historians V. S. Liublinsky and L. N. Gumilev. She also associated with poet Anna Akhmatova and pianist Maria Yudina, and left memoirs about the latter.

Natalia Varbanets came from the family of an engineer –ethnical Croat– on her mother's side, she belonged to the Rosset family. She spent her entire conscious life in Leningrad. In the 1930s, she graduated from the Higher Foreign Language Courses, and starting in 1934, she began working in various Leningrad libraries. Thanks to her acquaintance and long-term personal relationship with V. Liublinsky, in 1938 she was hired by the State Public Library. She completed her secondary education with distinction and was admitted without exams to the Leningrad State University. In 1941, she enrolled in nursing courses; subsequently, she was drafted into the Red Army (demobilized in December 1942) and until 1945 worked in a hospital as a civilian employee. She was awarded medals. From 1947–1949, she closely associated with L. N. Gumilev (until his arrest). In 1954–1956, they resumed correspondence, with more than fifty letters preserved. During Lev Gumilev's imprisonment, Varbanets maintained contact with his mother Anna Akhmatova. According to one version, Akhmatova, believing Varbanets to be an informant for the competent authorities, turned Gumilev against her, leading to a painful breakup. The adoptive daughter and heir to N. Varbanets' archive was the theater artist M. Kozyreva – goddaughter of Lev Gumilev; her archive preserves many documents from those years, as well as several watercolors in a primitive style, reflecting the moods and feelings of N. Varbanets in the early 1950s.

After returning to the staff of the Public Library, N. Varbanets mainly worked in the rare books department, where her professional activity focused on incunabule. In 1952, she graduated by correspondence from the N. K. Krupskaya Library Institute, and in 1972 defended her dissertation there for the degree of Candidate of Philological Sciences. Based on the dissertation, in 1980 the monograph Johannes Gutenberg and the beginning of printing in Europe was published, receiving positive reviews from professional medievalists. Until the end of her life, N. Varbanets worked on compiling a catalog of early printed editions of ancient texts, begun jointly with V. Liublinsky. This catalog was published only in 2007.

== Biography ==
=== Librarian ===
The main sources for the biography of N. V. Varbanets are her personal file at the Russian National Library and the memoirs of her heiress, M. Kozyreva. Natalia Vasilyevna was born in Odessa in the family of Croatian engineer Vasily Efimovich Varbanets (1886 – after 1940) and Olga Pavlovna Russet, belonging to the Rosset family. Her parents divorced after the revolution, and she was raised by her mother, who moved to Petrograd in 1923. In 1931, she graduated from seven grades of the 17th secondary school, from where she transferred to the final cycle of the Higher State Courses of Foreign Languages, but did not take state exams. Almost her entire professional life was connected with books: in June–November 1934, Natalia worked as a librarian at the Central Park of Culture and Recreation (where she met V. Lyublinsky); in 1935–1936, she served as a librarian at the House of Engineering and Technical Workers named after Molotov; from March 1936 to November 1937, at the library of Leningrad Institute of History, Philosophy, and Linguistics.

External images
- Photos of N. V. Varbanets from the archive of M. Kozyreva and RNL
- Photo from the personal file of the State Public Library
- N. V. Varbanets at home at the piano. 1930s
- V. S. Lyublinsky in the 1930s
- N. Varbanets in the rare books department of the State Public Library. 1946
- N. Varbanets (in work coat) and M. Kozyreva in 1955
- N. Varbanets at home. 1956

Thanks to her acquaintance with V. Lyublinsky, in 1937 N. Varbanets was hired on a contract basis in the manuscript department of the National Library, and in December 1938 she was transferred to the staff. In her personnel record sheet, she indicated knowledge of French, German, and Latin languages. In 1939–1941, she studied at the adult secondary school No. 21 and the first year of the Philological Faculty of Leningrad State University, where she was admitted without exams. After the start of the Great Patriotic War, she was drafted into the Red Army, served as a nurse in Leningrad Hospital No. 1448, and survived the Siege of Leningrad. She was demobilized on 31 December 1942, worked as a civilian employee in the same hospital until 10 January 1945. She was awarded the medals "For the Defense of Leningrad" and "For Valiant Labour in the Great Patriotic War 1941–1945". Returning to work at the GPB, she participated in sorting the library collections returned from evacuation. She was then enrolled in the staff of the newly created rare books department of the GPB in 1946, where she began preparing a catalog of incunabules; the first issue was compiled in 1948 in co-authorship with V. Lyublinsky. The department was located in the "Faust's Study", across the hall from which were the collections of the library of Voltaire. G. V. Nikolskaya, who knew Varbanets earlier from the library of the House of Engineering and Technical Workers, also served in the department. In 1947–1950, Natalia Varbanets was the trade union organizer of the rare books department; in 1949, due to the arrest of department employee L. S. Gordon (his daughter Maryana settled with Natalia Vasilyevna) and the forced dismissal of V. S. Lyublinsky for three years, she was transferred to the cataloging department. A denunciation against her mentioned that Varbanets' father was exiled from Leningrad in 1935.

=== Scholar-bibliographer ===
In 1948–1952, Natalia Varbanets studied by correspondence at the Library Institute named after N. K. Krupskaya, graduating with a specialty in bibliography. She developed a method for constructing a catalog of incunabule and ways of describing them, and prepared the first "Instructions for Cataloging Incunabules" in the USSR. She participated in the preparation of the catalog of the library of Voltaire, published in 1961. In 1961, N. V. Varbanets, together with other colleagues, was part of the authorial collective of the first guide to the collections of the rare books department of the GPB. The guide, printed on rotaprint in an edition of 100 copies, instantly became a bibliographic rarity. N. V. Varbanets' career progressed: in 1953, she became a bibliographer in the rare books department ("due to the appearance of a vacancy"), in 1965 – junior research associate, in 1975 – chief librarian, in 1977 – senior research associate. In 1969, the rare books department was abolished and merged with the manuscript department, which worsened the position of N. V. Varbanets, who prepared bibliographic and archaeographic references, conducted consultations, excursions, and classes with students. A significant part of her time was spent on documentary verification of collections, reconciliation, and editing of card catalogs. On 18 February 1971, N. Varbanets held an off-site meeting of the bibliophile section of the Leningrad society of collectors in the incunabule room of the GPB on the topic "At the Dawn of Book Printing".

In 1972, at the Leningrad Institute of Culture, N. V. Varbanets defended her dissertation for the degree of Candidate of Philological Sciences Johann Gutenberg and the Beginning of Book Printing in Europe, published in monograph form in 1980. This monograph made Natalia a recognized specialist in the history of early printed books. In the 1970s, she continued the work begun with V. Lyublinsky on compiling a catalog of ancient authors in 15th-century editions, and this topic was included in her work plan. Later, there were many conflicts in the library staff, in which N. Varbanets wrote disapprovingly to M. Kozyreva. Partly they were provoked by Varbanets' reluctance to hand over the manuscript of the incunabule catalog she had prepared to the library's disposal. In February 1982, Natalia Vasilyevna Varbanets was dismissed from the GPB due to reduction. By order of the Minister of Defense dated 6 April 1985, as a defender of Leningrad during the blockade, N. V. Varbanets was awarded the Order of the Patriotic War, 2nd class. She died in 1987 (on the 17th or, according to other sources, 18 February) at the age of seventy.

The obituary for N. V. Varbanets was published by the English Slavist John Simmons, who had previously paid tribute to the merits of V. S. and A. D. Lyublinsky. Simmons' obituaries appeared in the "Memorials" series; each of the eight published issues included a bibliography of the deceased scholar and his portrait; they expressed the author's personal gratitude.

== Scientific contributions ==
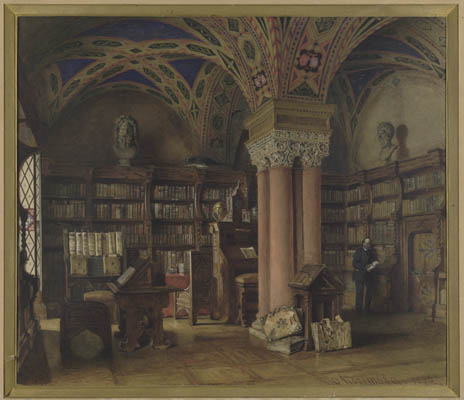
The Faust's Study — the main workplace of N. V. Varbanets at the Public Library. Painting by O. Kochetova, 1880

=== Bibliographic work ===
==== The problem of continuity between manuscripts and early printed books ====
At the Public Library, N. V. Varbanets' main work involved processing incunabule, which included their study, verification of condition and the presence of specially preserved copies, and reconciliation with the alphabetical catalog. Becoming a specialist, N. Varbanets began studying the invention of printing in Europe in a broad historical-cultural context. She was also interested in the design of the first typographic fonts, their evolution from manuscript hands, and the features of the layout of early printed books: initials, headings, rubric signs, illustrations. She substantiated the enormous importance of these questions in numerous theoretical and methodological publications of the 1960s–1970s. Through her own experience working with incunabule collections, Natalia Varbanets became convinced of the direct continuity between manuscript and early printed traditions, which was expressed in the anonymity of editions (there were printers who deliberately preserved anonymity, not indicating names in colophons, and their identity was revealed only thanks to later archival discoveries) and the colossal variety of typefaces, often determined by the hand of the manuscript from which the typesetting was carried out. The fonts of early printers were individual, as they served as an additional distinctive mark of skill: a master sought to maintain a monopoly on his own font. This was an additional opportunity for attributing editions lacking publication data. On this principle, the systematization of 15th-century fonts by printing houses was built, which allowed incunabulists to sometimes attribute even fragments of surviving editions. In a sociocultural sense, the font constituted the printer's main capital and the most labor-intensive and expensive part of the technical equipment. Thus, printers long used the same font, and by the end of the century, trade in fonts and joint use of one master's fonts by several printing houses became common. However, due to the principle of font changes when transferring to another owner (even in minor details), opportunities for discoveries arose, in particular, in the repertoire of texts relevant to their time.

==== Incunabule studies ====
A significant part of N. V. Varbanets' scientific legacy was her practical work with incunabules, which involved developing methods for handling early printed books. It was the State Public Library that was almost the only institution in the USSR at that time capable of issuing a series of catalogs and methodological guidelines. They were published in the publications of the GPB in the period 1968–1979, and the first "Inventory of incunabule[s]", intended only for a narrow circle of specialists, appeared as early as 1939 (also at the GPB). It was Natalia Vasilievna who stood at the origins of the development of methodological recommendations for working with incunabules for beginning book scholars, which combined practical instructions with the development of theoretical issues, in particular, book analysis, signs of rare editions, etc. In the 1968 collection, N. V. Varbanets published a special article on the principles and organizational structure of storing incunabules, and the principles of their scientific description ("processing"). The main feature of rare editions collections was their separation from the general library storage, since the scientific and material value of rare editions was not limited to the text itself but was determined by the entire set of features of each given edition or group of editions. This implied the subordination of all processes of working with incunabules to the principle of preservation and an individual approach to each edition, restriction of access to the edition, and preference for conservative methods of work. N. V. Varbanets also developed a special instruction for storing rare book collections, which was recognized by specialists as one of the first not only in the USSR but also in the world. This instruction states that if library rules primarily relate to the text and bibliographic data, then work with rare editions implies attention to non-textual elements of the book, including covers and bindings, illustrations, inscriptions, inserts, etc. The value of rare editions does not depend on the immediate relevance of the content, scientific apparatus, completeness and preservation of the copy, etc.

N. V. Varbanets developed a special instruction for identifying elements of value in rare editions and copies. The value of rare editions is due to their significance as historical primary sources and monuments of material and spiritual culture. The value of a specific copy may be determined by the historical value of the specific edition or even a single copy. In the latter case, the individual features of the copy were acquired either at the time of its release or in the process of circulation. Editions from historically formed libraries have special source-study significance, from which follows the special importance of preserving the traditional composition of the library. If for any reason the library is fragmented, its historical significance is most often irrecoverable. In Varbanets' instruction, the stated provisions are illustrated by the example of the 36-line Gutenberg Bible: a significant part of the fragments of this edition is found in the bindings of books published in cities close to Bamberg. Whole copies of this edition immediately after publication belonged to Bamberg owners; this means that the Bible was printed not in Mainz, as previously thought, but in Bamberg. In other words, issues of storage, determination of the value of rare copies, and the results of their book analysis are fundamentally inseparable from each other.

In N. V. Varbanets' instruction Introduction to Work with incunabules, the goals and tasks of incunabule studies as a separate discipline were defined. According to the researcher, this discipline deals with reconstructing the specific picture of 15th-century printing. Solving this task is impossible without creating a universal methodology of book analysis applicable to all editions published before 1500, which will allow resolving specific source-study problems.

==== Rare editions of the founders of Marxism-Leninism ====
When N. V. Varbanets' developments went beyond her main research interests, they could be subjected to sharp criticism. Thus, in the 1972 article "On the Study of Rare Editions of the Founders of Marxism-Leninism", the reviewer found "fantastic information" about the censorship persecutions of the first edition of V. I. Lenin's The Development of Capitalism in Russia. The method used by N. Varbanets —combining book approach with the study of documents and memoirs— was recognized as fruitful in the article by S. S. Levina and L. N. Petrova. However, Natalia's own conclusions were deemed untenable precisely. In her study, N. V. Varbanets concluded that from the first edition of V. I. Lenin's book The Development of Capitalism in Russia (1899), the censorship removed a Postscriptum (addition) to the preface. The conclusion was based on comparing two variants of this edition. The researcher assumed that a more complete variant was printed first, from which the addition was removed at the censorship's demand. However, from V. I. Lenin's correspondence with relatives, it is known that in March 1899, a copy without the addition was submitted to the censorship. This is confirmed by the announcement of the edition in the newspaper Russkie Vedomosti, which mentions the variant with the addition made by Anna I. Ulyanova at her brother's request.

Thus, conclusions obtained by the book method contradict documentary data. This happened because the book research was reduced to observations of the stitching of quires, and far-reaching conclusions were drawn from limited facts. Not all circumstances of the book's printing were taken into account, and here, as we saw, even such a detail as the timing of mail delivery from Shushenskoye to Podolsk is significant. The article does not raise the question of which of the two variants of the edition received wider distribution. <…> The unsuccessful application of the book method, of course, does not discredit the method itself but only proves that it cannot be reduced to separate fragmentary observations.

=== Catalogs ===
==== Voltaire's Library ====
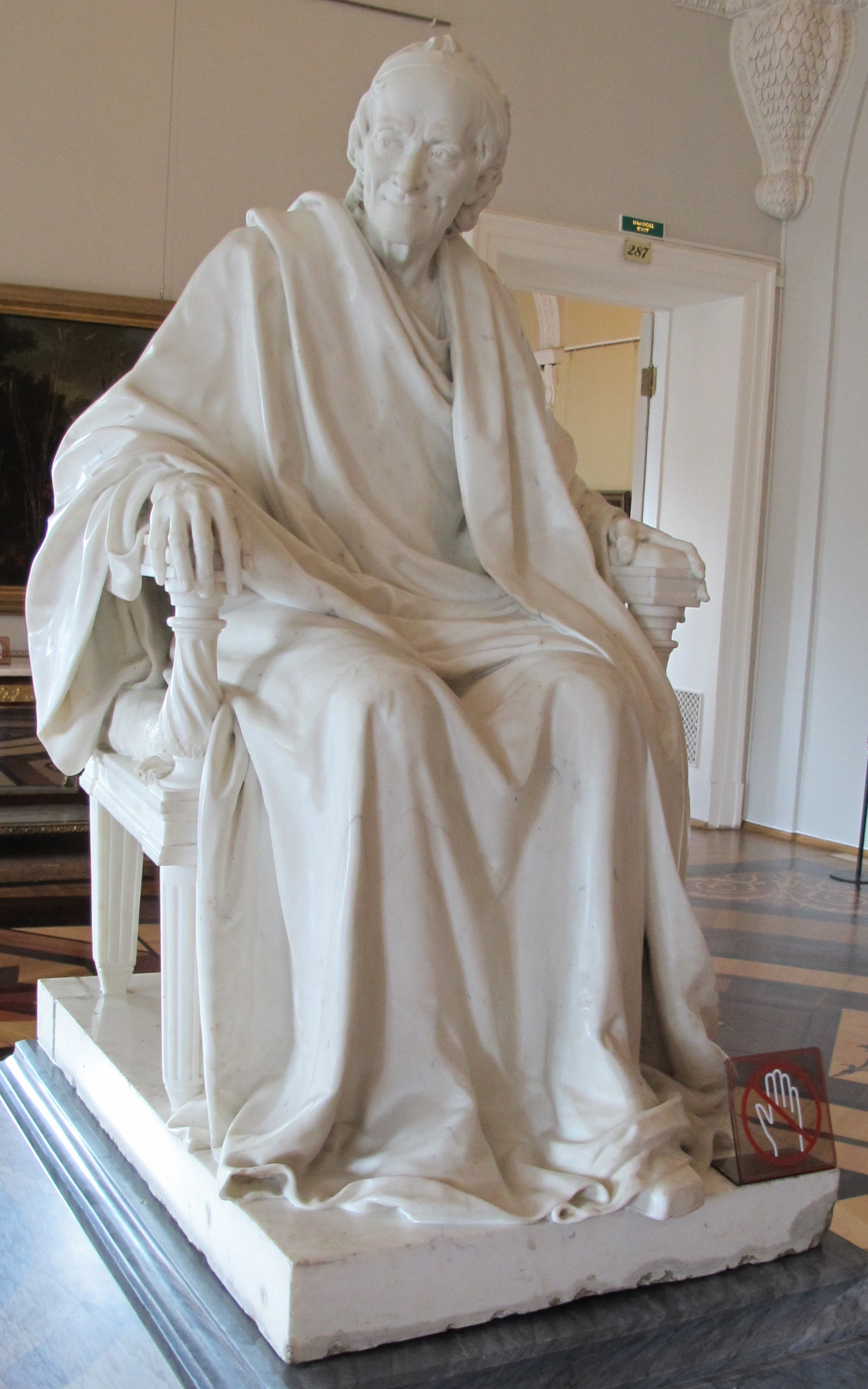
Jean-Antoine Houdon. Seated Voltaire. Marble, 1781. State Hermitage Museum. A bronze copy of this sculpture is placed in the storage of Voltaire's library at the RNB

Already in the 19th century, in connection with the transfer to the Public Library of the collections of Voltaire's personal library, its source-study potential was assessed. E. L. Radlov laid the foundations for studying the philosopher's work through his reader's marginalia in books. In 1930, on his own initiative, V. S. Lyublinsky began working with the Voltaire library fund, which was formalized in 1931. It was in the 1930s that the question arose of systematically describing the collections of Voltaire's library and creating its catalog, the principles of which were proposed by M. L. Lozinsky, who became the keeper of the library for a short time; V. Lyublinsky was removed from this work. Since the publication of the catalog was included in the GPB's work plan, due to its non-fulfillment in 1937, V. S. Lyublinsky was involved in working on Voltaire's marginalia under contract, but compiling the catalog was not part of his official duties. V. S. Lyublinsky was again included in the working group for the catalog only in 1944, in connection with the celebration of Voltaire's 250th anniversary; at the evening in his memory at the Writers' House (November 22), Vladimir Sergeevich spoke about the content of the library.

After the return of the GPB funds from evacuation in 1945, it became possible to compare the catalog descriptions with the editions themselves; L. S. Gordon was involved in this work, and from 1946 he was enrolled in the library staff. After the creation in 1946 of the Rare Book Department under the leadership of V. S. Lyublinsky, Voltaire's library became part of its collections. In this year, the principles for publishing Voltaire's marginalia were developed; this research was personally carried out by L. S. Gordon and V. S. Lyublinsky: they created the methodology for compiling and organizing the material of future thematic issues. Finally, the original manuscript of the Voltaire library catalog, amounting to 80 printer's sheets, was finally edited in 1947. The publication failed for several reasons: first, high-quality execution of the most complex edition was technically possible only in Germany or Estonia; second, in 1949 L. S. Gordon was arrested, and V. S. Lyublinsky was forced to resign from the GPB "for health reasons" and no longer held leadership positions in the library, although he later worked under contracts. Only in 1960 did the Academy of Sciences publishing house decide to publish the catalog of Voltaire's library, with V. S. Lyublinsky appointed as chief editor. By that time, the main part of the work on revising the catalog principles was performed by N. V. Varbanets, who also wrote the preface to the publication. The editing was done by T. N. Kopreeva, then head of the Rare Book Department, to whom N. Varbanets was subordinate. In Lyublinsky's correspondence, a conflict is mentioned between N. V. Varbanets and the leadership due to her rejection of corrections in the catalog proofs, which threatened her with a large fine. The revised catalog was published in 1961.

In the published review of the edition, the work of N. V. Varbanets and her introductory article were mentioned separately and received high praise. At the same time, S. Ya. Karp noted that N. V. Varbanets, attributing books from Voltaire's library in the GPB collections, significantly underestimated their number. This became clear after the discovery of a list by Voltaire's friend A. Rie, from whom many English books entered the library fund.

After submitting the Voltaire library catalog for printing, work resumed on preparing the corpus of his reader's marginalia for publication. It was carried out by employees of the Rare Book Department T. N. Kopreeva, N. V. Varbanets, and L. L. Albina with constant consultations from V. S. Lyublinsky, A. D. Lyublinskaya, and L. S. Gordon. In 1967, T. Kopreeva turned to colleagues from the GDR to ensure the printing base for the edition. Joint efforts led in 1969 to the signing of an agreement between the Public Library and the publishing house Akademie-Verlag in Berlin for the multi-volume publication Corpus of Voltaire's Reader's Marginalia. However, after a change in the department leadership (T. P. Voronova became head), Natalia Vasilievna did not participate in the edition. The first volume was published in 1979, and four more were published by 1994.

==== "Ancient authors in 15th-century editions" ====
External image
- Natalia Varbanets among colleagues during the sorting of funds returned from evacuation at the GPB in November 1945

Simultaneously with work on the Voltaire library catalog and the corpus of his marginalia, V. S. Lyublinsky planned to compile a complete catalog of the Public Library's incunabule. Vladimir Sergeevich planned to group it into eight categories, each corresponding to a separate issue. The first was to include ancient authors — Greek and Latin up to the 6th century, although theologians' works were to enter the seventh issue. Lyublinsky involved N. V. Varbanets in compiling a draft of the first issue. After a break due to the war and expansion of annotations based on comments by I. M. Tronsky and M. A. Gukovsky, in 1948 the book was included in the GPB publishing plan. The publication did not take place for the same reasons as the failure of the Voltaire library catalog publication. After V. Lyublinsky's dismissal, two bound copies of the 442-page typescript remained in the auxiliary fund of the Rare Book Department. They are preceded by a description of the tasks and features of the catalog compilation principles and a historical-book essay signed by both V. Lyublinsky and N. Varbanets.

On the initiative of both co-authors, in 1965 the question of publishing the GPB incunabule catalog was raised again. It was decided to rework the manuscript taking into account new data. This work was included in N. V. Varbanets' scientific plan; one of the manuscripts was unbound and given to her disposal. The principles of revision and addition of the catalog became the basis for a number of N. Varbanets' publications and were reflected in the new preface. After the liquidation of the Rare Book Department, Natalia Vasilievna was able to complete the catalog revision work only by the end of 1973. This work was accompanied by serious conflicts, as the new leadership demanded the return of the typescript, and after her refusal in 1971, N. V. Varbanets was reprimanded. Nevertheless, the work was completed. In the 1973 version, the catalog included 482 descriptions and was twice the volume of the previous version. The introductory article by the late V. S. Lyublinsky from the 1948 version was preserved, and N. V. Varbanets wrote a General Introduction.

In July 1974, a general discussion took place at the scientific-methodological council of the Manuscripts and Rare Books Department. Opinions were divided: library staff spoke against N. V. Varbanets, accusing her of having described only a tenth of the GPB incunabule over all the past time; it was also said that the selection was made according to the principles of the 1930s and the catalog required major revision. N. V. Varbanets' General Introduction, "written in a complicated and sometimes confusing way", was unanimously criticized. On the contrary, all external reviewers — M. P. Alekseev, A. Kh. Gorfunkel, and L. I. Kiseleva — highly evaluated the work done. Academician M. P. Alekseev called Varbanets' work "thorough" and especially appreciated the novelty of the approach to describing incunabule, thanks to which the catalog is a valuable source for studying ancient philology and Renaissance culture. The codicologist and archaeographer L. Kiseleva also emphasized the thoroughness of the analysis of the composition, prefaces, afterwords, dedications, and colophons of the GPB incunabule fund, which allowed N. Varbanets to re-present the range of ancient texts current in the 15th century. The "General Index" was particularly highlighted, in which N. Varbanets included names of people somehow connected with 15th-century editions, and the conclusion was made: "The catalog is made at a high professional level". An extremely detailed review was given by A. Kh. Gorfunkel, a specialist in early printed editions. He also noted the innovativeness of the approach and the extremely high scientific and book level of the work. The contribution of N. V. Varbanets was highlighted, who managed to trace the fate of individual editions, clarify the distribution of some editions by volumes, make a number of typographic observations, and even give new datings. As a result, at the repeated discussion in October 1974, all remarks were removed, and Ya. M. Borovsky was appointed editor of the edition.

The further fate of the edition, according to N. Nikolaev and I. Zvereva, repeated the situation of the late 1940s. It was decided to publish the catalog in the GDR, it was included in the plan of the publishing house Kniga for 1976, but until 1983 the work did not progress. In 1983, the publishing house decided to include the unprofitable catalog as an appendix to a facsimile edition of some incunabule, which were then in fashion and sold well. In 1978, the facsimile edition of the Kyiv Psalter was successfully sold out, and in Leipzig the Book of Hours of Louis of Orléans from the GPB collection was published. The publishing house turned to A. Kh. Gorfunkel with a request to recommend a suitable early printed edition, and he proposed several options. The same question was asked to N. V. Varbanets, who by that time had been dismissed from the GPB but had collaborated closely with the publishing house "Kniga" for many years. Correspondence with Natalia Vasilievna went on from February to April 1983; Varbanets took an uncompromising position regarding possible encroachments on her copyright. Probably, she feared being removed from the edition as not being on the library staff, which follows from her informal correspondence. In the summer of 1983, the GPB leadership agreed to publish the "Catalog" as an appendix to the facsimile of the Cologne edition of the Comedies of Publius Terentius Afer. The publishing house commissioned N. Varbanets a book article for the combined edition, which was ready by the end of 1984: "The Cologne Edition of Terence's Comedies from the Early 1470s in the 15th-Century Printed Terence Tradition". The reviewers of the catalog were A. Kh. Gorfunkel and I. V. Pozdeeva.

Due to various circumstances, the book was not published in the 1980s. Natalia Vasilievna did not leave the last version of the manuscript at the publishing house. Only in 2004 did M. L. Kozyreva transfer her father's archive to the RNB, and the complete catalog manuscript (with library cipher and signatures of the GPB director, the publishing house, and the compiler N. Varbanets herself) was found in the collection of Kirill Alekseevich Kozyrev. In the same year, the Russian National Library recreated the Rare Book Department as a separate structural unit. Finally, in 2007, Ancient Authors in 15th-Century Editions was published.

==== Cataloging of Slavic incunabule ====
In the early 1960s, N. V. Varbanets was involved in the cataloging of Slavic incunabule, and at least one of her publications was dedicated to this topic (co-authored with V. I. Lukianenko). In her speech at the IV International Congress of Slavists in 1962, Natalia Vasilievna reported on considerations for compiling a consolidated catalog of Slavic incunabule, the basis of which should be the principle of the repertoire of fonts and textual decorations. This was especially important in conditions where, within the framework of an international project, direct comparison of editions was not always possible. N. Varbanets particularly raised the question of what should be considered a "Slavic edition". Existing catalogs at that time used the language principle (editions in Czech were well described) or the script principle — Cyrillic and Glagolitic separately. The problem was that books were printed in Slavic countries in different languages and different fonts, especially Latin; moreover, books in Slavic languages were printed in various Western European countries for Slavic consumers. Thus, the early printer Schoeffer in Mainz printed liturgical books for Kraków and Wrocław. Works by Slavic authors in the international medieval Latin language, as well as peripheral editions in the Romanian language (including in so-called "Moldovan") typeset in Cyrillic, posed difficulties for the future catalog. In 1979, a description of Montenegrin Cyrillic incunabule from the 1490s was published in Serbian in Cetinje, co-authored with V. I. Lukianenko.

=== Johann Gutenberg and the Beginning of Printing in Europe ===
The largest research project of N. V. Varbanets, dedicated to Johannes Gutenberg, began under the guidance of V. S. Lyublinsky, who, despite his illness, managed to read the draft dissertation and give his last advice. According to S. Belyakov, the monograph published in 1980 by Varbanets to some extent served as a "mirror of the soul" of Natalia Vasilievna. Almost half of the first chapter was devoted to medieval heresies, and in the final chapter, it was suggested that Gutenberg was an unorthodox Christian enlightener, "a monk in the world". This apparently manifested the strong influence of V. Lyublinsky, who in the 1920s was a member of the religious-philosophical society of medievalists, where they studied and developed the worldview of medieval Cathars, and also practiced various ways of "harmonizing the personality". E. Nemirovsky, highly evaluating Natalia Vasilievna's work, lamented that the book lacks a reference apparatus (the same was noted already in the 21st century by T. Dolgodrova). This was compensated by the researcher's freedom from schemes and stereotypes of Western Gutenberg studies; Varbanets' monograph represented a truly independent "view from the outside". At the same time, N. Varbanets was not free from overly straightforward assumptions or modernization: she transferred modern ideas about copyright and patent law to the 15th century. In the review by I. E. Barenbaum of N. V. Varbanets' article on the state of the Gutenberg question, it is asserted that Natalia Vasilievna based her methodology on Marx's idea that printing was a craft invention that caused a qualitative shift in the history of world culture.

The review of the book on Gutenberg was published by writer Yuri Medvedev, based on the views and interests of an ordinary intelligent reader and library employee. He noted that N. Varbanets did not retell well-known information about Gutenberg, justifying the subtitle "An Attempt at a New Reading of the Material". Next, the question is analyzed why the printed book was born in the medieval era associated with barbarism and illiteracy, and not, for example, in the Roman Empire or Italy with its city-republics. On the contrary, the epochal invention was made in Germany fragmented into principalities (later this thesis was criticized by E. Nemirovsky). The reviewer noted that N. V. Varbanets, in the entire complex set of political and sociocultural reasons, did not consider any of them secondary, particularly highlighting two main directions of 15th-century written culture: "university-censorship" and "sectarian-heretical", which had at least two centuries of development experience, including infrastructure — scriptoria of different levels and types and international trade in books and writing materials. Printed products were preceded by a long process of developing and standardizing font designs, as well as the transition to paper. N. Varbanets compared the work of scribes with the activities of medieval jewelers: the nature of the work of both professions was simultaneously art and craft. The layout of 15th-century manuscript editions prepared the appearance of the layout of printed books, especially since the work of copying the text by that time had separated from the work of the artist-designer or miniaturist. Yu. Medvedev considered N. Varbanets' most important conclusion to be that the technical side of printing was rooted "in extra-book spheres of medieval culture". In particular, woodcut practically repeated the copying process and was extremely uneconomical. Only a jeweler, literate, cultured person who knew the properties of metals and alloys and possessed the technique of fine metalwork could invent the actual printing process, the core of which was the decomposition of text into standard elements — types.

Yu. Medvedev separately dwelt on N. Varbanets' reasoning about the nature of I. Gutenberg's activities. Based on the few documents of the era (including the order of the French authorities to N. Jenson to learn the secrets of the technology in Mainz from its inventor) and the typographic analysis of the 42-line Bible, N. Varbanets stated that Gutenberg was involved in the ideological struggle of his time. His task was to interest contemporaries in the possibility of multiplying the most pressing texts, and the need to produce texts in many copies by definition made him not a bookman but an enlightener. Gutenberg could belong to the secret Hussites, who prepared the masses for reading the Holy Scripture, and his activity was acceptable to all spiritual structures that considered copying books a service to human salvation. This explains Gutenberg's ruin, who invested all his own and borrowed fortune in an unprofitable business. N. Varbanets declared Gutenberg a fighter against the church's monopoly on spiritual knowledge, who achieved his goal, and this was realized by contemporaries.

In S. B. Lyublinsky's review, the fact was emphasized that N. Varbanets' monograph was the completion of a large study, as well as its conditioning by the advice and works of V. S. Lyublinsky. Of the nine chapters of the book, the first, devoted to the general characteristics of medieval spiritual life and the justification of the sociocultural necessity of inventing printing, was particularly highlighted. For attributing Gutenberg editions, the researcher had to turn to font features, since Gutenberg almost did not place colophons in his printing products. N. Varbanets substantiated a new date for the invention of movable type and identified a new group of Gutenberg editions. This logically led to the problem of the anonymity of Gutenberg editions, to which the fifth and sixth chapters are devoted. The reviewer particularly noted the aesthetic perfection of the publication, for which the publishing house "Kniga" used all its capabilities. The innovativeness of N. Varbanets' historiographical approach is also noted in 21st-century publications.

== Personal life and social circle ==
=== Personality and everyday life ===
Natalia Varbanets's mother graduated from the Poltava Institute for Noble Maidens and inculcated in her daughter the interest in culture, the ability to play the piano, and paint with watercolors. At the end of the war, Natalia Vasilyevna met M. V. Yudina and maintained friendly relations with her for many years. According to M. Kozyreva's memoirs, in the 1930s Natalia moved in bohemian circles where art served as a means of escaping reality. According to her preserved diaries, in the same years her views on life free from marital ties took shape; she frankly wrote that she was "a faithful person, but always, in principle, unfaithful as a woman". Outwardly, she was compared to Nastasya Filippovna, but any kind of turmoil and neurotic breakdowns were alien to Varbanets. She was religious, but at the same time she accepted socialist ideology, and according to M. Kozyreva, "there was a mess in her head". In 1935, her father was exiled from Leningrad, and died in captivity in the 1940s. This, according to N. Varbanets's own memoirs, was a serious psychological trauma and could also have deprived her of her job at the GPB. In correspondence from the 1960s, M. Yudina noted: although Natalia Varbanets was "terribly" talented, bright, original, always alive, ... her general tone was gloomy and somehow unenlightened.

Since the 1940s, N. V. Varbanets lived in communal apartment No. 3 in the building at No. 6 on Gangutskaya Street, where for more than ten years she shared one room with her mother (who returned from evacuation in 1946), and with M. Kozyreva, who became her adopted daughter and heiress. In one of her letters from 1966 (in connection with the death of Anna Akhmatova), Natalia Vasilyevna claimed that she kept aloof from the Leningrad intelligentsia environment, "living as in a monastery, seeing few people, some forcibly and with great disgust". An undated document from the 1970s has been preserved with a petition from the director of the GPB L. A. Shilov for the provision of separate housing to Varbanets as a war veteran. After receiving a one-room apartment on the outskirts, Natalia Vasilyevna gave it to her neighbor, and in the apartment on Gangutskaya Street, two out of three rooms became hers.

=== Marriage with Vladimir Lyublinsky ===
In the mid-1930s, the 22-year-old Natalia Varbanets met a 35-year-old scholar V. S. Lyublinsky. He involved the student in his work, and determined the scope of her scholarly pursuits and arranged for her employment at the GPB. His personal wartime diary was preserved by Natalia Vasilyevna and passed to her heirs. V. Lyublinsky was married to the medieval historian A. D. Lyublinskaya, whom, according to M. Kozyreva, Varbanets resembled outwardly. Natalia rejected Lyublinsky's idea of divorce and marriage to him. Maryana Kozyreva, in her memoirs, described that after Lyublinsky's proposal to break with his wife (during the blockade), Natalia Varbanets wrote a frank letter to Alexandra Dmitrievna and swallowed a large dose of sleeping pills. However, a large batch of wounded arrived at the hospital, and Natalia Vasilyevna was mobilized to work; the suicide attempt had no consequences. In the correspondence of the Lyublinsky spouses, Natalia Vasilyevna was mentioned more than once, but details were rarely reported. For example, it turned out that Varbanets's handwritten script imitated humanistic cursive and presented difficulty even for the professional paleographer A. D. Lyublinskaya.

According to her personal personnel record, in 1945 Varbanets married one of the patients at the hospital where she served — Vladimir Vasilyevich Grodetsky, but the marriage did not last long. According to information provided by M. Kozyreva, Grodetsky turned out to be a bigamist. In the 1949 questionnaire, Varbanets indicated her marital status as divorced. Her common-law marriage with library colleague Gleb Rusetsky in 1953–1954 also lasted extremely briefly.

Subsequently, N. Varbanets's relations with V. Lyublinsky were also uneven. In Lyublinsky's correspondence with M. Yudina, Natalia Varbanets and Alexandra Lyublinskaya are invariably mentioned together, with shared greetings sent to them, but in 1959 there was a temporary cooling, which repeated in 1966. In 1968, the situation resolved in the most dramatic way: A. D. Lyublinskaya was "released" for a long business trip to France, and V. S. Lyublinsky was struck by heart disease. Since N. V. Varbanets was not a relative, she was not allowed into the hospital; deprived of care, Vladimir Sergeyevich died on February 7, 1968.

=== Natalia Varbanets and Maria Yudina ===
N. V. Varbanets's acquaintance with M. V. Yudina occurred through the mediation of V. S. Lyublinsky, who for many years provided material support to the pianist. In 1978, while preparing the first collection in memory of Maria Veniaminovna, A. M. Kuznetsov commissioned memoirs from some of her friends, including N. V. Varbanets. They were written but not published until much later. In her memoirs, Natalia Vasilyevna noted that she first saw the pianist Yudina on February 3, 1932, and the last concert she attended (March 12, 1968) was dedicated to the memory of the recently deceased V. S. Lyublinsky, which Maria Veniaminovna announced to the audience against the rules. Their first personal meeting occurred in 1943, but not in winter, when Yudina brought a parcel from his wife to V. Lyublinsky, but in summer, during the musician's next trip to Leningrad. The acquaintance deepened in the fall of 1948, when during a Moscow business trip N. Varbanets stayed with M. Yudina and received the friendly nickname "Bima" — in honor of "some cat dear to her heart", under which she was invariably mentioned in correspondence and signed herself the same way. In M. Yudina's correspondence with various people, N. Varbanets was also mentioned multiple times (including as a "wonderful person"), and several samples of their own letters have been preserved. V. Lyublinsky played a special role in the fate of both women; it was N. Varbanets who informed Maria Veniaminovna of his death. Two days later, she arrived in Leningrad, where she "sought harmony in shared grieving". Varbanets learned of M. V. Yudina's death by chance on the day of her funeral: "...our friendship was so outside all her other life connections that no one, even those who knew about it, thought to inform me".

=== Natalia Varbanets, Anna Akhmatova, and Lev Gumilev ===
==== Before and after the arrest ====
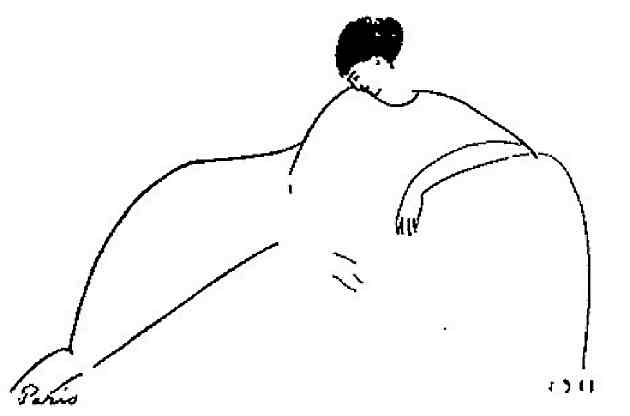
Graphic portrait of Anna Akhmatova by A. Modigliani, 1911

In late spring or early summer 1947, Natalia Varbanets met Lev Gumilev, thanks to the mediation of her colleague Vera Gnuchova. The next day, Lev Nikolayevich proposed to her, but was refused, although she started a relationship with him; they lived in two homes. This did not preclude communication with Lyublinsky, with whom Varbanets traveled to Batumi in 1948. Gumilev nicknamed him "Ptiburdukov". Natalia's intimate nickname in communication with Lev was "Ptitsa" (Bird). The "ornithological" name was originally invented by Maryana Gordon, about a year before meeting Gumilev. Lev Gumilev also used the name "Mumma", which S. Belyakov interpreted as a reference to the poem Atta Troll by H. Heine; in personal correspondence, N. Varbanets used both nicknames. For the first time, Lev Gumilev brought his mother Anna Akhmatova to N. Varbanets on Easter 1949; on November 9, she came herself with news of her son's arrest and demanded that all manuscripts of poems in the house be burned.

After Lev Gumilev's arrest in 1949, Varbanets did not attempt to correspond with him for five years, while maintaining communication with his mother Anna Akhmatova. According to M. Kozyreva's memoirs, arrests were taking place at the GPB, danger threatened V. Lyublinsky as well, to the point that Varbanets developed a special signal system: by passing the windows of Natalia or Vladimir, one could tell they were still free. At the same time, she sheltered in her room the "daughter of the people's enemy" Maryana Gordon, who became Gumilev's goddaughter, for which Natalia Vasilyevna had to give explanations to the state security organs.

More or less regular communication between the bibliographer and the poet lasted until spring 1956. Natalia Vasilyevna Varbanets recorded her meetings with A. A. Akhmatova in her diary, entries in which, according to T. Pozdnyakova, cannot be compared to the Notes of L. Chukovskaya in depth of analysis. Her entries are "hasty", Natalia Varbanets did not care about stylistic precision, probably "not counting on a possible reader". Akhmatova is referred to familiarly as "Anna", "Annushka", which combined with "timidity and admiration" in the descriptions. Anna Andreyevna used the nickname "Ptitsa"; N. Varbanets noted that conversations were usually "not at all about essentials". In the entry of January 17, 1950, there is the opinion that "Anna... is afraid that I will describe her in memoirs and behaves en conséquence. I have no such intention..." They deliberately avoided conversations about Lev Gumilev. On January 20, 1950, the diary recorded a conversation about the division in poets' lives between family and muse. A. A. Akhmatova shared the thought that she could not imagine how Pushkin would have lived if not for his duel. The conversation then shifted to Lermontov's duel and its causes. The entry concluded regretfully: "Poor my Annushka, how bored she is with me!"

==== Epistolary romance ====
External image
- Natalia Varbanets. Photo from the encyclopedia "Kniga"

After A. Akhmatova's move to Krasnoy Konnitsy Street in 1953, her meetings with Natalia continued. In Varbanets's entry of December 12, 1953, there is the statement that communicating with Anna Andreyevna "is becoming simpler", she began to behave more freely with Natalia Vasilyevna. She herself wrote that, probably, Akhmatova was convinced that "I am quite decent, that is, not a gossip, not a beggar for small gifts..." That time involved reading new translations from Qu Yuan and conversation about E. Kazakevich. Then Gleb Rusetsky — Varbanets's then-husband — came in, and the conversation shifted to drawings by A. Modigliani depicting A. Akhmatova. Meetings continued on December 30 and January 4 of the following year, 1954 (with Aleksey Batalov present). According to N. Varbanets's diary, from early 1954 she increasingly remembered Lev (called "Lyul"). After parting with G. Rusetsky, she several times reproached herself for "insufficient love" for Lev. Correspondence with the imprisoned Gumilev began in late autumn 1954, when at the request of his Siberian friend, limnologist V. Abrosov, Natalia located in Leningrad a book by Grigory Grumm-Grzhimaylo and sent it to the camp. She herself described this as "not longing for him, not love... perhaps a thirst for atonement". The name Varbanets appeared in Gumilev and Akhmatova's correspondence earlier; Anna Andreyevna considered Natalia Vasilyevna an informer assigned to her. Although no archival evidence has been found for these suspicions, such prejudice greatly complicated relations.

In November 1954, Anna Andreyevna wrote to her son in the camp, asking him to "write a polite letter to Natalia Vasilyevna", claiming that "she has changed little, still the same "deva-roza"; later this naming became permanent. Akhmatova did not even try to hide her dislike. As a result, in 1955 Natalia Varbanets saw Anna Akhmatova extremely rarely, partly due to the poet's almost constant stay in Moscow; after improving her financial situation, she depended less on help from Natalia Vasilyevna. The diary noted growing alienation: "Anna Andreyevna extended her hand in greeting with a repelling gesture". Only three letters from Gumilev to N. Varbanets have been preserved. In one of them it was said:

A few more words about us. I don't know what it means "to love as one should", little deer. The statute of love is not written anywhere, everyone needs different things, and you yourself, for example, don't know exactly what you need, for all your Roman and non-Roman <several words crossed out> completely contradict your own character and taste. Therefore, I love you as one may love, especially since my job now is to entertain you with letters and clear your brains. <…> By the way, I can't understand <crossed out> what exactly constitutes uncertainty for you. <Crossed out> After all, no matter how much you or I promise each other in absentia, nothing will become more certain until we meet and are together. Well, I'll promise you your Roman rights, and you'll come, look at my gray head or lose yourself on the way to some sweet woman... <Crossed out> What, impossible? And something else is possible: <crossed out> I am an inconvenient woman, as I know how to love very well, but am completely incapable of adoration.

According to S. Belyakov, the epistolary romance of Gumilev and Varbanets in 1955–1956 ran into the complete opposition of their life attitudes: Lev Nikolayevich strove for traditional, even Domostroy-like relations; Natalia Vasilyevna, obviously, completely withdrew into her familiar cultural-intellectual environment and aspired to "calm solitude". In correspondence, she could allow herself known sharpness (for example, calling Lev an "ass") and put aesthetic principles first in their relations. In the last month of imprisonment, Lev Nikolayevich did not write to Natalia.

==== Break up ====
In the memoirs of A. B. Davidson, all responsibility for the break up between Lev Gumilev and Natalia Varbanets was placed on Anna Akhmatova. After release from the camp and return to Leningrad in 1956, L. Gumilev tried for another two months to communicate with N. Varbanets; details of their break were not recorded by anyone. In one private letter of 1957, Natalia Vasilyevna reported that "every day, rising from sleep, I humbly thank God that I do not have to deal with him".

Akhmatova and Varbanets last met in June 1957 at the Pushkin House; the previous communication session was by phone on the eve of Lev Gumilev's return from the camp more than a year earlier. They met on the landing (Varbanets was going to smoke); the diary noted that Anna Andreyevna extended her hand hesitantly and never dared to speak. Natalia Vasilyevna recorded that that day she wanted "...to say goodbye to her, telling her that I love her and somehow cleanse in her eyes the memory of myself from the rubbish with which, I am sure, both Lev and the servile ladies and her own self-loving hysteria buried me". A few years later, Varbanets learned that Akhmatova had publicly stated several times that Natalia Vasilyevna allegedly gave testimony against Lev Gumilev and slandered him, for which she was refused to stay. "Thus fell another greatness of soul". Maryana Kozyreva (whose husband brought the evil news) publicly slapped Lev Gumilev. Due to personal disappointment, N. Varbanets "lost trust in Anna Akhmatova's poetic word as well".

In N. Varbanets's diary on March 6, 1966, it is noted that Maryana Kozyreva reported Akhmatova's death the previous day, "as if I should grieve and be shocked"; she herself felt no grief and "no sense that the world had become lesser". On the day of the funeral, March 10, Natalia Vasilyevna's diary says that "everyone urged me to go, or wondered why I didn't"; "and everyone judges me in their own way... for non-participation in a great event". At the same time, by her own admission, she cried in the evening when alone in the "Faust Cabinet", because "who will dig through archives for me to prove that this never happened".

And I realized that there is for me neither a great era, nor Anna, nor exalted moments, only the devastation of the soul and the dirty slander left to me as inheritance by the greatest Anna.

The only meeting with Gumilev after that occurred by chance in a tram in 1969, when Lev Nikolayevich recited aloud to the whole car a fragment from Ruslan and Ludmila: "Ah, knight, that was Naina!", forcing Varbanets to get off at the next stop. Gumilev was proud of his "revenge" and told about it to V. Abrosov and G. Prokhorov.

== Legacy ==
With the publication of new biographies and documentary evidence about L. Gumilev after the 1990s, interest in the personality of N. Varbanets also revived. In 1994, M. Kozyreva's memoirs were published for the first time. In 2005, the Museum of Anna Akhmatova in the Fountain House published the correspondence between N. Varbanets and L. Gumilev, which had been transferred there by the Kozyrev family. Based on the body of correspondence, the theater of the Fountain House staged the performance Why Was There So Much Lying?: three actors read excerpts from authentic prose, diary, poetic, and epistolary texts by Akhmatova, Varbanets, and Gumilev. "The mosaic of texts recreates for us moments of the era that so tragically marked the fates of living and loving people". As part of the inter-museum project "Gumilev Days in Norilsk", on October 29, 2017, the performance was brought and shown at the Norilsk Museum.

== Bibliography ==
Primary sources

- В память ушедших и во славу живущих: Письма читателей с фронта. Дневники и воспоминания сотрудников Публичной библиотеки, 1941—1945 (600 copies ed.). St. Petersburg: Издательство Российской национальной библиотеки. 1995. p. 274.
- Davidson, A. B. (2008). "Переплетение судеб". Мир Николая Гумилева, поэта, путешественника, воина (1000 copies ed.). Moscow: Русское слово (Russian Word). p. 316. ISBN 978-5-94853-979-9.
- Gumilev, L. N. (2005). «И зачем нужно было столько лгать?»: Письма Льва Гумилёва к Наталье Варбанец из лагеря: 1950—1956. Deus conservat omnia. St. Petersburg: Музей Анны Ахматовой в Фонтанном доме (Museum of Anna Akhmatova in the Fountain House). p. 160. ISBN 5-91044-003-9.
- Kozyreva, M. L. (2006). "Лев и Птица". «Живя в чужих словах…»: воспоминания о Л. Н. Гумилёве. St. Petersburg: Росток (Rostok). pp. 144–153. ISBN 5-94668-037-4.
- Lyublinskaya, A. D. (2006). "Письма военных лет". История библиотек. Исследования, материалы, документы. Issue 6 / compiled by Matveeva I., Volodin B. F.; scientific editor Matveev M. (400 copies ed.). St. Petersburg: Изд-во Рос. нац. б-ки (Publishing House of the Russian National Library). pp. 307–417.
- Yudina, M. V. (2009). В искусстве радостно быть вместе. Переписка, 1959—1961 гг. Moscow: РОССПЭН (ROSSPEN). p. 814. ISBN 978-5-8243-1224-9.
- Yudina, M. V. (2010). Нереальность зла : переписка 1964—1966 гг. Moscow: РОССПЭН (ROSSPEN). p. 675. ISBN 978-5-8243-1507-3.

Encyclopedic publications

- Vakhtina, P. L. "Варбанец Наталия Васильевна". Сотрудники РНБ — деятели науки и культуры. Биографический словарь. Российская национальная библиотека (Russian National Library).
- Nemirovsky, E. L. (1998). Книга : Энциклопедия (5000 copies ed.). Moscow: Большая российская энциклопедия (Great Russian Encyclopedia). p. 127. ISBN 5-85270-312-5.
- Путеводитель по фондам отдела редких книг Российской национальной библиотеки (1000 copies ed.). St. Petersburg: Российская нац. б-ка : КМБХ (Russian National Library : KMBKh). 2015. ISBN 978-5-8192-0483-2.

Monographs, articles

- Belyakov, S. S. (2013). Гумилёв сын Гумилёва: [биография Льва Гумилёва] (additional 3000 copies ed.). Moscow: АСТ (AST). p. 797. ISBN 978-5-17-077567-5.
- Gorfunkele, A. Kh. (1997). "Оксфордская биобиблиография русских книговедов («Памятки» Дж. С. Г. Симмонса)". Историко-библиографические Исследования (Historical and Bibliographical Research). Collection of Scientific Works. 7 (600 copies ed.). St. Petersburg: Издательство РНБ (Publishing House of the Russian National Library): 120–127.
- Erykalova, I. (2019). "Венера и Талия в эпоху Ежова и Берии. Лагерная переписка Льва Гумилёва". Библиотечное Дело (Library Affairs) (5): 26–31.
- Zvereva, I. S.; Nikolaev, N. V. (2007). "Рукописи не горят: история выхода в свет первого фундаментального каталога инкунабулов Российской национальной библиотеки". Университетская Книга (University Book). 6 (127): 76–80. ISSN 1726-6726.
- Zvereva, I. S. (2015). "Наследие Вольтера в Российской национальной библиотеке" (PDF). Вольтеровские Чтения (Voltaire Readings). 3: 13–51.
- Karp, S. Ya. (1998). Французские просветители и Россия : Исследования по истории русско-французских культурных связей второй половины XVIII века : диссертация … доктора исторических наук : 07.00.03 (Thesis). Moscow: Коллекции ЭК РГБ. p. 542.
- Kupriyanova, T. G. (2015). "Деятельность первопечатников в историографической оценке: к 450-летию «Апостола» Ивана Федорова". Научный Опыт И Знания: Историческое Прошлое, Настоящее И Перспективы Будущего. Сборник Трудов Всероссийской Научно-практической Конференции (Scientific Experience and Knowledge: Historical Past, Present and Future Prospects. Collection of Proceedings of the All-Russian Scientific and Practical Conference). Moscow: Федеральное государственное бюджетное образовательное учреждение инклюзивного высшего образования «Московский государственный гуманитарно-экономический институт» (Moscow State Humanitarian and Economic Institute): 11–15.
- Levina, S. S.; Petrova, L. N. (1976). Книговедческое изучение русской революционной нелегальной печати XIX в. [Bibliographic study of Russian revolutionary underground publications of the 19th century] (Collection of Articles). Moscow: Наука. pp. 260–269.
- Nemirovsky, E. L. (1989). Иоганн Гутенберг, около 1399—1468. Научно-биографическая литература (Scientific and Biographical Literature) (5200 copies ed.). Moscow: Наука (Nauka). p. 320. ISBN 5-02-012646-2.
- Rubinchik, O. (2004). "Das Ewig-Weibliche в советском аду". Наше Наследие (Our Heritage) (71): 107–129.
- Smusina, M. (1975). "Кабинет Фауста". Ленинградский Рабочий (Leningrad Worker).
- Somov, V. A. (2020). "Владимир Сергеевич Люблинский и его курс «Всеобщая история» в Ленинградской государственной консерватории (1936—1939 гг.)" (PDF). Musicus: Bulletin of the St. Petersburg State Conservatory Named After N. A. Rimsky-Korsakov (2): 13–22.
- Simmons, John Gabriel Simon (1987). A Russian incunabulist : Natal'ya Vasil'evna Varbanets : a bibliography with a portrait. Russia/USSR 032. Oxford: All Souls College. pp. 5 unnumbered. ISBN 095121571X.

Publications

- "Return of Evacuated Rare Books to the SPL" [Vozvrashcheniye evakuirovannykh redkikh knig v GPB] (PDF). Smena (in Russian). 1945-10-07.
- Varbanets, N. V. (1955). "Incunabula in the Saltykov-Schedrin library, Leningrad". The Book Collector. 4 (4): 273–278.
- Varbanets, N. V. (1956). "Rare Incunabula" [Redkiye inkunabuly]. IB GPB (in Russian) (9/10 (16/17)): 34–35.
- Varbanets, N. V. (1957). "Two Unknown French Editions of the 15th Century" [Dva neizvestnykh frantsuzskikh izdaniya XV v.]. Proceedings of the Saltykov-Shchedrin State Public Library (in Russian). 1 (4): 175–180.
- Berkov, P. V.; Varbanets, N. V. (1958). "Current State of the Gutenberg Question" [Sovremennoye sostoyaniye gutenbergovskogo voprosa]. Proceedings of the Krupskaya Leningrad State Library Institute (in Russian) (IV): 219–228.
- Varbanets, N. V.; Lukjanenko, V. I. (1960). Book. Researches and materials [Kniga. Issledovaniya i materialy]. Moscow: All-Union Book Chamber Publishing House. pp. 187–208.
- Varbanets, N. V.; Kopreeva, T. N. (1960). "Voltaire's Library in Leningrad" [Biblioteka Vol'tera v Leningrade]. In Defense of Peace (in Russian) (4): 54–60.
- Varbanets, N. V.; Kopreeva, T. N. (1960-04-10). "Voltaire's Library" [Biblioteka Vol'tera]. Literature and Life (in Russian): 4.
- Voltaire's Library: Book Catalog [Biblioteka Vol'tera: Katalog knig]. Moscow–Leningrad: USSR Academy of Sciences Publishing House [Leningrad Branch]. 1961. p. 1171.
- Sigal, N. (1962). "Voltaire's Library" [Biblioteka Vol'tera]. Questions of Literature (in Russian) (4): 331–333.
- Varbanets, N. V. (1962a). "Voltaire's Library" [Biblioteka Vol'tera]. In the World of Books (in Russian) (2): 45.
- Varbanets, N. V. (1962b). IV International Congress of Slavists: Discussion Materials [IV Mezhdunar. s'yezd slavistov: Materialy diskussii]. Vol. 1: Problems of Slavic Literary Studies, Folklore and Stylistics. Moscow: USSR Academy of Sciences Publishing House. pp. 162–163.
- Varbanets, N. V. (1964). The Tale of Dracula [Povest' o Drakule]. Leningrad: Nauka. pp. 185–193.
- Varbanets, N. V. (1965). "In Search of Diderot's Library". In the World of Books (in Russian) (12): 38–39.
- Varbanets, N. V. (1968a). ""Faust's Study" in Leningrad" [«Kabinet Fausta» v Leningrade]. In the World of Books (in Russian) (9): 44–46.
- Varbanets, N. V. (1968b). Five Hundred Years After Gutenberg. 1468–1968: Articles, Studies, Materials [Pyat'sot let posle Gutenberga. 1468–1968: Stat'i, issledovaniya, materialy]. Moscow: Nauka. pp. 67–143.
- Barenbaum, I. E. (1971). "Review: 500 Years After Gutenberg" [Retsenziya: 500 let posle Gutenberga]. Book. Researches and Materials (in Russian) (22). Moscow: Kniga: 244–248.
- Varbanets, N. V. (1968c). "Rules for Describing Incunabula". Collection of Methodological Materials. Work Experience [Sbornik metodicheskikh materialov. Opyt raboty]. Leningrad: Saltykov-Shchedrin State Public Library. Rare Books Department. pp. 138–187.
- Varbanets, N. V. (1968d). "Introduction to Working with Incunabula". Collection of Methodological Materials. Work Experience [Sbornik metodicheskikh materialov. Opyt raboty]. Leningrad: Saltykov-Shchedrin State Public Library. Rare Books Department. pp. 189–240.
- Varbanets, N. V.; Kopreeva, T. N. (1969). "In Memory of Vladimir Sergeevich Lyublinsky". Book: Studies and Materials [Kniga: Issledovaniya i materialy]. Moscow: Kniga. pp. 246–250.
- Lyublinsky V. S. (1972). The Book in the History of Human Society: Collection of Selected Book Studies Works [Kniga v istorii chelovecheskogo obshchestva: Sbornik izbr. knigovedch. rabot]. Moscow: Kniga. p. 327.
- Varbanets N. V. (1972a). "On the Study of Rare Editions of the Founders of Marxism-Leninism". Book. Researches and materials [Kniga. Issledovaniya i materialy]. Moscow: Kniga. pp. 203–210.
- Varbanets, N. V. (1972b). Johann Gutenberg and the Beginning of Printing in Europe: Abstract of Candidate's Dissertation in Philological Sciences, Specialty No. 052504 "Book Studies" [Iogann Gutenberg i nachalo knigopechataniya v Evrope: avtoref. dis. kand. filol. nauk po spetsial'nosti № 052504 «Knigovedeniye»] (Thesis). Leningrad. p. 27.
- Varbanets, N. V. (1972c). "Editions of Ancient Authors in the 15th Century" [Izdaniya antichnykh avtorov v XV v.]. Book and Graphics (in Russian): 68–77.
- Varbanets, N. V.; Lukjanenko, V. I. (1979). "Cyrillic Editions in Cetinje (1493–1496)". Južnoslovenski filolog (in Serbian). VIII (1): 5–10.
- Varbanets, N. V. (1979). Problems of Source Study of Manuscript and Early Printed Collections [Problemy istochnikovedcheskogo izucheniya rukopisnykh i staropechatnykh fondov]. Vol. 1. Leningrad: SPL. pp. 173–182.
- Varbanets, N. V. (1980a). "On the Sources and Significance of B. von Breydenbach's "Pilgrimage to the Holy Land" (Based on Editions of 1486–88)" [Ob istochnikakh i znachenii «Palomnichestva v svyatuyu zemlyu» B. fon Breydenbakha (po izdaniyam 1486–88 gg.)]. Problems of Source Study of Manuscript and Early Printed Collections (in Russian) (2): 171–193.
- Varbanets, N. V. (1980b). Johann Gutenberg and the Beginning of Printing in Europe: An Attempt at a New Reading of the Material [Iogann Gutenberg i nachalo knigopechataniya v Evrope: Opyt novogo prochteniya materiala]. Moscow: Kniga. p. 303.
- Medvedev, Yu. (1982). "The "Case" of Johann Gutenberg: Review of the Book by N. V. Varbanets "Johann Gutenberg..."" [«Delo» Ioganna Gutenberga: Rets. na kn.: Varbanets N. V. Iogann Gutenberg...]. Librarian (in Russian) (2): 52–54.
- Lyublinsky, S. B. (1982a). "Monograph on Gutenberg: Review of the Book by N. V. Varbanets "Johann Gutenberg..."". Book. Studies and Materials [Kniga. Issledovaniya i materialy]. Moscow: Kniga. pp. 208–213.
- Lyublinsky, V. S. (1982b). "Leningrad Notes". In Published by N. V. Varbanets (ed.). Book. Researches and materials [Kniga. Issledovaniya i materialy]. Moscow: Kniga. pp. 130–137.
- Varbanets, N. V. (1982). "Printers — Enlighteners in the 15th Century". In Nemirovsky, Ye. L. (ed.). Fedorov Readings 1979 [Fyodorovskiye chteniya 1979]. Moscow: Nauka. pp. 35–56.
- Varbanets, N. V. (1983). "Incunabula Studies Publications of the V. I. Lenin State Library of the USSR" [Inkunabulovedcheskiye izdaniya Gosudarstvennoy biblioteki SSSR im. V. I. Lenina]. Book. Researches and Materials (in Russian) (46). Moscow: Kniga: 181–188.
- Varbanets, N. V. (1984). "Editions in Vernacular Languages in the 15th Century" [Izdaniya na narodnykh yazykakh v XV veke]. Book and Social Progress: Fifth All-Union Scientific Conference on Book Studies (April 10–12, 1984): Abstracts. Part 6: History of the Book Section (in Russian). Moscow: 25–27.
- Varbanets, N. V.; Lyublinsky, V. S. (2007). Borovsky, Ya. M. (ed.). Ancient Authors in 15th-Century Editions: Catalog [Antichnyye avtory v izdaniyakh XV veka: katalog]. St. Petersburg: Dmitry Bulanin. p. 557. ISBN 978-5-86007-528-3.
- Varbanets, N. V. (2008). "Opus 111". Nevel Collection (13). St. Petersburg: Akropol: 22–38. ISBN 978-5-86585-063-2.
