= Rachel Kogan =

Ukrainian-Jewish painter (1912–1998)

Rachel Kogan (1912–1998) was a Ukrainian-Jewish painter and educator known for her artwork in the field of realism.

== Biography ==
Kogan spent her childhood in Odessa and studied at the Trade-Union Art School. Following, she attended Odessa Art Institute. In 1931 the Kogan family moved to Leningrad and Kogan was transferred to the All–Russian Academy of Arts (the former St. Petersburg Imperial Arts Academy) to study painting.

Two of Kogan's professors were Shuchaev and Radlov. She received professional advice and support from Petrov-Vodkin.

In 1938, she was accepted to the Leningrad Department of the Artist's Union of the USSR and took part in local and national exhibitions.

During World War 2 and the siege on Leningrad, Kogan was evacuated with her children to Siberia. Her paintings were saved in the basements of the academy until the war had ended.

After World War 2, Kogan started teaching painting and became a professor of drawing at the Saint Petersburg Art and Industry Academy. Her work was exhibited in many USSR company collections throughout the Soviet Union.

Kogan then emigrated to Israel in 1973 and became a known artist and educator in the country. Her art-work is still presented in the Tel Aviv Museum of Art and in the Israel Museum in Jerusalem.

Rachel Kogan died at the age of 86.
