= Gumilev =

Gumilev or Gumilyov is a surname. Notable people with the name include:

- Nikolai Gumilev (1886–1921), Russian poet of the Silver Age
- Lev Gumilev (1912–1992), Soviet/Russian historian, son of Nikolai Gumilev and Anna Akhmatova
