= Kuzma Petrov-Vodkin =

Russian painter (1878–1939)

- Кузьма Петров-Водкин
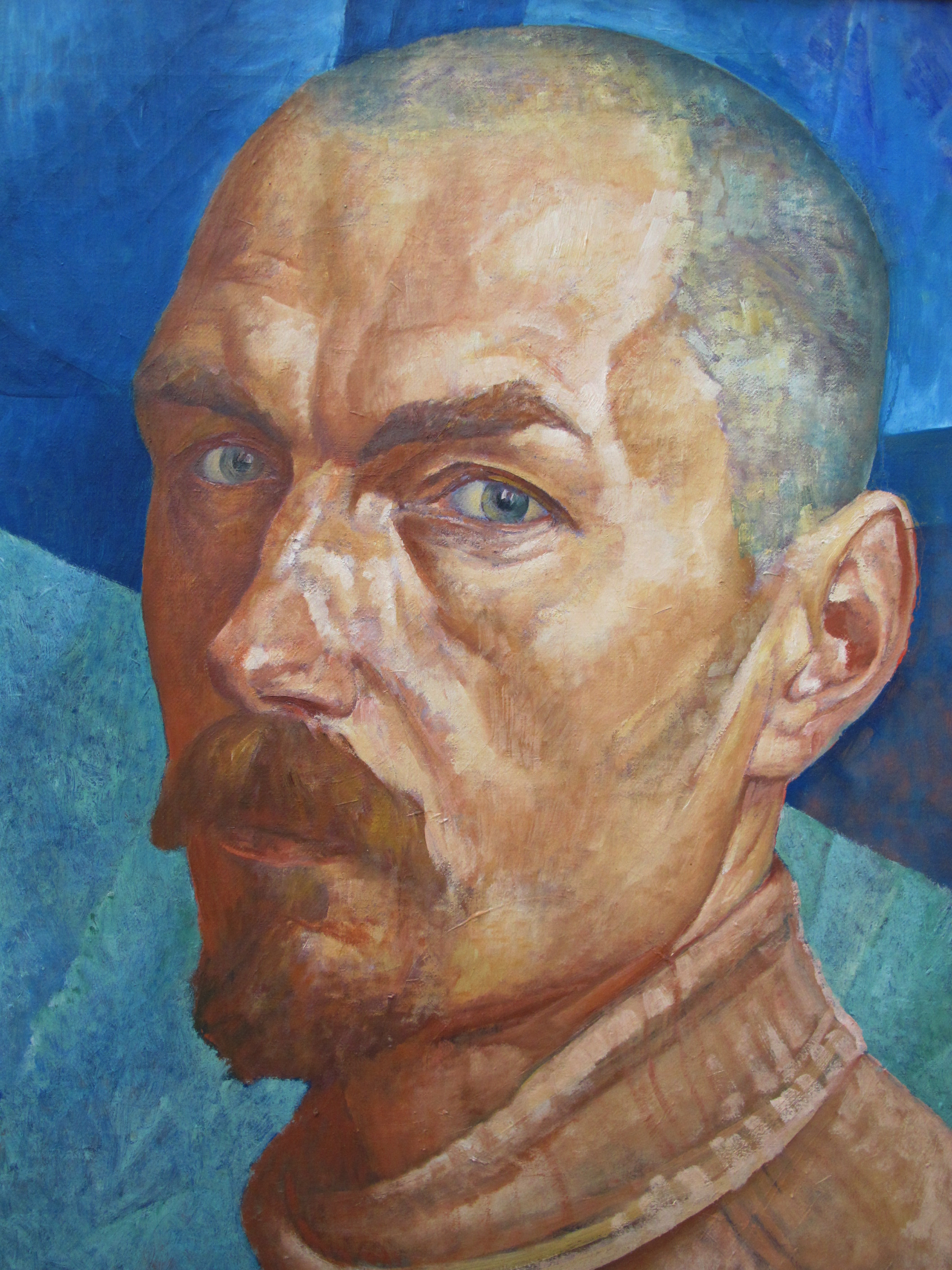
- Self-Portrait, 1918
- Born: November 5, 1878; Khvalynsk, Saratov Governorate, Russian Empire
- Died: February 15, 1939 (aged 60); Leningrad, Russian SFSR, Soviet Union
- Resting place: Literatorskiye Mostki, Saint Petersburg
- Style: Avant-garde

Kuzma Sergeyevich Petrov-Vodkin (Russian: Кузьма́ Серге́евич Петро́в-Во́дкин; November 5, [O. S. 24 October] 1878 – February 15, 1939) was a Russian and Soviet painter. His early iconographic work used special creative effects based on the curve of the globe, but its images were considered blasphemous by the Russian Orthodox Church. However he went on to become the first president of the Leningrad Union of Soviet Artists. His autobiographical writings attracted much praise, and have enjoyed a later revival. He was one of the members of the art association ‘The Four Arts’, which existed in Moscow and Leningrad in 1924-1931.

== Biography ==
=== Early years ===
Kuzma Petrov-Vodkin was born in Khvalynsk (Saratov Oblast) into the family of a local shoemaker. His first exposure to art was in his early childhood, when he took some lessons from a couple of icon painters and a signmaker. Still, Petrov-Vodkin didn't quite see himself in art at that time; after graduating from middle school, he took a summer job at a small shipyard with plans to get into railroad college in Samara. After failing his exam, he turned to "Art Classes of Fedor Burov" in 1896

In April 1895, Burov died and for some time Petrov-Vodkin took different painting jobs in the vicinity of Saratov. By chance, his mother's employer invited a well-known architect, Robert Meltzer (ru). Petrov-Vodkin was introduced to the guest and impressed him enough to get an invitation to study art at Saint Petersburg. The education was financed by a charitable subscription among local merchants. He also met at this time Victor Borisov-Musatov, an important painter resident in Saratov, who encouraged Petrov-Vodkin to continue his studies.

Petrov-Vodkin stayed in Saint Petersburg from 1895 to 1897 studying at the Stieglitz Academy, before moving to the Moscow School of Painting, Sculpture and Architecture. There Petrov-Vodkin was a student of Valentin Serov, Isaak Levitan, and especially Konstantin Korovin. In 1901 he travelled to Munich to take classes with Anton Ažbe.

He graduated in 1904.

=== Beginning of independent work (1899-1912) ===
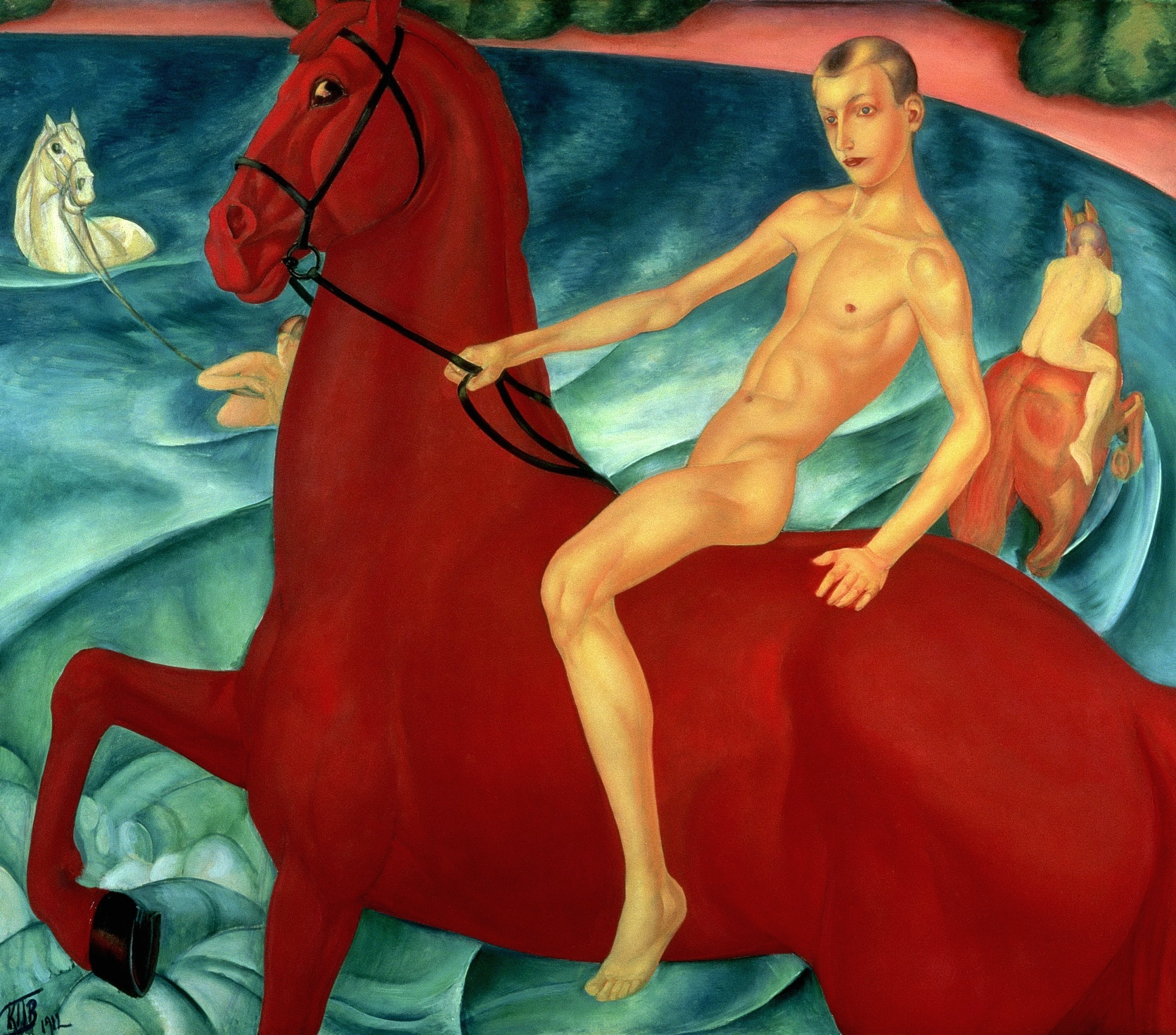
Bathing of a Red Horse, 1912

While in Paris in 1906 he met and married Maria Jovanovic (1885–1960), a daughter of Serbian immigrant hotel-keepers. She remained his lifelong companion. They had two daughters, one of whom died [unverified] in childhood.

Even during his college years, Petrov-Vodkin managed to enter into conflict with the Russian Orthodox Church, which discarded his work on a chapel in Samara and ultimately destroyed it as unacceptable. A number of his early works were deemed too erotic. His first well-known work was The Dream (1910), which sparked a discussion among contemporary Russian artists. The main defender of the painting was Alexandre Benois; his main detractor was Ilya Repin (hence, Petrov-Vodkin was discussed by two of the major Russian painters of the time). Other major works of that time include Boys at play, and, notably, Bathing of a Red Horse, (1912) his most iconic work - a symbol of the coming social changes. The latter became an instant classic, and, in a sense, trademark for the artist.

During this stage in his artistic development, Petrov-Vodkin extensively used an aesthetic of Orthodox icon together with brighter colours and unusual compositions. His works were often deemed blasphemous and erotic.

=== Maturity (1912-1928) ===
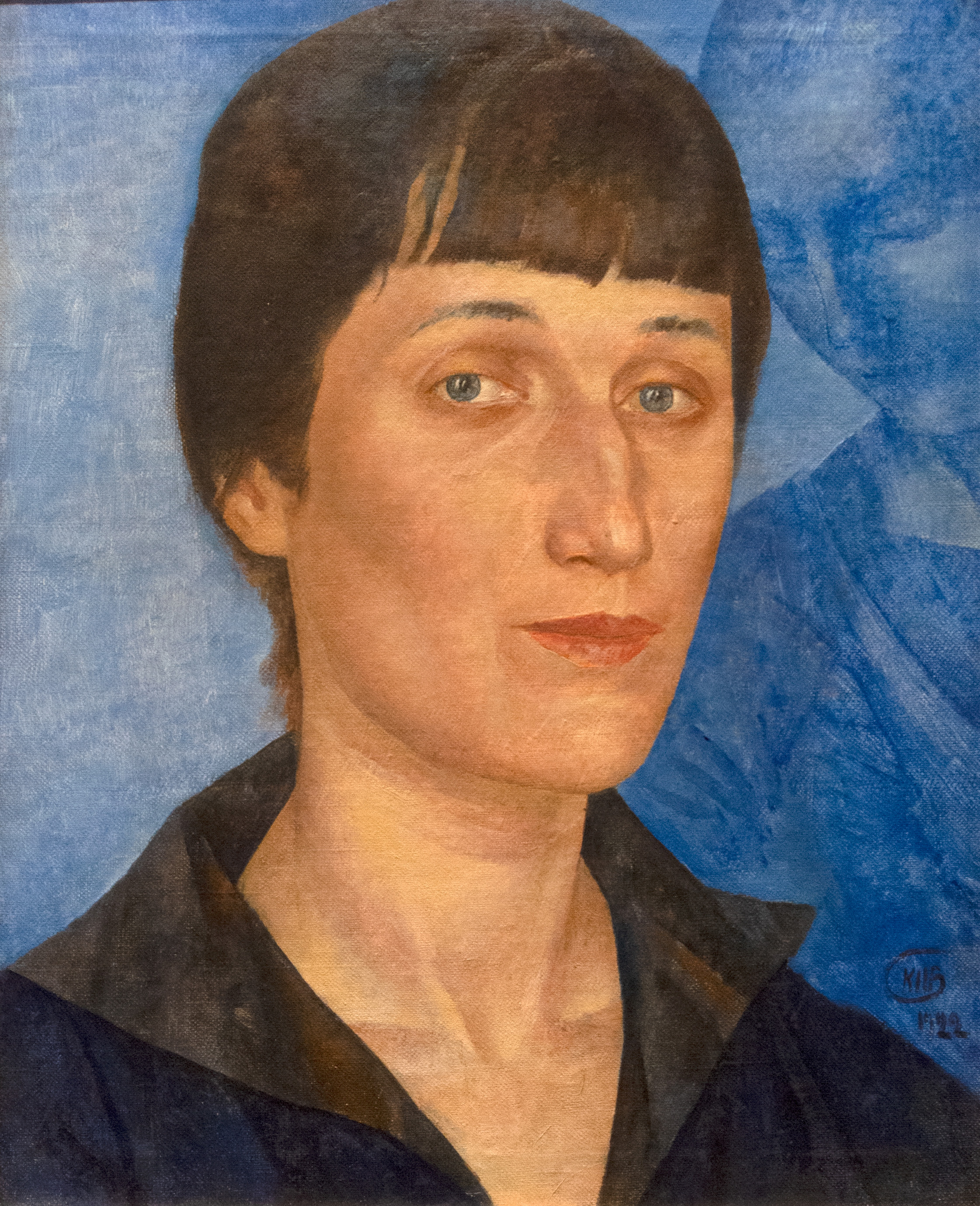
Anna Akhmatova, 1922

From 1924 to 1926 Petrov-Vodkin lived in France with his family. In 1922 he painted a portrait of the Russian poet Anna Akhmatova.

During his earlier years, Petrov-Vodkin developed his "spherical perspective": a unique twist that distorted the drawing as to represent the viewer high enough to actually notice the spherical curve of the globe.

He used it extensively through his works like Death of a Commissar and In the Line of Fire, which make the observer seem more distant, but actually close. It is argued that this twist has been built upon Byzantine perspective - an inverted perspective used in iconography.

Petrov-Vodkin used darker tones with time, but his paintings became more detailed. He started painting still life and portraits, stepping further away from his previous themes.

With help from the Soviet government, he made several trips across the Soviet Union, producing many works with didactic purposes.

=== Later years (1928-1937) ===
In 1927, Petrov-Vodkin contracted pulmonary tuberculosis and had to curtail painting for several years. He turned to literature and wrote three major semi-autobiographical volumes, Khlynovsk, Euclid's Space and Samarkandia. The first two of these are considered on a par with the finest Russian literature of the time.

In the spring of 1932 the Central Committee of the Communist Party decreed that all existing literary and artistic groups and organizations should be disbanded and replaced with unified associations of creative professions. Accordingly, the Leningrad Union of Artists was established on 2 August 1932, which brought the history of post-revolutionary art to a close. The epoch of Soviet art began. Petrov-Vodkin was elected the first president of the Leningrad Union of Artists in 1932.

Petrov-Vodkin's other important pieces during this period include 1919. Alarm. (1934).

In February 1939, Petrov-Vodkin died of tuberculosis in Leningrad.

== Legacy ==
Until the mid-1960s, Petrov-Vodkin was nearly forgotten in the Soviet Union after his curtailment of painting and turn towards writing.

Petrov-Vodkin writings were republished in the 1970s to a great acclaim, after a long period of neglect. His most famous literary works are the 3 self-illustrated autobiographical novellas: "Khlynovsk", "Euclidean Space" and "Samarkandia". The second of these is of particular importance, as it transmits Petrov-Vodkin worldview as an artist in great detail. Petrov-Vodkin also gave professional support to Rachel Kogan, who was his protégé and friend.

The largest collection of Petrov-Vodkin's works is in the Russian Museum in St Petersburg, where, as of 2012, a whole room in the permanent exhibition is devoted to the painter. A memorial museum was also set up to Petrov-Vodkin in the house he built for his parents in his home town of Khvalynsk. It displays a selection of his works, as well as works by other Khvalynsk painters.

== Works ==
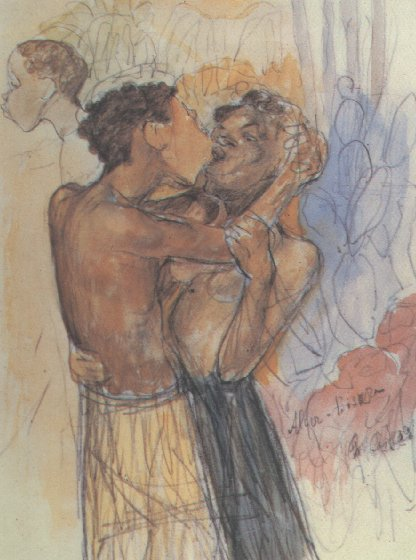
Kiss

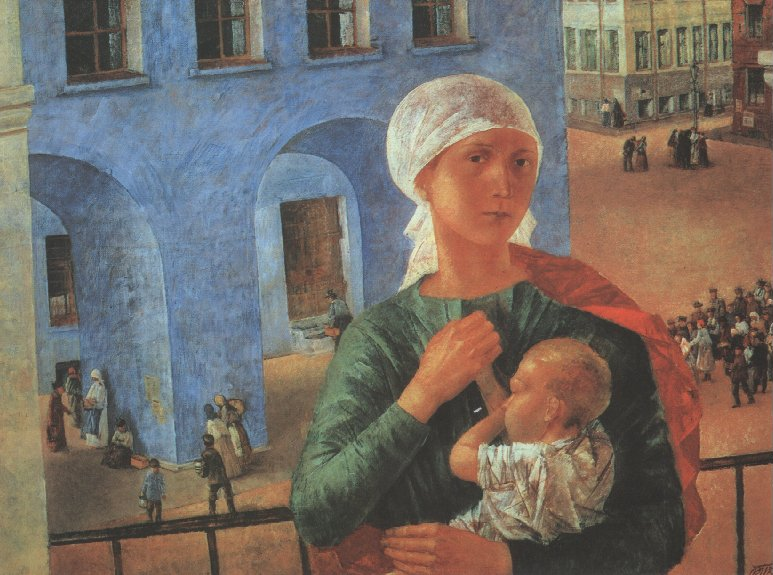
Petrograd Madonna

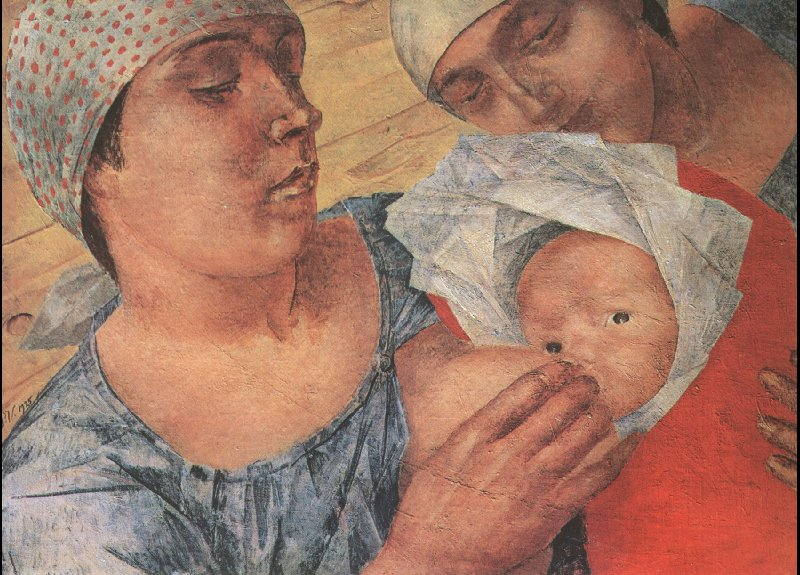
Motherhood

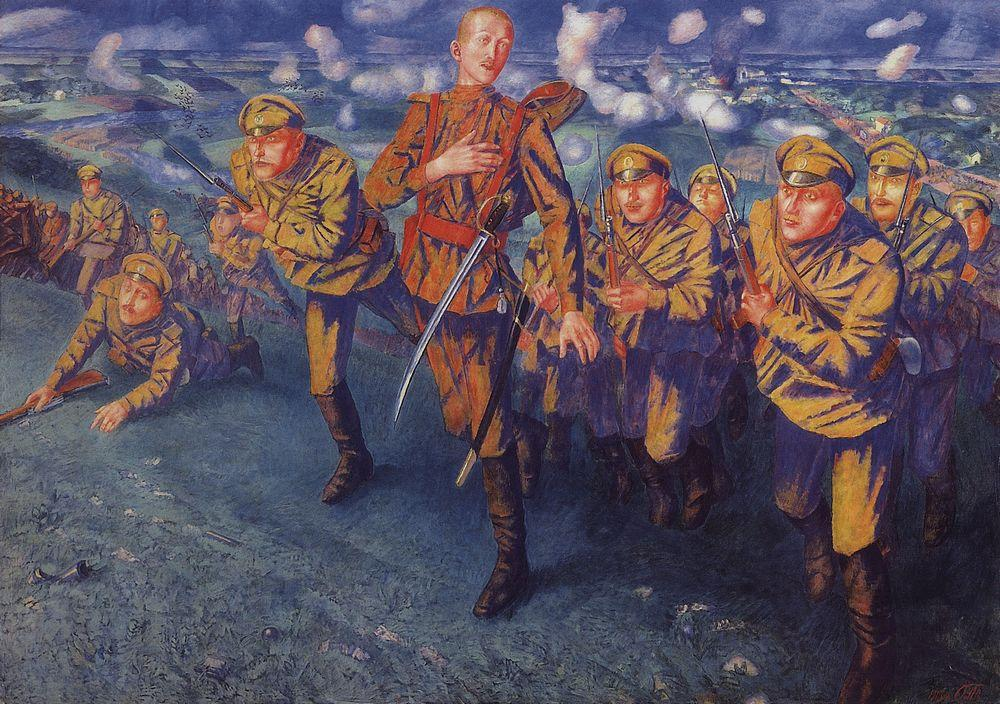
On the Line of Fire

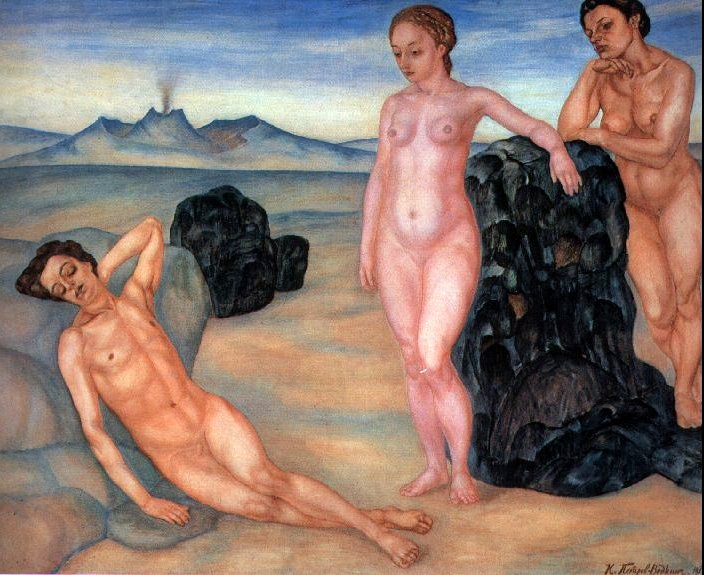
Dream

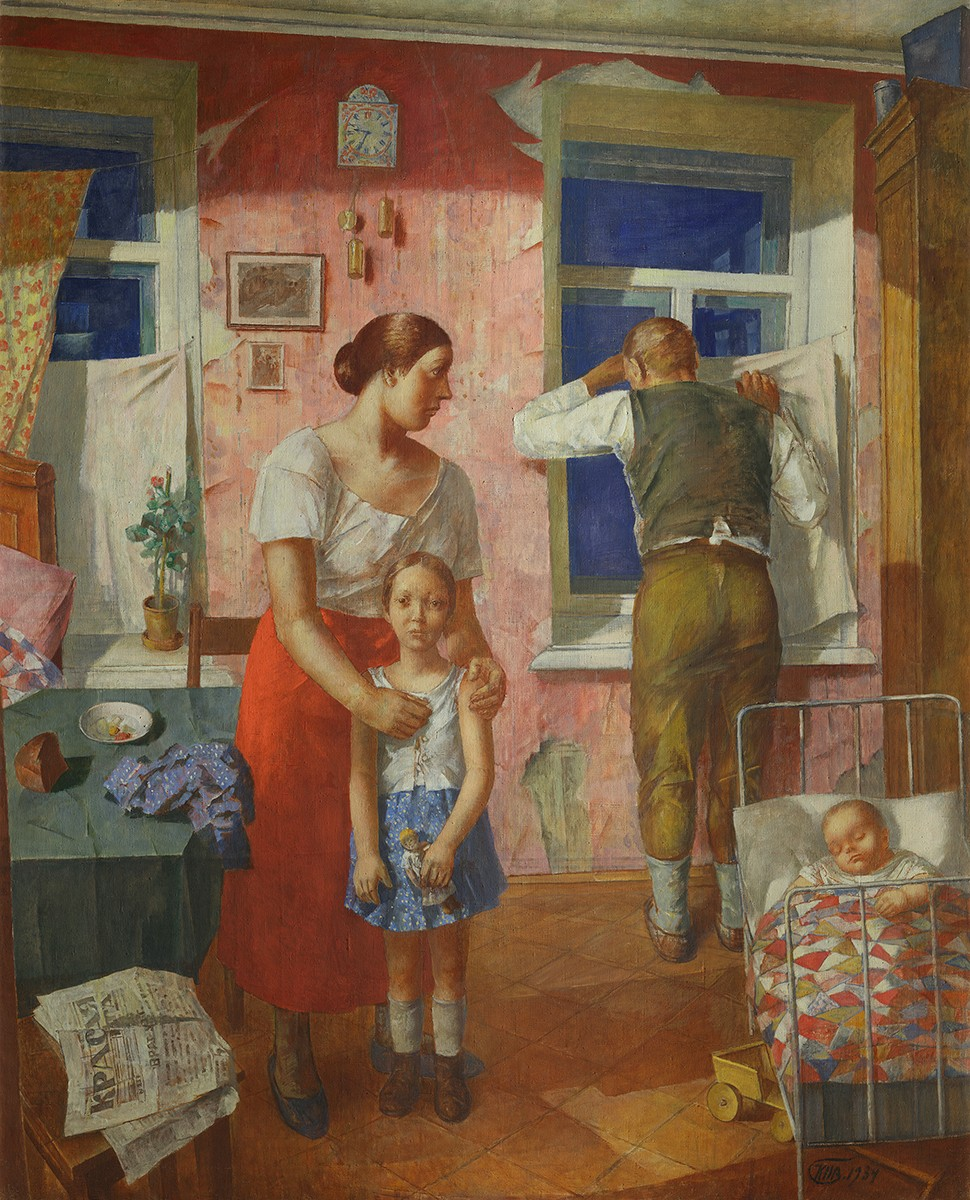
1919. Alarm.

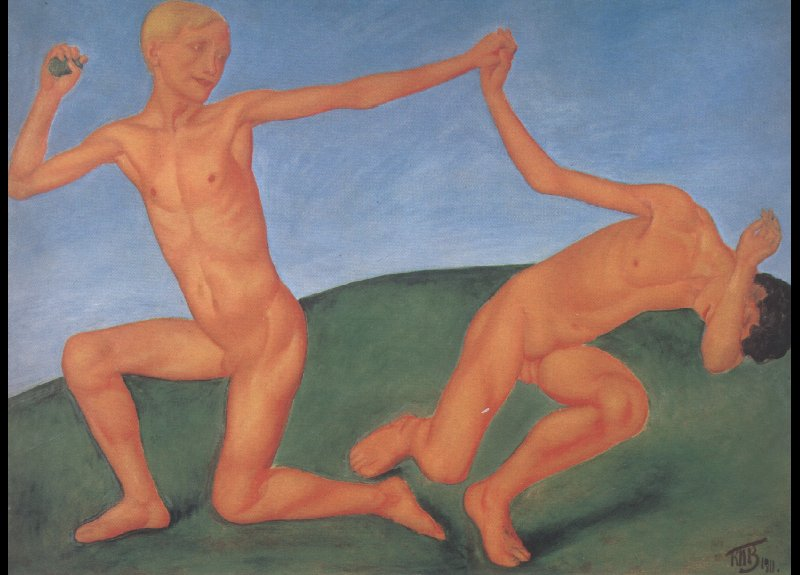
Boys at play

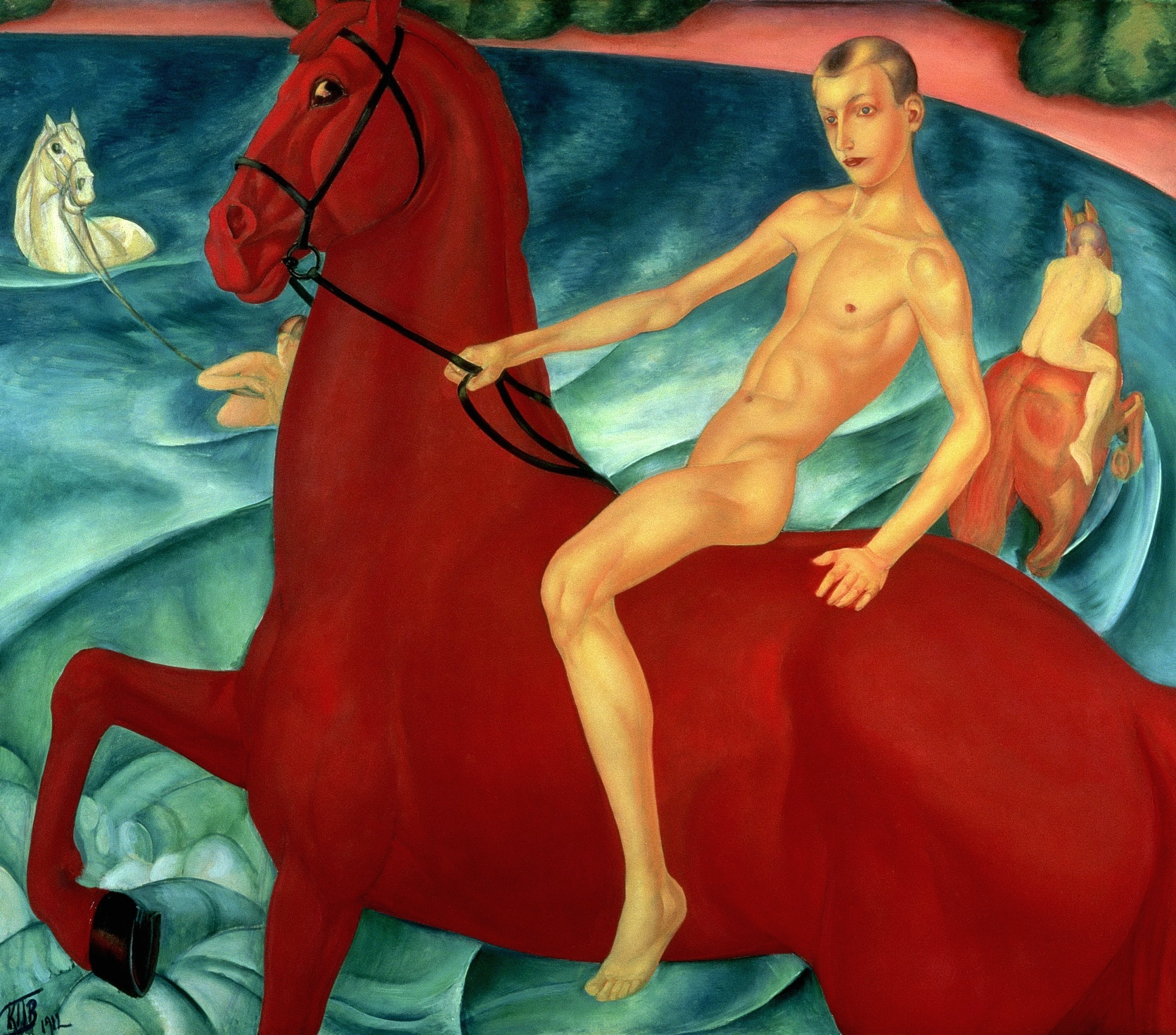
Bathing of a Red Horse

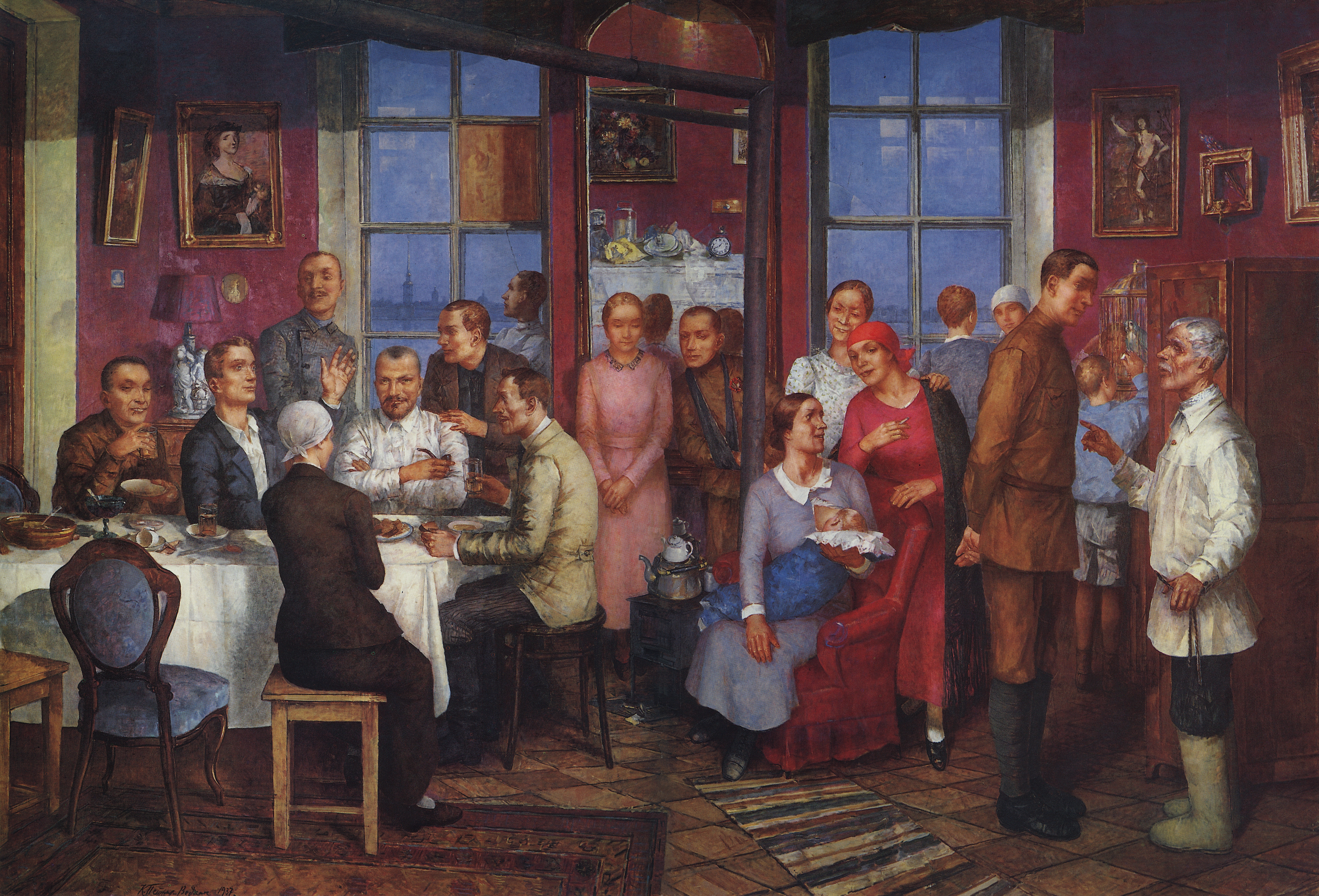
House-warming party

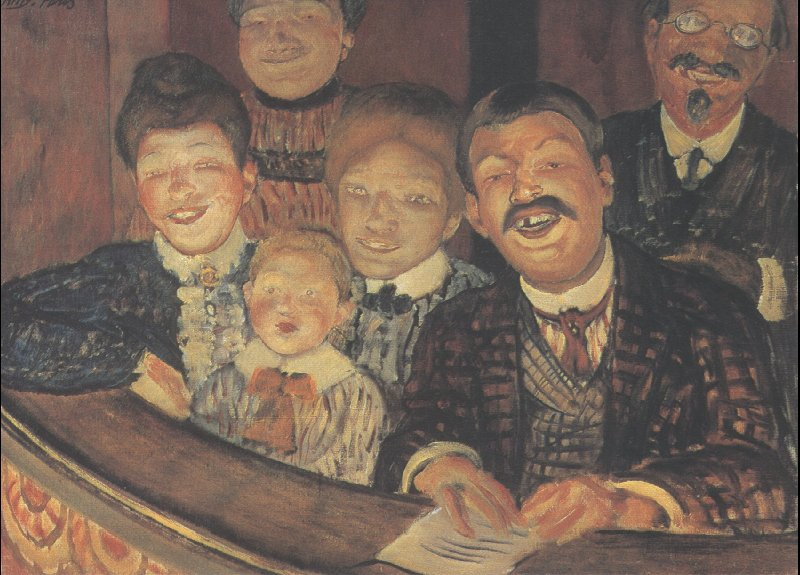
Theatre. Farce.

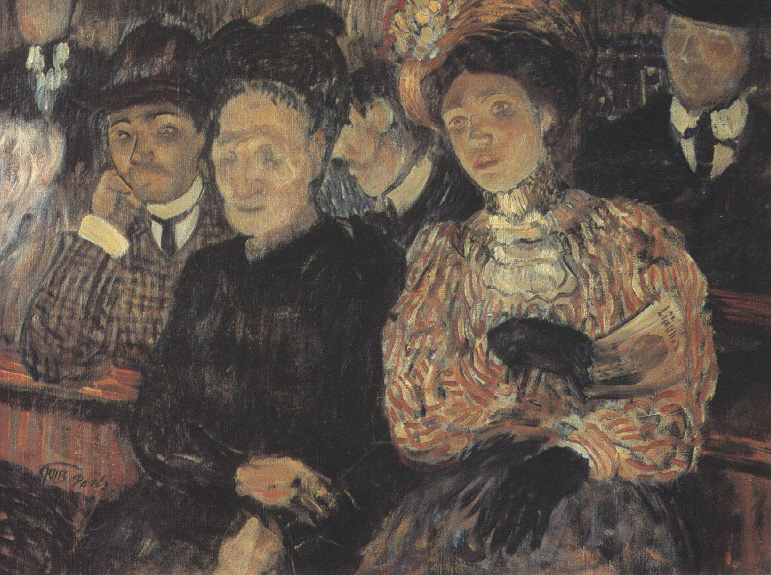
Theatre. Tragedy.

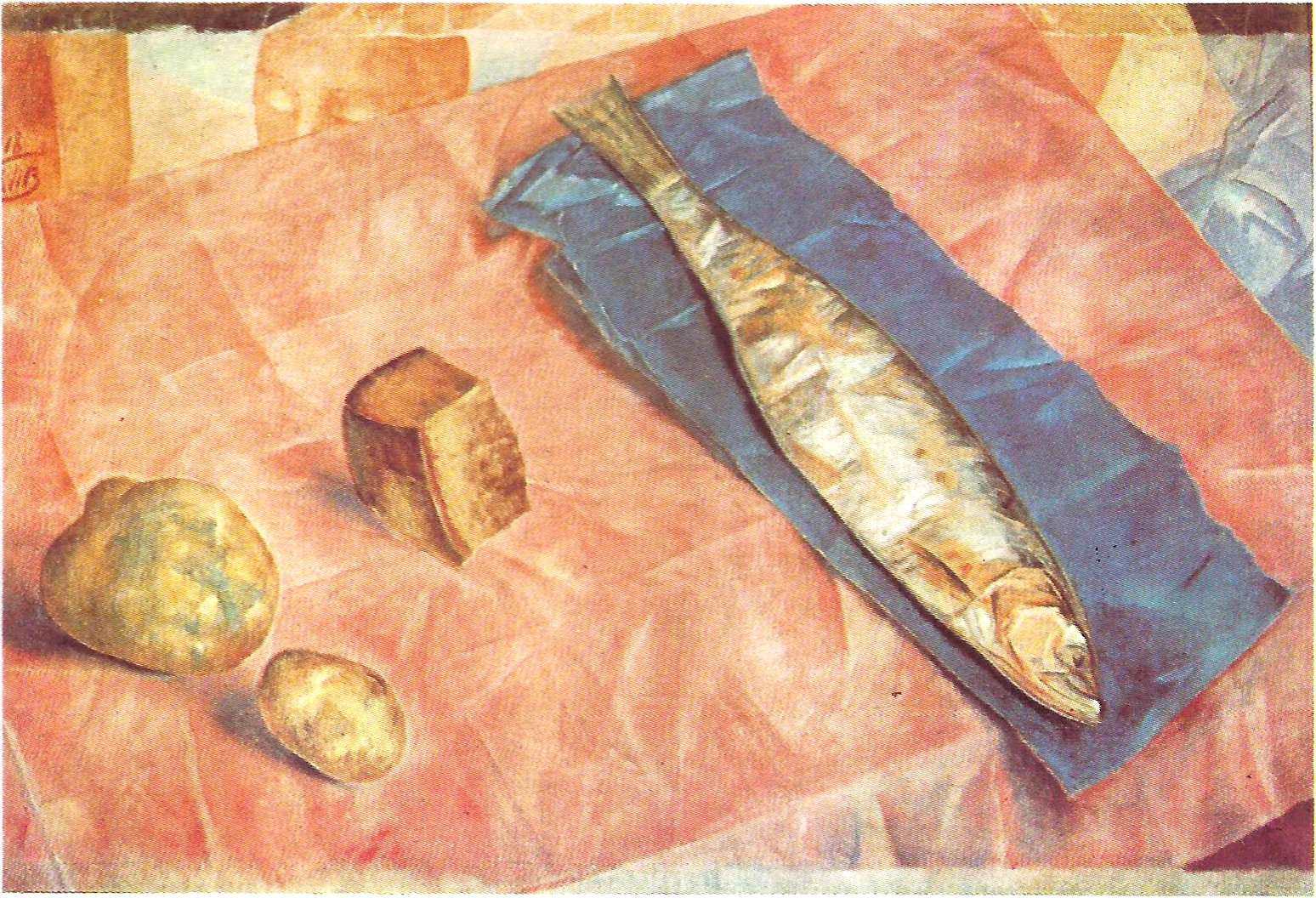
Still-life with a Herring

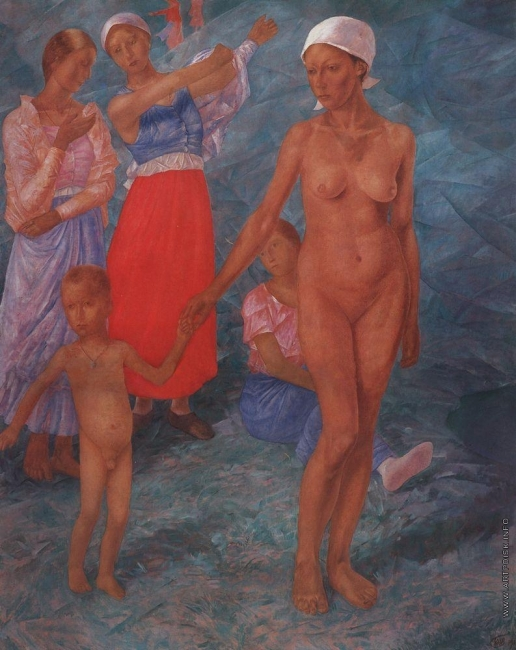
Bather's morning

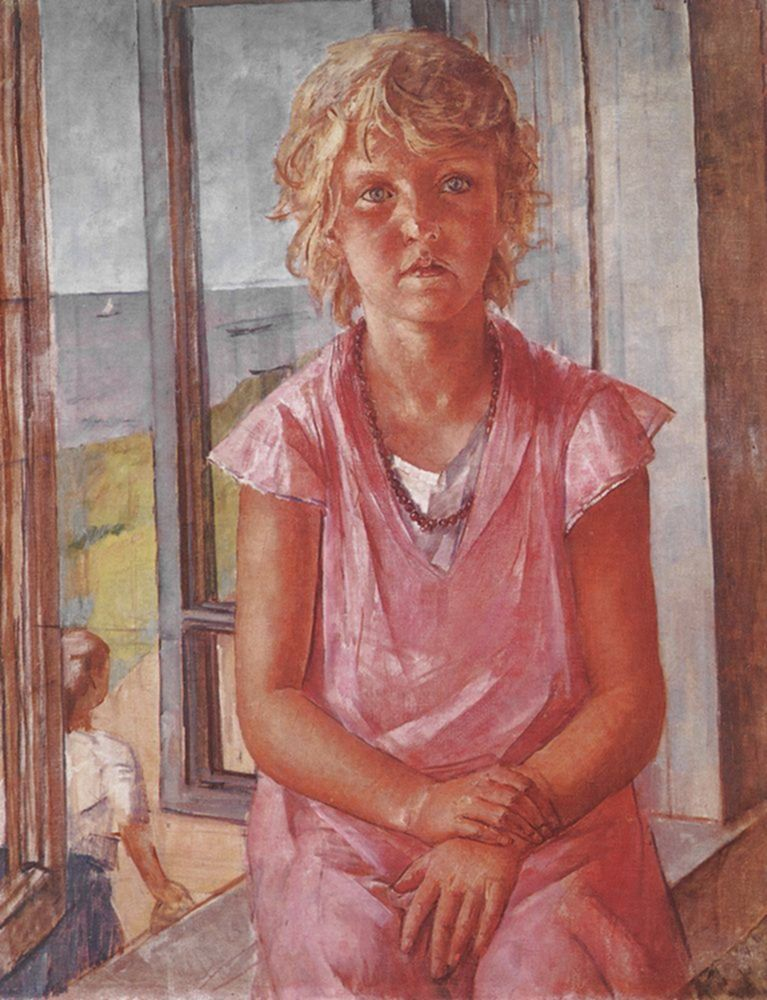
Fisherman's Daughter

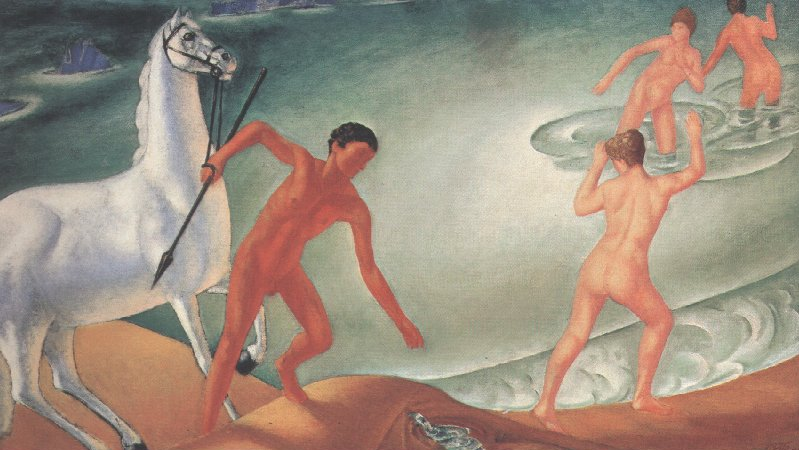
Thirsty Warrior

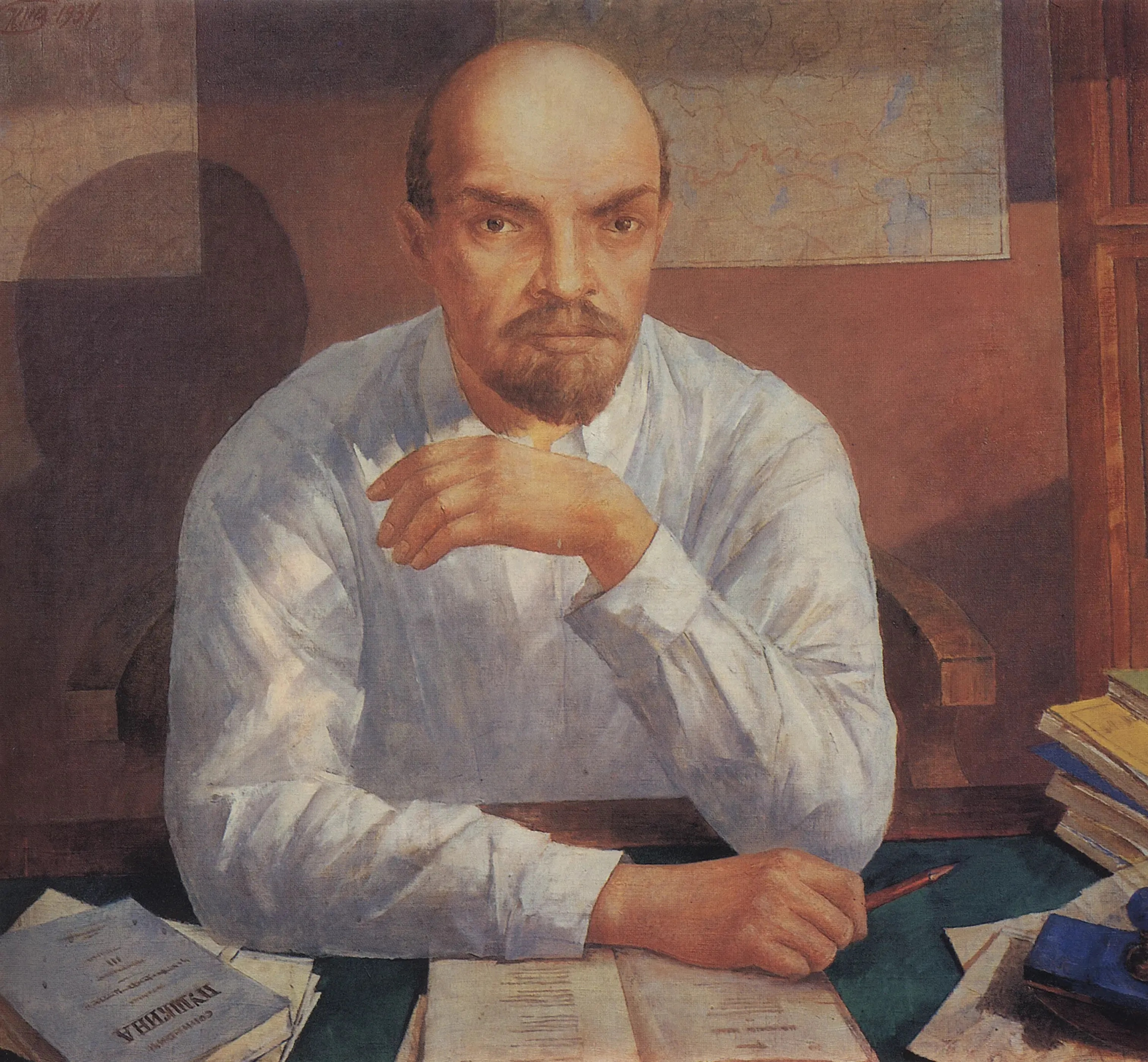
Lenin

== See also ==
- Fine Art of Leningrad

== Bibliography ==
- Ivanov, Sergei. "Unknown Socialist Realism. The Leningrad School". Saint Petersburg, NP-Print, 2007, ISBN 978-5-901724-21-7, ISBN 5-901724-21-6
