= Lev Gumilev =

Soviet historian, ethnologist, and anthropologist (1912–1992)

- Лев Гумилёв
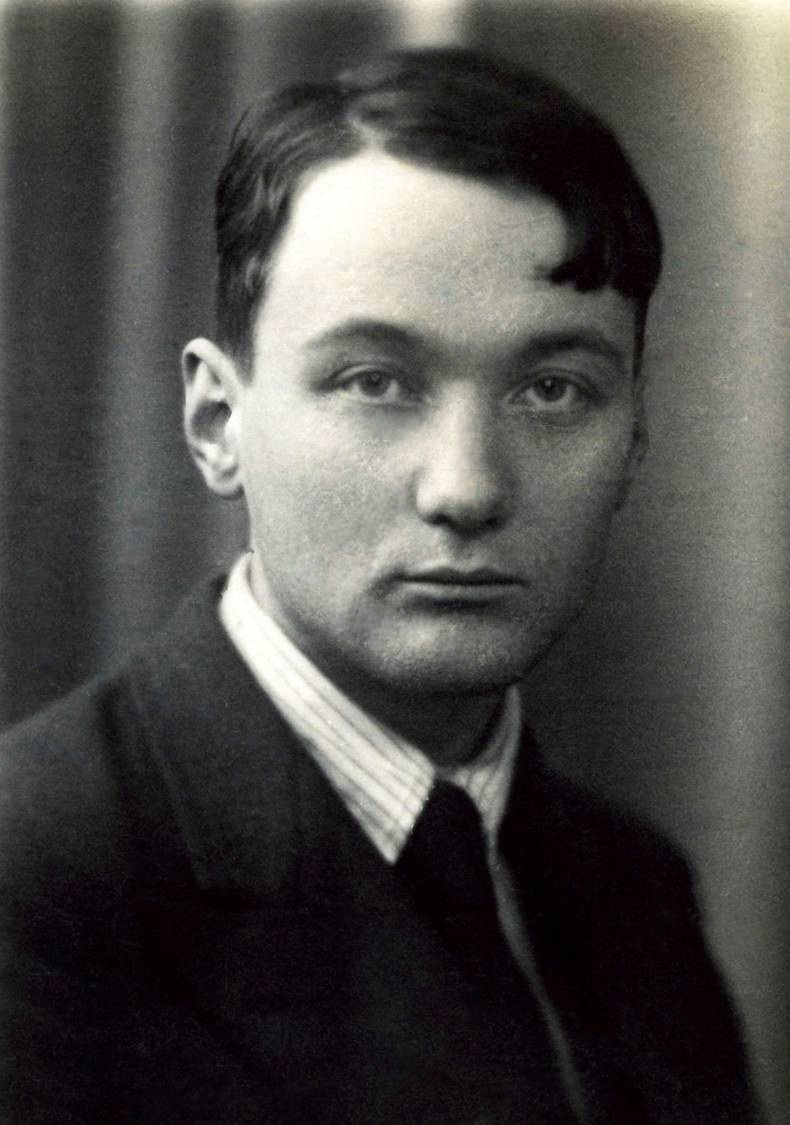
- Gumilev in 1931
- Born: 1 October [O.S. 18 September] 1912; Saint Petersburg, Russian Empire
- Died: 15 June 1992 (aged 79); Saint Petersburg, Russia
- Awards: Order of the Patriotic War; Medal "For the Capture of Berlin"; Medal "For the Victory over Germany in the Great Patriotic War 1941–1945"; Jubilee Medal "Twenty Years of Victory in the Great Patriotic War 1941–1945"; Jubilee Medal "Thirty Years of Victory in the Great Patriotic War 1941–1945"; Jubilee Medal "Forty Years of Victory in the Great Patriotic War 1941–1945"

Education
- Doctoral advisor: Nikolai Kuehner

Philosophical work
- Era: 20th-century philosophy
- Region: Russian philosophy
- School: Eurasianism
- Institutions: Saint Petersburg State University
- Doctoral students: Gelian Prokhorov
- Main interests: Philosophy of history; history; ethnology; turkology; cultural studies; geopolitics; religious studies
- Notable ideas: Eurasianism; passionarity

Lev Nikolayevich Gumilev (also Gumilyov; Russian: Лев Николаевич Гумилёв; 1 October [O.S. 18 September] 1912 – 15 June 1992) was a Soviet and Russian historian, ethnologist, anthropologist, and translator. He had a reputation for his highly unorthodox theories of ethnogenesis and historiosophy. He was an exponent of Eurasianism.

== Life ==
Lev Gumilev's parents, the prominent poets Nikolai Gumilev and Anna Akhmatova, divorced when he was 7 years old and his father was executed by the Cheka when he was just 9. Gumilev spent much of his adulthood, from 1938 until 1956, in Soviet labor camps. He was arrested by the NKVD in 1935 and released, but rearrested and sentenced to five years in 1938. Osip Mandelstam's "Stalin Epigram" is said to have played a role in his arrest. After release, he joined the Red Army and took part in the Battle of Berlin of 1945. However, he was arrested again in 1949 and sentenced to ten years in prison camps. Aiming to secure his freedom, Akhmatova published a dithyramb to Joseph Stalin, which did not help to release Gumilev, although it possibly prevented her own imprisonment. The Soviet secret police had already prepared an order for her arrest, but Stalin decided not to sign it. Relations between Gumilev and his mother became strained, as he blamed her for not helping him enough. She described her feelings about her son's arrest and the period of political repressions in Requiem (published in 1963).

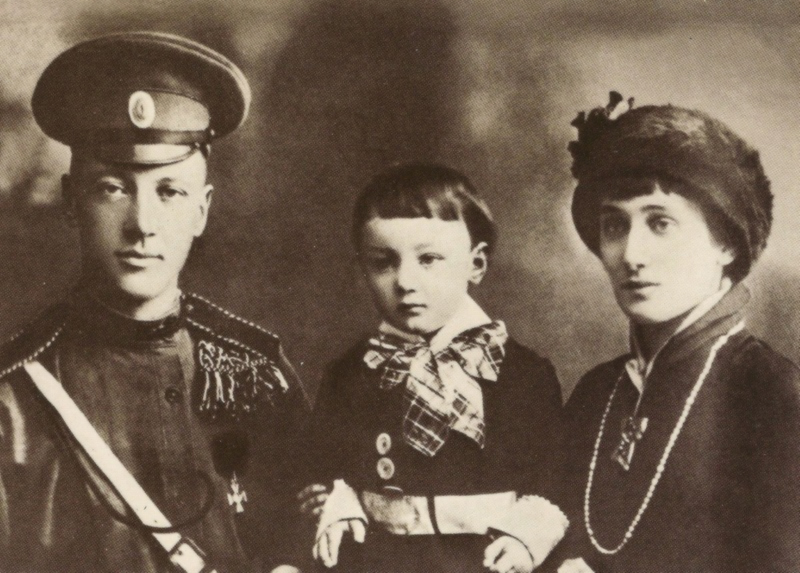
Young Gumilev with his parents in 1913

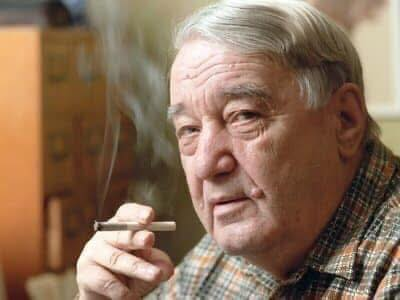
Lev Nikolayevich Gumilev. son of Nikolai Gumilev and Anna Akhmatova.

After Stalin's death in 1953, Gumilev joined the Hermitage Museum, whose director, Mikhail Artamonov, he would accept as his mentor. Under Artamonov's guidance, he became interested in Khazar studies and in steppe peoples in general. In the 1950s and 1960s, he participated in several expeditions to the Volga Delta and to the North Caucasus. He proposed an archeological site for Samandar as well as the theory of the Caspian transgression in collaboration with geologist Alexander Aleksin as one of the reasons for Khazar decline. In 1960, he started delivering lectures at Leningrad University. Two years later, he defended his doctoral thesis on ancient Turks. From the 1960s, he worked in the Geography Institute, where he would defend another doctoral thesis, this time in geography.

Although the official Soviet authorities rejected his ideas and banned most of his monographs from being published, Gumilev came to attract much publicity, especially in the Perestroika years of 1985–1991. As an indication of his popularity, the Kazakh president Nursultan Nazarbayev ordered the L. N. Gumilev Eurasian National University (Евразийский Национальный университет имени Л. Н. Гумилёва, founded in 1996) to be erected just opposite his own palace on the central square of the new Kazakh capital, Astana.

== Ideas ==
Senior researcher in the Department of Ethnology at the University of Tartu, Aimar Ventsel, states the following:

Gumilev's central concept is that of the ethnos. He connected it to the biosphere concept promoted by Academician Vernadsky and came to the conclusion that the ethnos is like a human being: it has its own character, childhood, adulthood and waning period. As people are part of nature, peoples must also follow the laws of nature. Of these, the most important is passionarity, or the vital energy of the ethnos. Passionarity is connected to geography—in other words, ethnic groups that developed in certain climatic and geographical conditions "adapt" to their environment, find their "ecological niche" and become part of the energy of their living environment. Each ethnos has its own "behavioural stereotype", which is passed down from parent to child, and could be considered a national mentality. These stereotypes are like animal reflexes that ensure the preservation of an ethnos. In time, an ethnos develops its own civilisation, which includes religion, manners and norms. Gumilev was never able to explain whether or not a civilisation is a biological phenomenon, but he claimed that people of different races could be part of the same civilisation.

Gumilev theorized that a group of people living in a single place and with a specific way of life and historical experience could over generations form a konviksiya (Russian: конвиксия) or a konsortsiya (Russian: консорция). Such a group then (if it survives) may become a sub-ethnos, with the opportunity of forming successively an ethnos, a super-ethnos, and even a meta-ethnos.

Drawing inspiration from the works of Konstantin Leontyev (1831–1891) and Nikolay Danilevsky (1822–1885), Gumilev regarded Russians as a "super-ethnos" kindred to Turkic-Mongol peoples of the Eurasian steppe. The periods in which Russia has been said to conflict with the steppe peoples were reinterpreted by Gumilev as the periods of consolidation of Russian power with that of the steppe to oppose destructive influences from Catholic Europe, which posed a potential threat to the integrity of Russia. He also saw a distinct Eurasian civilization with there being a unification of the Eurasian peoples around Russia.

In accordance with his pan-Asiatic theories, he supported the national movements of Tatars, Kazakhs and other Turkic peoples, in addition to those of the Mongols and other East Asians. Unsurprisingly, Gumilev's teachings have enjoyed immense popularity in Central Asian countries. In Kazan a monument to him was erected in August 2005.

The historian Mark Bassin stated that Gumilev's theories are scientifically unproven and problematic but that they have a significant impact in a range of Soviet and post-Soviet contexts. Several researchers, such as Vadim Rossman, John Klier, Victor Yasmann, Victor Schnirelmann and Mikhail Tripolsky describe Gumilev's views as anti-Semitic. According to those authors, Gumilev did not extend this ethnological ecumenism to the medieval Jews, whom he regarded as a parasitic, international urban class that had dominated the Khazars and subjected the early East Slavs to the "Khazar Yoke". The last phrase was adapted by him from the traditional term "Tatar Yoke" for the Mongol domination of medieval Russia, a term that Gumilev rejected since he did not necessarily regard the Mongol conquest as a negative event. Instead, he saw the "Tatar yoke" as a military union of the Russians and Tatars.

In particular, he asserted that the Radhanites had been instrumental in the exploitation of East Slavic people and had exerted undue influence on the sociopolitical and economic landscape of the early Middle Ages. Gumilev maintained that the Jewish culture was by nature mercantile and existed outside and in opposition to its environment. According to that view, Jews share a specific way of thinking associated with the moral norms of Judaism. According to Gumilev, the medieval Jews also did not bear arms themselves but waged wars through proxies or mercenaries.

In Kazan, the capital of Tatarstan (Russia), an inscription for a statue in honor of Gumilev quotes the following: "I, a Russian, have been defending the Tatars all my life". About Tatars he said (for example) that "Tatars are in our blood, our history, our language, our worldview. Whatever the real differences with the Russians, the Tatars are not a people outside us, but within us". He called Tatar a "proud name". Tatar historian Gali Yenikeev (among others) has continued with Gumilev's ideas since.

Russian President Vladimir Putin stated during a speech in November 2023: "Alexander Nevsky was given the yarlyk [permission] by Golden Horde khans to rule as prince, primarily so that he could effectively resist the invasion of the West". Gumilev himself expressed similar ideas.

== Influence ==
The "Eurasian vision" of president Vladimir Putin has allegedly been influenced by Gumilev's ideas.

== Personal life ==
Gumilev identified himself as an Orthodox Christian.

Gumilev used to have personal and professional relationships with bibliographer and medievalist Natalia Varbanets.

Gumilev married in 1967, the year after his mother died.

== Works ==
- The Hsiung-nu (1960)
- Ancient Turks (1964)
- Гумилёв, Лев Николаевич (1970). Поиски вымышленного царства: Легенда о государстве пресвитера Иоанна [Searching for an Imaginary Kingdom: The Legend of the Kingdom of Prester John] (in Russian). Moscow: Наука/Nauka.
- The Hsiung-nu in China (1974)
- Ethnogenesis and the Biosphere of Earth (1978)
- Ancient Rus and the Great Steppe (1989)
- An End and a New Beginning (1989)
- From Rus to Russia (1992)
