= Ernest Radlov =

Russian philosopher and historian (1854–1928)

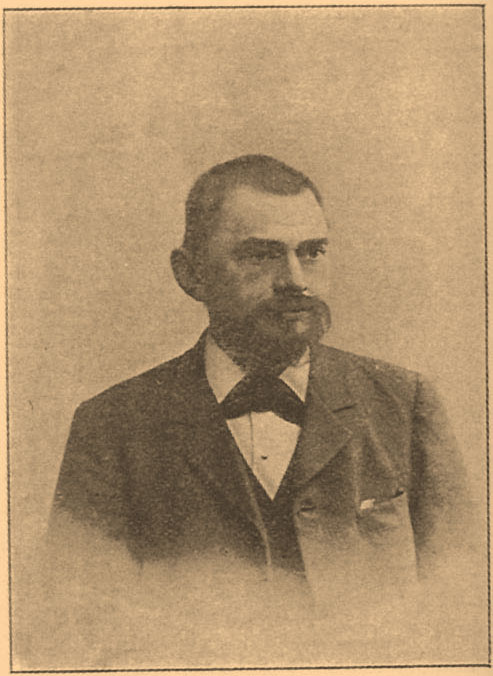
Brockhaus and Efron Encyclopedic Dictionary

Ernest Leopoldovich Radlov or Ernst Radlow (Russian: Эрнест Леопольдович Радлов, 1854–1928) was a Russian neo-Kantian philosopher and historian of philosophy of German origin. Co-founder of the St. Petersburg Philosophical Society, director of the Public Library in Petrograd (1918–1924).

He was also a friend and editor of Vladimir Solovyov.

Radlov introduced Thomas Masaryk to Russian philosophy in conversations over the summer of 1882.

== Works ==
- Etika Aristotelia [Aristotle's Ethics], 1884
- "Ob istolkovanii" Aristotelia [On the interpretation of Aristotle], 1891
- (ed.) Pisʹma [Letters] of Vladimir Solovyov, 3 vols, 1908.
- Solov'eva o svobode voli [Solovyov on free will], 1911
- Ocherk istorii russkoǐ filosofii [Essay on the history of Russian philosophy], 1912. [Translated into German by Margarete Woltner as Russische Philosophie (1925) and into Italian by Ettore Lo Gatto as Storia della filosofia russa (1925).]
- Filosofskiy slovar' [Dictionary of philosophy], 1913
