= Maria Aksenova =

Russian media personality

- Аксёнова Мария Дмитриевна
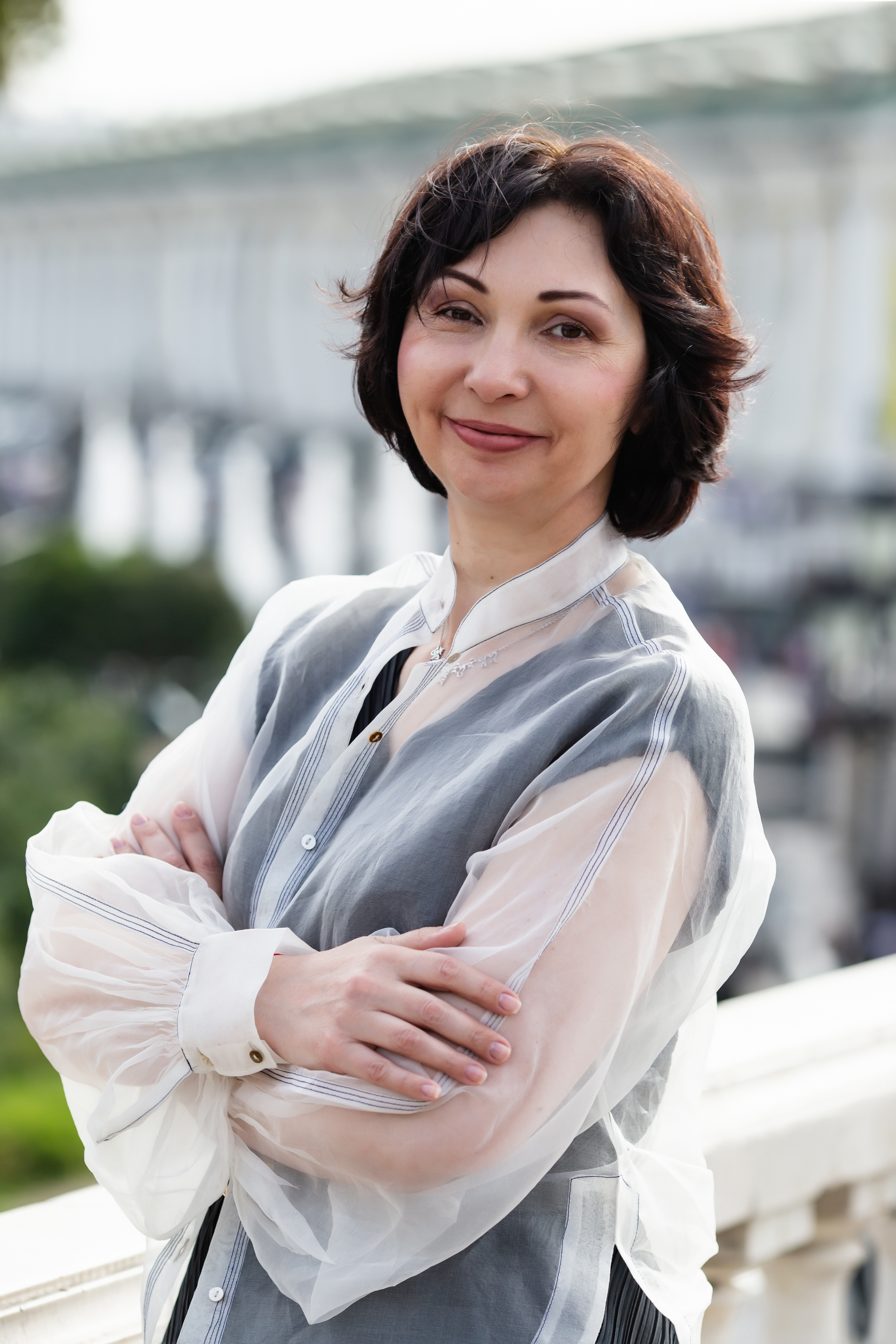
- Born: 23 February; Moscow, USSR
- Education: Moscow State University
- Occupations: Media personality, entrepreneur, publisher, encyclopedist, poet, sportswoman
- Writing career
- Language: Russian
- Notable work: The Encyclopedia for Children

Maria Dmitriyevna Aksenova (born February, 23) is a Russian public figure, media personality, encyclopedist, and businessperson. She is best remembered for her fundamental Encyclopedia for Children, a 63-volume edition of Avanta+ Publishing House (circulation: 20 million copies).

According to books and magazines, Aksenova is a publisher, poet and sportswoman. As of 31 October 2001, she controlled 55% ($16.5 million) of the Publishing House's revenue.

Aksenova was the winner of the Russian President's Award in the field of education (2001); author of educational TV projects, an accredited MVP level investor of Moscow Seed Fund, and academician of the Russian Academy of Natural Sciences.

== Personal life ==
Born and raised in Moscow, USSR, Maria Aksenova graduated from the Moscow school with a Silver medal. She graduated from the MSU Faculty of Mechanics and Mathematics, where she received a first-class degree. Maria studied Executive MBA at RANEPA.

On March 7, 2001, Maria was speaker at the meeting of the President of the Russian Federation V.V. Putin with outstanding business women of Russia.

She studied English and Spanish. Her hobbies are ikebana, travelling (32 countries), rescue diver, old daggers, ethnic jewellery, Qigong.

== Family ==
Her paternal great-grandfather, Pyotr Evdoshenko was a Russian Silver Age poet of the 20th century. Great-grandfather's father, Ivan Evdóshenko was a nobleman and managed some gymnasiums in The Russian Empire.

Her maternal great-grandparents, Alexei Plotnokov and Praskovya Danilova-Plotnikova were among of the leaders of the Revolution Movement in Podmoskovye, Riga and Minusinsk.

== Avanta+ Publishing House ==
External videos
- On September 1, 1997, President of the Russian Federation Boris Yeltsin visited Moscow School No. 1253 and presented several volumes of the Avanta+ Encyclopedia for Children.

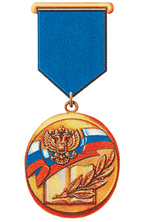
Medal for Prize of the President of the Russian Federation Laureate

At the age of twenty, Maria came up with the idea of creating an encyclopedia for children, comparable to the Great Soviet Encyclopedia. As a student at Moscow State University, she became a co-founder, then the chairman board of directors of the Avanta+, a leading producer of children’s encyclopedias:

- "Encyclopedia for Children Avanta+" (many of them bestsellers at top Russian stores);
- "Modern Encyclopedia";
- "The most beautiful and famous" album book series etc.

Encyclopedia for Children Avanta+ is recommended by the Ministry of General Education of the Russian Federation and the UNESCO Academic department by International Center of Educational Systems (ICES), and is also recognized as a national project.

Maria Aksenova as an author wrote more than 50 popular science introductory and 8 encyclopedic articles in The Encyclopedia for Children.

Nine employees of the Avanta+ Publishing House and Encyclopedia for Children's authors have become laureates of the Russian President's Prize in the field of education. The winners of the Award were: Maria Aksenova, Viktor Volodin, Dmitry Volodikhin, Andrey Gryaznov, Elena Dukelskaya, Lyudmila Petranovskaya, Georgy Khramov, ValerySanyuk.

Publishing House team's mission statement: "We present in an accessible form the sum of all knowledge".

My partners and I were not interested in money for the sake of money, but in business bringing positive changes to the world. In general, I believe that it is possible to speak of a business as successful only if it has both a financial and a social component.

— Maria Aksenova about publishing work.

Maria can look at the problem from different points of view, find some aspects of the phenomenon under consideration that are not obvious at first glance.

— George Hramov, сo-founder Avanta+ Publishing House.

== The Printing Pioneer Fund ==
Since 2007, Maria Aksenova has been the chairman of the board of The Printing Pioneer Fund. Fund activities:

- Educational TV programs;
- Acceleration, exportand other programs for impact-startups;
- International cultural and educational events (ex: International Wiki-Conference 2021).

The Fund became the initiator and creator of the intersectoral impact cluster in The Moscow Innovation Cluster.

== Entrepreneurial and investment activity ==
M. D. Aksenova is a co-founder and investor in a number of projects:

- Sweets Empire Café, Marocana restaurant chain (Moroccan cuisine), Niyama Japanese restaurant chain (franchise, food production, IT, delivery);
- Gayatri Publishing, Avanta+ Publishing House;
- Innovation project: EdTech, HealthTech, etc.

As an investor, she has more than five exits. There are four startup impact in the current portfolio.

== Organizations and business communities ==
Maria Aksenova was and is a member of organizations and business communities:

- Business Women of Russia Confederation;
- New Moscow Entrepreneurs Club;
- a number of Boards of Trustees;
- Russian Supreme Council of Ecology;
- National Independent director Registry (as an Independent director since 2002);
- AngelsDeck Investors Club (since 2020).

== Research work ==
Maria Aksenova is a researcher of the cultural and religious traditions of various countries, the author of a number of publications and speeches. In 1998, Obshchaya Gazeta published two articles on the death of Carlos Castaneda: Viktor Pelevin's "The Last Joke of a Warrior" and Maria Aksenova's "Who Left This World?".

Maria Aksenova tells about unknown details of Classics writers' fates and their works in her book – "Do We Know Everything About the Classics of World Literature?" (ISBN 978-5-227-07865-0).

=== Poetry ===
A book combining a collection of poems "Cascade Splashes" of the Silver Age poet, Peter Evdóshenko, and a collection of poems "Blues of Emptiness" of his great-granddaughter Maria Aksenova was published in 2007 (ISBN 5-98396-010-5).

=== Do We Know Russian? ===
In 2008-2012, Maria Aksenova and her colleagues conducted work on the study of the history of Russian words, names, adages. The work resulted in a cycle of television programs, events and books:

- 168 episodes of "Do Russians know Russian?" TV show;
- Three-Volume Edition "Do We Know Russian?" (1st volume: ISBN 978-5-227-03682-7; 2nd volume: ISBN 978-5-227-03330-7; 3rd volume: ISBN 978-5-227-03747-3 and 2nd combined edition: ISBN 978-5-227-07086-9). In 2012, the 1st and 2nd volumes was shortlisted for the Enlightener Prize by the Dynasty Foundation;
- meetings with readers and schoolboys.

== On TV, Films and Radio ==
Author's and acting works:

- 2003 – "The Taming of the Success" talk show (TDK TV channel)
- 2006 – "Outlook beyond the MKAD" on Moscow Speaking radio station;
- 2008-2010 – a series of documentaries "A Novel in Stone" ("World masterpieces of love");
- 2008-2010 – poetic art videos based on the poems of Russian poets;
- 2008-2012 – 168 episodes of "Do Russians know Russian?" TV show.

=== Selected filmography ===
Year	Title	Role	Notes
2010-2011	Institute of noble maidens	Matryona	(ru, 519 episodes)
2013	Puppeteers	Senior lieutenant Maria Chub	Russian: Кукловоды
2014	House at the River	Veronika	Russian: Домик у реки, romanized: Domic u reki

== Sport ==
- 1980s – finalist of the national championship, 4-time champion of Moscow Russian Draughts.
- 2000s – PADI Rescue Diver.

== Awards and honors ==
- Laureate of the Russian President's Prize in the field of education for the development of a scientific and methodological concept for the presentation of educational materials and the creation on its basis of the fundamental book series the Encyclopedia for Children (2001).
- Winner of Manager of the Year award in the nomination "Publishing Business" (2001, Kommersant Publishing House).
- Among the Top 100 businessperson of the rating "Who manages the finances of Russia" in 2001 – the first and only woman.

== Works cited ==
- Marina Belova, Ludmila Chernova (2007). Персона России: литературно-биографический альманах [Person of Russia: literary and biographical almanac] (in Russian). Moscow: Elite-Press Plus, Border Publishing Group. pp. 24–25. ISBN 978-5-94691-270-9.
- Ralph Hübner (2007). Who is who в России. Биографическая энциклопедия успешных людей России [Who is who in Russia. Biographical encyclopedia of successful people in Russia]. Encyclopedia of Personalities by Hübner Who is who (in Russian) (1st ed.). Moscow: Ralph Hübner. p. 68. ISBN 978-3-7290-0063-6.
- Ksenia Lipinskaya (1974). Далеко в заснеженной Сибири [Far away in snowy Siberia] (in Russian) (3rd ed.). Krasnoyarsk: Krasnoyarsk Book Publishing House. pp. 54, 58.
