= Bychkov =

Bychkov (Russian: Бычков), and its feminine form Bychkova (Russian: Бычко́ва), is a Russian surname that has been borne by, among others:

- Alexander Bychkov (born 1988), Russian serial killer
- Ekaterina Bychkova (born 1985), Russian tennis player
- Mikhail Bychkov (1926–1997), Russian ice hockey player
- Nadiya Bychkova (born 1989), Ukrainian dancer
- Semyon Bychkov (conductor) (born 1952), Russian-American conductor
- Semyon Trofimovich Bychkov (1918–1946), Russian military pilot
- Viktor Bychkov (disambiguation), multiple people

== See also ==
- 16783 Bychkov (1996 XY25), a Main-belt Asteroid discovered in 1996
- Ivan Bytchkov, a minor character in GTA IV
