= Vyacheslav Ivanov's work =

Writings by the Russian author

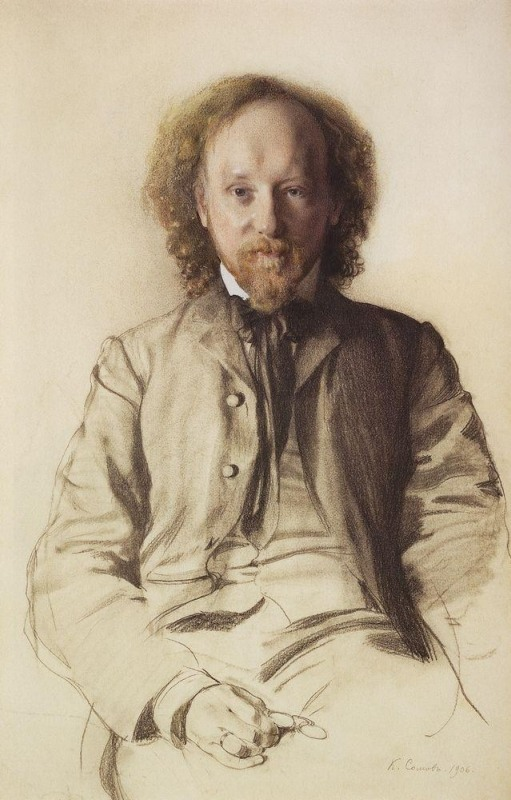
Vyacheslav Ivanov. Portrait by K. Somov (1906) (Note: Created by request of N. P. Ryabushinsky and first published in № 3 of the magazine "Zolotoye Runo" for 1907. It is now stored in the Tretyakov Gallery.)

The creative legacy of Vyacheslav Ivanov (1866-1949) includes a large corpus of original and translated poetic works, journalism, philosophical essays, literary and antiquarian monographs. Ivanov created an original version of Russian Symbolism, which combined two general trends of the Silver Age: first, to return Russian culture to the spiritual foundations of Christianity; second, to reinterpret and recreate the artistic archetypes of Antiquity, the Middle Ages, and the Renaissance. In 1900-1920 V. Ivanov actively preached the "choral" beginning of culture. He set the task of overcoming individualism through myth-creative willful art to "sobornost" — to the over-individual religious community of people. These tendencies intensified during World War I and the Russian Revolution of 1917. At the same time, Ivanov was engaged in educational activities, expressed in particular in translations of the tragedies of Aeschylus, the poetry of Dante, Petrarch and Michelangelo. His antiquarian works, devoted mainly to the cult of Dionysus, are closely connected with his spiritual and literary quest.

After his emigration to Italy, Ivanov took a marginal position in European thought, minimizing his communication with Russian emigrants. In 1926, he joined the Catholic Church, without breaking with Orthodoxy, and tried to convey the meaning of Fyodor Dostoyevsky's works to a Western audience. Towards the end of his life, Ivanov wrote the epic "The Story of Svetomir the Tsarevich", which was to summarize his entire work and reflect the complexity of the spiritual life of man as God's creation and the coming resurrection of Russia, "which has gone to the rest of the Lord".

The archival heritage of Vyacheslav Ivanov has been preserved in its entirety, but is concentrated in several research centers in Moscow, St. Petersburg and Rome. The Vyacheslav Ivanov Research Center, which has digitized 95% of all the materials preserved in his apartment museum, is located in the Italian capital. In 1971-1987, thanks to the efforts of his heirs: his son Dmitry Vyacheslavovich (1912-2003) and the poet's last companion Olga Schor (1894-1978): four volumes of his collected works were published. The publication of Ivanov's extensive correspondence and other materials left by him continues.

== Ivanov as a symbolist poet ==
=== "Lodestars" ===
Ivanov's first collection of poems, "Lodestars", was long in preparation: it contained sketches and texts written before leaving for Germany and then in Berlin. The collection, "blessed" by V. S. Solovyov, was dedicated to the memory of Ivanov's mother, who had prophesied a poetic path for him. The book was published by the Suvorin's printing house in 1902, although the title page on the majority of copies is dated 1903. In literary studies, this book is placed on the same level as "Gold in Azure" by Andrei Bely and "Verses on the Beautiful Lady" by A. Blok — it was a transition to the aesthetic contemplation of the highest sphere of the spirit in Russian poetry. The poetic intentions in this book go back to the European quests of the scientist Ivanov, but his own theoretical insights are presented as deeply intimate inner experiences, in which mind and sensual flash are indistinguishable. This is where the fusion of the "native" and the "universal" comes into play. Ivanov lamented the inadequate reception of his first book, the accusations of "bookishness", "deadness", and the difficulties of language. In fact, broadening the range of lyrical experience required new means of poetic expression - a symbolic language capable of conveying religious and aesthetic universals. Ivanov immediately declared: "Poetic language must be distinguished from everyday language and approach the language of the gods - the primordial Logos. As a result, the main images-symbols of "Lodestars" are taken from the cultural baggage of "departed cultures": ancient, medieval and renaissance, while the syntax and lexicon were strongly influenced by the 18th century, and especially by Trediakovsky.

The German-American researcher Michael Wachtel separately raised the question of when and why Ivanov became a "symbolist". From the point of view of literary criticism, Ivanov belonged to the "young symbolists" (he was seven years older than Bryusov — the head of the Symbolist movement in Russia), but in the correspondence of Vyacheslav Ivanovich and Lydia Dmitrievna Zinovieva-Annibal this word is almost never found. From this M. Vachtel concluded that the author of "Lodestars" did not consider himself a "Symbolist" and became a Russian Symbolist when he fully defined the meaning of this concept for himself. "Lodestars" (1902-1903) and "Transparency" (1904) (Ivanov's first collections of poems) were created and prepared for publication outside any literary environment against the background of a wandering life. At the same time, the first thinker who pointed out the closeness of Ivanov's poetry to Symbolist movement was its implacable enemy — V. S. Solovyov, who read one of his parodies of Brusov in his presence. Ivanov himself, with undoubted respect for Valery Bryusov, who introduced him to the world of Russian literature and began to print, was rather skeptical of his ideals of the innovator. Ivanov respected Brusov as an enterprising cultural figure. Ivanov also rarely used the term "decadence", and always in the sense of a negative phenomenon. The discrepancy between Ivanov and Brusov in their views on symbolism and art in general was important for the development of Russian culture in the early XX century as a whole. For example, neither Ivanov nor Zinovieva-Annibal were interested in the "new" for the sake of novelty alone. In 1902, when Vyacheslav Ivanovich was introduced to the work of Verlaine, Lydia Dmitrievna emphasized that they were "beautiful poems"; on the same basis Ivanov then praised Minsky and Balmont: he liked them for themselves, not for their "novelty". In creativity, the 30-year-old Ivanov saw (as he did much later, as an 80-year-old emigrant in Rome) the expression of universal truths rather than self-expression.

=== "Cor ardens" ===
Ivanov's two-volume poetry collection "Cor ardens" ("The Flaming Heart") was actually the result of a long journey, uniting five separate poetry books and over 350 poems. It was originally conceived in 1905, but due to a series of circumstances it saw the light of day in "Scorpion" in 1911-1912. "Cor ardens" is the last book for the poet Ivanov; many of the works that comprise it were part of the cycles that preceded it. If one reads the two volumes one after the other, one finds that motivic, rhythmic, and formal overlaps organize a single text with many cross-cutting plots. The title comes from the metaphor of the poem "Praise to the Sun", which opens the inner cycle "Sun-Heart". Ivanov's feelings for Sergei Gorodetsky and Margarita Sabashnikova formed the cycle "Eros", which was preceded by a small collection of the same name. However, the two-volume collection also contained a political layer (the cycle "Arcana", i.e. "Sacrament"), apocalyptically interpreted, which is set by an epigraph of Agrippa of Nettesheim. Agrippa was much favored by Brusov, to whom the cycle is dedicated. According to the German mystic, in 1900 A.D. a new world ruler, Ophiel, will begin to rule the universe. It is not surprising that the main leitmotifs of this cycle were the appearance of a new man in the new century and the characterization of this century; in a deep sense it was close to Brusov's "The Coming Huns".

The overarching theme of the cycle is the description of the experience of God, the personal mystical experience, and the transformation of the personality that is associated with it. The central image of the "Sun-Heart" belonged to several traditions, of which Nietzsche's symbolism from "Thus Spoke Zarathustra" was the leading one, but the solar theme of Russian modernism was also present. The poem "Knots of the Serpent" clearly developed Dantean imagery, when the Christian idea of resurrection after suffering is juxtaposed with the Dionysian idea of sin as a path to God (Ivanov perceived sin as suffering), all of which was hinted at in the poem "The Cross of Evil" from the previous book Transparency. In this context, the motif of "The Sun of Emmaus" appears, as well as the phrase "Cor ardens" (a quotation from the Latin Vulgate from the episode of Christ's appearance in Emmaus). The eponymous section is a collection of poems on the unity of mystical experience in Christianity and Dionysianism; most of these poems are dedicated to philosophers, including Sergei Bulgakov and Nikolai Berdyaev.

The experiences of "Hafiz circle" also found a place in "The Flaming Heart". Poems were written for the meetings, two of which were included in Ivanov's book, forming the small cycle "Hafiz's Tent"; the third poem was included by O. Shor in the notes to the cycle. Shor in the notes to the cycle. Two other poems -"Petronius redivivivus" and "Anachronism"- reflected the names of cycles (Petronius and Reenouveau by W. Nouvel, Antinous by M. Kuzmin). In the poem "Hyperion's Complaint" (Hyperion is one of Ivanov's "Haphysite" names), the lyrical hero denounces his "tormentors" - friends for being preoccupied only with eroticism and drinking wine, while Hyperion himself receives only "evil splinters" and "fierce stings" — "arrows in the inheritance of Erot". The motifs of the previous solar cycle are repeated here, including the martyrdom of the Sun.

=== Myth and music. Melopeia "The Man" ===
Vyacheslav Ivanov's interest in the mystery side of ancient and later world culture was already established during his Berlin years. In E. Zeller's book on Greek philosophy (preserved in Ivanov's library), a large section was devoted to the Pythagoreanism, whose union was defined as "an organization of mysteries" held in the form of an orgy. Zeller emphasized that Pythagoreanism was a variant of theology because its philosophy was based on mysticism and belief in revelation. This basis was fully realized in Ivanov's anti-Christian works of the 1910-1920s, including the book "The Hellenic Religion of the Suffering God" (1917) and his doctoral dissertation "Dionysus and Pradionysianism" (Baku, 1923); in addition, some of the ideas were expressed as early as 1913 in the article "On Orphic Dionysus". According to F. F. Zelinsky, Ivanov believed that the Dionysian religion revealed the internal logic of Pythagoreanism and transformed Pythagoreanism into Orphism, making it a form of theology (the "whole" was formed from the parts of Dionysus that were torn by the Titans). In modern culture, Vyach. Ivanov associated the dominance of the Dionysian principle with the ecstatic nature of musical states of the soul, and the Apollonian principle with visionarity. The synthesis of these beginnings is an analog of the harmony of the world reflected in the state of the soul. The dominance of monologism (harpsichord-piano) in European music, which has displaced choral polyphony, must be gradually overcome.

In his own poetic work, Ivanov reflected these initial positions in accordance with A. N. Veselovsky's theories of the lyric as an alloy of melos, logos, and word. Veselovsky introduced the problem of harmony into this series: poetry, according to him, develops from the choral beginning. It is not surprising that the principle of organizing a lyric text on the basis of dialogical choral parts is highly characteristic of Ivanov. His favorite genres were odes, hymns, psalms, and dithyrambs, which have a melodic basis and use the practice of ecstatic rapture, dialogicity, and the sound of choruses. Ivanov introduced the concept of the symphonic principle, by which he understood the architectonics of the whole, organized by the variation of themes, leitmotifs, sound repetitions, and the creation of rhythmic dynamics with the dominance of the collective choral beginning or the leading "voice" in the dialogue, as in ancient tragedy or lyric.

Vyacheslav Ivanov's way of connecting and realizing myth and logos is melos-harmony. A related concept is pneumatology, the doctrine of the all-penetrating and all-forming spirit-pneuma (Greek: πνεύμα). In his books on Dionysianism, Ivanov wrote about transcending reality through various forms of ecstasy; the latter allows one to reach a state of divine inspiration, as Euripides and Plato wrote ("Ion": 533e-535a, 542a), "Phaedrus": 244b-e, 245a-b). The idea of melos-pneuma was fully realized in "Lodestars": in the principles of architectonics, rhythmic-melodic laws, and versioning strategies. The further development of these principles was Melopeia, as Ivanov called his philosophical poem "Man", the main part of which was written in 1915. S. Titarenko called Melopeia one of his greatest experimental creations. It is noteworthy that in Ivanov's aesthetics the concept of melopeia never received a definite justification and remained conventional. This concept comes from ancient musical aesthetics and goes back to the roots of μελοποιία - "composition of songs" and at the same time music to songs. The root μέλος has several meanings: the first is "song, lyric, melody, harmony"; the second is "member". Related is the verb μελíζω, "to dismember, dissect". Plato and Aristotle used these words in the context of thinking about rhythm and structure. In Plato's "Pyrus" there is a judgment that the Eros of the muse Urania requires the art of melopeia, and when structure and rhythm have to be conveyed to people, either by composing music or by correctly reproducing harmonies and sizes already composed, this task is also called melopeia, requiring extreme labor and great art (Symposium, 187c). Something similar is treated in the "Republic" (III, 398d).

Vyacheslav Ivanov worked on his melopeia in parallel with his scientific works on Dionysus and Pradionysianism and Orphism. The poem was built on a Pythagorean-Orphic musical basis, which is indicated by the transformation of individual poems into strophes designated by Greek letters, with the allocation of acme (ακμή) according to the principle of sound order, based on rising and falling tones. He wrote about the same to S. K. Makovsky and depicted it in special schemes: two polar rhythmic-melodic lines of verses are organized by correspondence and symmetry according to the principle of strophe-antistrophe (12 verses). The following 17 verses with counterpoint are symbolized by a triangle, and the сrown of sonnets (15 verses) is based on the circle as a principle of return. The circle embodies harmony, wholeness and completeness in the epilogue. The poem "Man" is based on the parallel conduct of the theme, its intertwining, in the second part they unite and reach acme, and in the third and written in 1919 the fourth part of the leitmotif themes "rotate" and lead to a circular epilogue — a chorus that completes the symphony of the whole.

=== Winter Sonnets ===
The impossibility of soborny way of creating and living a world of mystery in a godless reality became clear to Ivanov in the first post-revolutionary years. The lyrical result was a cycle of twelve "Winter Sonnets", which later critics recognized as one of the highlights of his work. Their external content reflected the hardships of life under the conditions of civil war and devastation, the illness of his wife and son. The reason for writing the sonnets was the hospitalization of his wife Vera and son Dmitry in the sanatorium "Serebryany Bor", which was located outside the city at that time, and Vyacheslav Ivanovich had to travel a considerable distance by sleigh in the winter cold and off-road to visit them. The central image of the sonnets was the "winter of the soul" - the existential state of the lyrical hero, in which he begins to perceive his own physical body only as his double. Only the God-seeking "I" can overcome the gap between the physical and spiritual bodies and find the way to himself. The journey through the winter landscape is a metaphor for the soul's search for a higher meaning; movement on the plane of life has no meaning, or its meaning is not true; the element of the soul is vertical. D. P. Svyatopolk-Mirsky in his history of Russian literature referred "Winter Sonnets", as well as correspondence with M. O. Gershenzon, to "the most important monuments of the epoch". At the same time, he contrasted the sonnets with Ivanov's earlier poetic work: unlike the inaccessible "Alexandrian" poetry, the "Winter Sonnets" are less metaphysical, more simple and human in language. Cold and hunger appeared as elemental enemies of the undying spiritual fire, which, however, has yet to survive. In an article written in 1922, Svyatopolk-Mirsky said that if Vyach Ivanov wrote only "Winter Sonnets", it would be enough to consider him "the most precious poet of our time." In terms of perfection he compared this cycle to Blok's "The Twelve," but it is perfection of a different order — high asceticism and purity of the individual spirit. "This is the courage of a man purified to the last purity, facing death, Nonexistence and Eternity". Anna Akhmatova much later claimed that Ivanov was able "in 1919, when we were all silent, to transform his feelings into art, now that means something".

=== "Roman Sonnets" ===
On December 31, 1924, Vyacheslav Ivanov wrote to Mikhail Gershenzon from Rome that his "rhymes have awakened. The poet had long been aware of the connection between his fate and that of the Eternal City, which he probably thought of in terms of an entrance into eternity. He repeatedly said that he had come to Rome to die. According to A. B. Shishkin, this formula should be understood not literally, but as a declaration of renunciation of modernity, the end of the era or transition to a new stage of existence. In November–December 1924, in Rome, Ivanov wrote a cycle of "Roman Sonnets", which was conceived as a continuation and contrast to the most tragic of the cycle "De Profundis amavi", written in the summer of 1920, during the death throes of Vera Shvarsalon-Ivanova. The cycle of "Roman Sonnets" occupied an exceptional place in the mature work of Ivanov himself and in the entire Russian poetic tradition: neither before nor after the "Roman" poetic cycles were created. However, this cycle, to a certain extent, summarized the whole of Ivanov's poetic work. For example, the phrase "Rome" — "pilgrim", which opens the first stanzas of the I "Roman Sonnet" and is repeated in the stanzas of the tercets of the concluding VIII Sonnet, was already found in the early sketches about Italy and Rome in 1892.

In the spirit of Vladimir Solovyov, the image of the ancient Roman arches that open the stanzas of the first sonnet is mythopoetically conceived as a symbol of universality. In the following poems of the cycle, the names of the real objects that open up to the traveler from the Appian Way and the Aurelian Walls itself refer to a higher meaning, which Ivanov himself called "the most real. The play of reality and higher meanings hierarchically superimposed on it is characteristic of the entire cycle. In the sonnet "Regina Viarum" (which opens the cycle), the lyrical hero appears to the reader on the Appian Way, "the queen of paths," then on the Quirinal Hill ("Monte Cavallo"), from where he walks, passing the "Street of the Four Fountains" ("L'acqua felice"), where Ivanov rented an apartment nearby, in house 172, to the Spanish Square to the fountain tower ("La Barcaccia"); from there to Piazza Barberini to the Fontana del Tritone, then to the Roman medieval Ghetto to the Fountain of the Turtles ("La Fontana delle Tartarughe"), up to the Temple of Asclepius, reflected in a lake ("Valle Giulia"), descends to the Trevi Fountain ("Aqua Virgo"), and finally climbs again to the Pincian Hill, where the view of Rome and the St. Peter's Basilica is magnificent. The description of a real, albeit long, journey is intended to be read in different ways. Biographically, it is the completion of the earthly wanderings and the acquisition of Rome, the Queen of Ways ("Regina Viarum"). Textually, this is emphasized by the movement from the arches to the basilica, the last word of the cycle with capital letter. The path leads to the symbol of unity and Christian universalism. More profoundly, the Virgilian myth of the founding of Rome by the people of Troy is alluded to, and the multitude of wells - the element of water, the Dionysian beginning. The image of the fountain concealed other meanings: in Rome, fountains were often decorated with ancient sarcophagi - containers for ashes. By combining the sarcophagus with the Slavic treasure-house fountain, Ivanov gave the image of the tomb the meaning of both depth and vital movement. As usual for a symbolist poet, in "Roman Sonnets" a great semantic load was carried by the color scheme. The symbol of Golden Rome is the dominant color of gold and the sun and its shades: honey, fire, fire, as well as blue, green, orange, red, blue, bronze and silver — all associated with sacred space.

The rhymes of the cathedrals in the first sonnet form the name of the Eternal City in Russian ("Rome", lines 1, 3, 5, 7) and Latin transcription ("Roma", lines 2, 4, 6, 8). The solemn tone of the rhymes, according to A. Shishkin, indicates that the enemies were trying to destroy not only the Eternal City, but also its name; that is why the apotheosis of the Roman name is contrasted with the "word war" of the barbarians and emphasized by the shades of vowels and consonants. Ivanov was also generous with mythological-poetic palindromes: Latin "Roma"-"Amor", and Russian "Rome"-"World". The rhyme "Roma" — "domo" is significant for the whole cycle: in Italian domo means "dome", "cathedral", as well as "heavenly vault"; probably the last word of the IX, the concluding sonnet, "Dome", serves as the last word of this band.

=== Ivanov's symbolic aesthetics ===
In his theoretical works, Ivanov was consistent, rigorous, and scientific in his consideration of the essence of symbolism in general and of Russian symbolism in particular. He worked with the concepts of dialectics: "thesis", "antithesis" and "synthesis". For Ivanov, the essence of the first point lay in the infinitely diverse reality of another, higher being suddenly revealed to the artist's inner gaze in a series of correspondences (Baudelaire's correspondences), i.e. in a symbol. Russian Symbolism, according to Ivanov, did not want to and could not be "only art", its mission is theurgy, but before the realization of the theurgic task the symbolists will have to test "antithesis" (the sensitivity of Vrubel's nature in general led him to madness). Ivanov himself, as Berdyaev put it, "without a sense of the catastrophic," had a vision of the highest stage of symbolism — the synthetic stage. In order to understand this stage, Ivanov significantly introduced the concept of the "internal canon", which, as in the Middle Ages, should significantly discipline the modern artist (i.e. the symbolist) and bring him to a fundamentally new level not only of art and not so much of being. Ivanov followed Solovyov: at the synthetic stage of symbolism, the artist transcends traditional art and becomes a theologian. On the basis of deep contemplation of the integral and unified essence of being (the soul of the world, the flesh of the word, i.e. in the flesh of Christ who remains after the Resurrection), the theologian creates a new being, more sublime and spiritual than the existing one. In terms of aesthetics, this is the "great style," and its true embodiment is the coming sacred artistic mystery, which will emerge on the basis of the traditional epic and tragedy. Mystery is the ultimate goal and meaning of the entire Symbolist movement, the basis of a new level of human culture. When Ivanov expressed this idea in 1910, it frightened both Brusov and Blok. Ivanov himself saw no real prospects for the realization of the mysterious promise. Blok, after the revolution of 1917, according to V. V. Bychkov, associated the mystery theology with the Russian revolution and placed Christ in a "white wreath of roses" at its head. The other thinkers of Ivanov's circle (Andrei Bely, Merezhkovsky, Frank) perceived his ideas skeptically and even ironically.

In his 1936 article "Symbolism" for the 31st volume of the "Treccani", Ivanov finally crystallized his theory. In this article he characterized his symbolism as subjective (Italian: simbolismo soggettivistico). Ivanov wrote that "in its aspiration from the externally visible and objectively existing reality to a higher reality, more real in the ontological sense (lat. a realibus ad realiora), realistic symbolism in its own way realized the "anagogic precept of medieval aesthetics" — the elevation of man from the sensual and through the medium of the sensual to the spiritual reality". Subjective symbolism prevailed in Western culture, which recognized the objective as less attractive than the artist's fiction. Realistic symbolism, Ivanov believed, was the only form of preserving and developing myth as the deep content of the symbol understood as reality. Myth as a sacred reality is revealed to the collective consciousness in the act of mystery (in antiquity: Eleusinian, Samothrace, etc.). After being passed on to the folk-historical heritage, the myth becomes a myth in the full sense of the word. A true myth is devoid of the personal characteristics of the creator or the listener, because it is an objective form of storing knowledge about reality, acquired as a result of mystical experience and believed until, in the act of a new breakthrough to the same reality, a new knowledge of a higher level is discovered about it. Thus the old myth is replaced by a new one. That is why Ivanov said that the supertask of symbolism is myth-making. We are not talking about the artistic processing of ancient myths or the writing of fiction, but about true myth-making - a mental achievement of the artist.

According to Ivanov, the artist is not able to create outside of the connection with the divine unity, and he has to educate himself to the realization of this connection. Myth is an event of inner experience, "personal in arena, suprapersonal in content," and only then, through the artist's mediation, is it experienced by all. Ideally, myth-making should be realized in a special form of art — a new mystery. Ivanov thought that it would arise and develop on the basis of the theater, but it would outgrow the ramp and the stage. Ivanov assumed that theater arose from the Dionysian mysteries as an artistic embodiment of the mystical experience of sobornost. The chorus in the ancient theater played the role and function in its principle. According to Ivanov, it was in the folkloric memory of the soul that the sobornost's religious experience was preserved in modernity. That is why Vyacheslav Ivanovich was particularly interested in the origins of Slavic peoples.

Ivanov saw the paradigm of the coming mystery as a sacred action uniting actors and spectators as full participants; the liturgical service is a direct analogy. Already in 1914, several years before P. Florensky, in an article on Čiurlionis, Ivanov wrote about the liturgical service as a historical realization and prototype of the future synthesis of the arts. The closest, according to Ivanov, was Scriabin. In other words, Ivanov's aesthetics was entirely in the sphere of the religious and constantly led him to considerations of a new religious consciousness and spiritual and an adequate aesthetic practice.

== Vyacheslav Ivanov's religious and philosophical searches ==
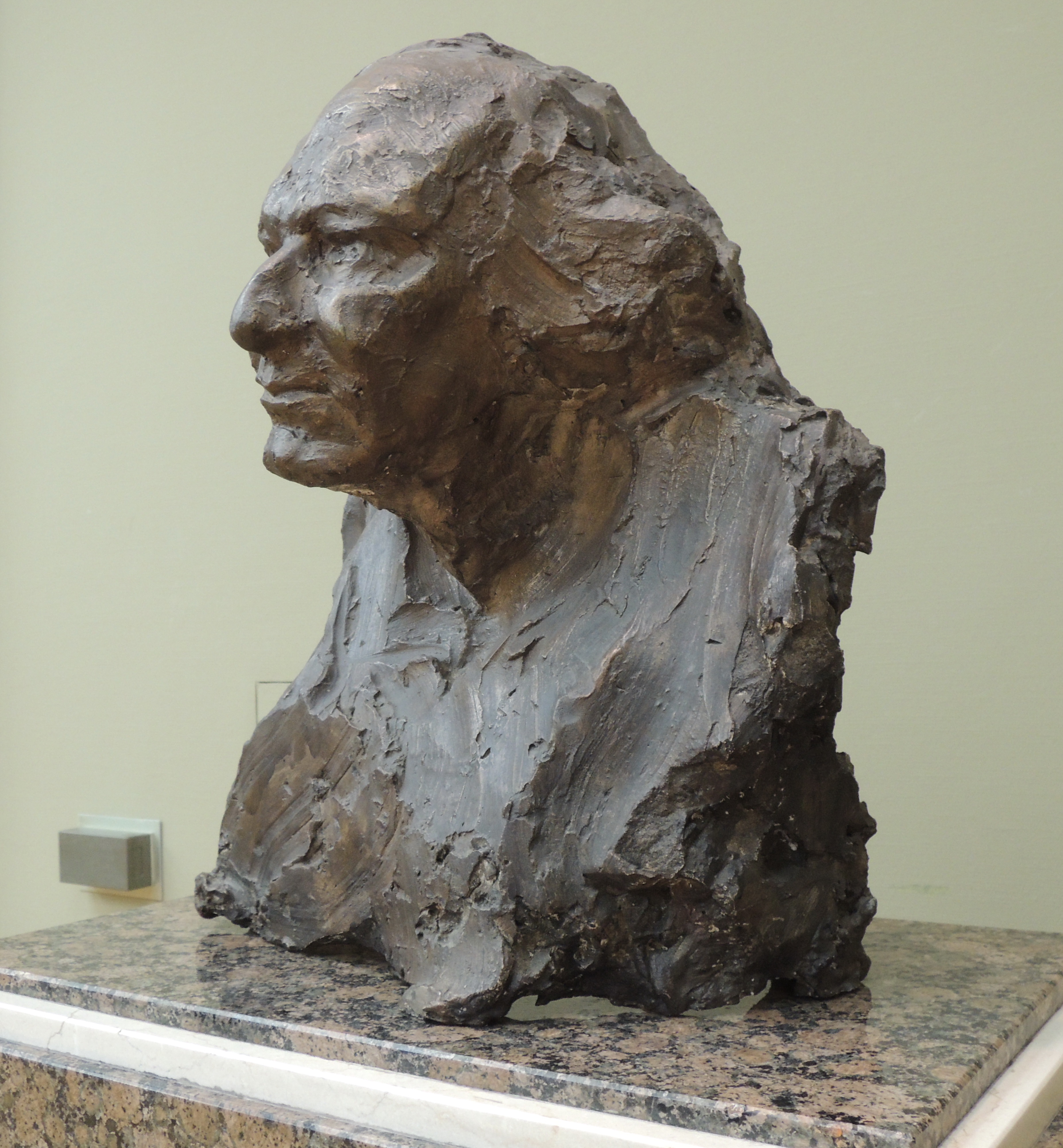
Anna Golubkina. Portrait of Vyacheslav Ivanov, 1914. Museum-workshop of A. С. Golubkina

=== Ivanov and the Religious and Philosophical Society ===
The activity of the Religious and Philosophical Society (RPS) is inseparable from the legacy of the "Tower"; moreover, the members of the RPS and the most frequent speakers there were active participants of Ivanov's meetings. According to the calculations of A. A. Ermichev (RCHGA), Vyach. Ivanov spoke at the RFO 8 times, D. Merezhkovsky 9 times, D. Filosofov and A. Kartashev 10 times each, V. Rozanov 6 times, N. Berdyaev 4 times. V. Ern, F. Zelinsky, and the then young F. Stepun also made reports, and among the full members of the Society were E. Gertsyk, Z. Gippius, S. Bulgakov, V. Beneshevich, and many others, including Meyerhold and A. Mintslova. Ivanov was personally involved in the creation of the Section for the Study of the History, Philosophy, and Mysticism of Christianity, and he himself chose the problems to be discussed and directed the strategy and tactics of the discussions. The Section had 30 full members and 54 associate members, and in the period 1909-1912 some meetings were held in Ivanov's apartment in the "Tower". There is no definite information about when Vyach. Ivanov first appeared at the meetings of the RFO. Perhaps it happened on February 3, 1908, when V. Ern spoke about "The Idea of Christian Progress". The problems discussed differed from those advocated by Merezhkovsky and Philosofov: the question of the limits of the church and freedom in Russian Orthodoxy stood out sharply. Ivanov reported about his position in those years in a letter to E. Shor in 1933:

I wanted to be understandable and acceptable to a diverse group of people. Most of them were non-believers in the sense of positive religion. I wanted to speak "with Hellenes in the Hellenic way", based on the tendency to "mystically colored" speculations peculiar to the time, while I myself was already on the ground of positive, even ecclesiastical Christianity, of which I spoke openly only in the "Christian section" of the St. Petersburg Religious-Philosophical Society, of which I was the chairman.

At the same time, Ivanov presented his report "On the Church" only in February 1910, but neither the report itself nor its drafts have survived. At that time he clearly opposed Rozanov and Merezhkovsky on the question of the inadmissibility of discussions about the Third Testament, contrasting them with his eternal poetic and mythological concept of Earth-Mother. Ivanov's report was probably connected with his cycle of lectures on Dostoevsky, in which he argued about the agiology and demonology of Fyodor Mikhailovich and the doctrine of the rebirth of the state into the Church (Conversation in Zosima's Cell, The Brothers Karamazov, book 2, ch. 5). In February 1911, Ivanov spoke at a meeting of the RPS in Moscow, in the auditorium of Shanyavsky University, in the report "On the Significance of Vl. Solovyov in the destiny of our religious consciousness". Among the listeners was A. F. Losev, a student of Moscow University. In March, F. Stepun, a long-time guest of the "Tower", discussed Hellenism and theurgic art with Ivanov. In the second half of 1911, the activities of the RPS and the Ivanov Section began to arouse the suspicion of the authorities, and according to the available data, only three lectures were read in the 1911-1912 season, including one by Andrei Bely. At first, at least two speeches by Vyacheslav Ivanov were expected, but nothing came of them. On May 19, 1912, Vyacheslav Ivanov and his family went abroad, and that was the end of the "Tower" and the Ivanov section of the Religious-Philosophical Society.

When he visited St. Petersburg in January 1914, Ivanov, despite his extremely busy schedule, went to the PRS on the very day of his arrival. On January 26, the debate on the expulsion of V. V. Rozanov from the Society was held, and Ivanov was the fifteenth speaker, closing the session. He took the opportunity to summarize much of what had been said before and emphasized the inadmissibility of ideological measures in the evaluation of the writer's work. Thus, Rozanov's question was translated into the political level and the context of the future, not only of the society, but of the whole country. Ivanov prophesied the greatest danger, like the 1905 revolution, and argued that Rozanov's voice would be very important in the new turmoil. On the other hand, the parties that called themselves "democratic" seemed to be less tolerant than the tsarist government.

=== Turn to Orthodoxy. Ivanov's Christianity ===
The Moscow period was marked by Ivanov's close cooperation with the Religious and Philosophical Society in Memory of Vladimir Solovyov and the publishing house "Put". He began to "explore the earth" instead of utopian dreams of choir communities and proclaimed the social ideal of the churching, according to R. Byord. This immediately led to a clash with Berdyaev, as Ivanov rejected the division of Orthodoxy into "eternal" and "historical" churches and argued for a "fluid sobornost". In a message of January 30, 1915, Berdyaev accused him of betraying the precepts of libertinism and the memory of L. D. Zinovieva-Annibal, and even of "renouncing Dionysus"-not for the first or last time. According to R. Byord, Ivanov's ideal of self-sacrifice in the name of the Infinite did not change at all, only that Rome the First was temporarily replaced by Rome the Second, i.e. Tsargrad. For some time Ivanov. was carried away by the ideal of hagiocracy, under which he understood the universal Third Rome as a living tradition leading to eternity. For him, the fate of the Church depended directly on the fate of Russia-Rome:

If in the St. Petersburg period Ivanov risked relegating religion to the level of art, in the Moscow period he sinned rather the opposite. But even in the mixing of sacraments and artistic actions, the idea of continuity as the basis of culture and Christian tradition foreshadowed positive possibilities for the development of his worldview.

In general, Ivanov's own teaching often took him beyond the boundaries of Orthodoxy and Christianity in general. Vyacheslav Ivanovich, calling to ascend into the reality of the symbol and symbolism, did not demand from man the revelation of himself, the purification from sins. According to N. Popov, "without forcing a person - the main participant in the "real", symbolism destroys the reality of the expected real and makes it a mere abstraction". In the Roman years Ivanov himself characterized his views as "pagan humanism" and "the heresy of the dark kings", but, according to R. Bird, many of his ideas are of considerable interest to Orthodox theology. At the same time, Ivanov avoided making judgments about the latter reality, probably believing that his task was to promote the New Epiphany through word and image. From 1909 he repeatedly testified to his personal confession of Christian faith. On November 24, 1909, in a speech to the Theosophical Society, he firmly rejected Theosophy. This did not prevent him from being openly interested in Rosicrucianism or Gnosticism, both then and later, which led to accusations of corrupting influence on the Church. This, however, expressed the general characteristics of Ivanov's thinking: his tendency to operate with myths as the most authoritative testimony to the underlying motivations of man. Aesthetics and narrative integrity came to the fore. Thus, Ivanov counted Nietzsche among the legion of Christian podvizhnikies (or ascetic movement). Fully aware of the factual inaccuracy of this statement, he was convinced of its inner "truth" and left it to his readers to judge faith by "works" — poetry and speculation.

Ivanov proclaimed apophatic theology and shied away from direct naming, which is strongly evident in his poetry of ecstatic dithyrambs to an indescribable "Person" or nameless "Name. In the poem "The Road to Emmaus," Ivanov compared his blindness to ultimate reality to the apostles' failure to recognize Christ after his resurrection. Accordingly, during his Moscow years, in collaboration with Orthodox thinkers, he focused more on the history of Christian Russia than on the contemporary debates about imiaslavie or sophiology. While clearly indicating his acceptance of Solovyov's doctrine, he avoided the name "Sophia". In the disputes over name-slavism, he clearly sympathized with the Caucasian hermits engaged in "intelligent work", and these images were reflected in his poetry of the 1910s. However, in the poems dedicated to icons and other objects of religion, Vyacheslav Ivanovich was more interested in the narrative element. This was so noticeable that S. Frank even spoke of Ivanov's "iconoclasm": even in moments of the most consistent Orthodox self-identification, he saw religion as a text.

The medievalist E. Ananyin, who communicated with Ivanov in Italy, left the following judgment about his religiosity:

His religion was something luminous, without a shadow of cruelty, and he called his creed, following some Renaissance thinkers, "docta pietas," which harmoniously combined religious intuition with ancient philosophy. Plato, he thought, had preceded Christ. This idea was perhaps inspired by his teacher Vladimir Solovyov, whom he held in high esteem.

=== "Correspondence from two corners" ===
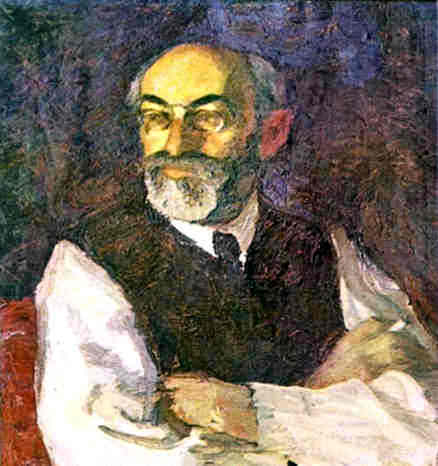
Leonid Pasternak. Portrait of Mikhail Gershenzon. 1917

In the spring of 1920 Ivanov found himself in the same room with M. Gershenzon in a state sanatorium in Moscow. Together with them was V. Khodasevich, who described their everyday life: the beds of the two thinkers were in different corners of the room, diagonally opposite each other. Ivanov was visited in this environment by the then young V. N. Voloshinov and M. M. Bakhtin. According to O. Shor, Ivanov once said to his neighbor: "We talk too much and interfere with each other's studies; let's exchange letters." The suggestion was accepted, then the concept and the title appeared: "Correspondence from two corners".

According to R. Byord, the correspondence with Gershenzon expressed the ambiguity of Ivanov's philosophical position, which preached both the continuity of culture and its ultimate origin and purpose. In his daily life, this was manifested in his simultaneous support for the Soviet power and in his persistent attempts to escape from it. Moreover, in the fifth message of the correspondence, Vyach Ivanov directly connects Gershenzon's idea of cultural fatigue with the common desire of both correspondents to leave Russia. It is not by chance that G. Florovsky connected this theme with Ivanov's metaphysical conversion and his assertion of the independence of the personal consciousness from the cultural environment. The independence of consciousness is based on faith in God, and it grants independence from revolutionary reality: "To live in God is no longer to live entirely in relative human culture, but to grow out of it, out of the will". Ivanov's refusal to go abroad, which he had already promised, may explain the end of this "correspondence" with the question "Shall we not return to our corners? The intensification of Ivanov's calls for a deeper involvement into tradition is connected with his rejection of his long-held idea of an immediate transition to the realm of beauty. In its place comes a reflection on a return to the origins of being. It is noteworthy that despite the relative brevity of the time frame of "The Correspondence," its characters radically change their positions from the beginning to the end. Ivanov called the Russian intelligentsia "runners" and declared that he had an aversion to flight as the only means of solving all difficulties. Gershenzon had to admit that inner freedom in culture was possible, while Ivanov, influenced by his friend's assertions, abandoned the thesis of his transcendence from culture and was able to realize (involuntarily) that he was deeply rooted in it. Beginning with the idea of freedom from culture, Ivanov ended with the assertion of freedom through culture.

"Correspondence from Two Corners", which miraculously appeared in the political and intellectual situation of Moscow in 1920, and was unexpectedly published and perceived by contemporaries as a work of a fundamentally new genre. It was published in 1921 by the "Alkonost" publishing house, which was considered "free", with an edition of 2000 copies. The second edition in Russian was published in Berlin in 1922. Thanks to a number of translations into European languages, the book became immediately popular. The Italian translation included a preface written by Ivanov's companion Olga Schor. Erich Hollerbach realized "Correspondence from Two Worlds" in the 1920s, and A. F. Losev, freed from the Belomorstroi camp. F. Losev wrote "Correspondence in a Room". The relevance of "Correspondence" was not erased even by the Second World War, and in 1955 G. V. Adamovich suggested to G. V. Ivanov to create a "Correspondence from Two Corners" about poetry, but the idea was never realized.

=== Joining the Catholic Church ===
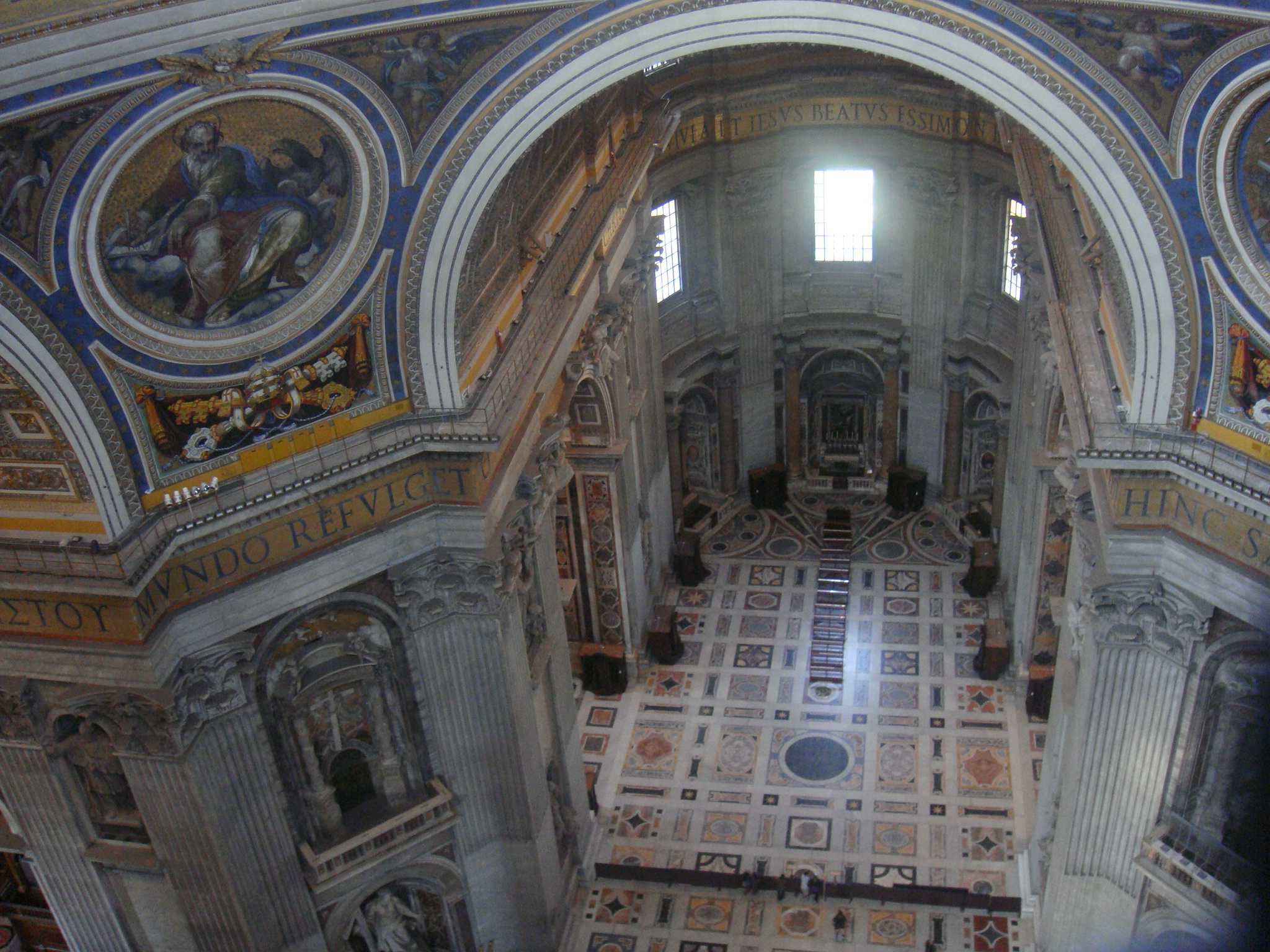
The right transept of St. Peter's Basilica in Rome, where the altar of St. Vyacheslav is located

According to R. Byord, Ivanov's transition to the Roman Catholic Church should be seen in the context of his personal historiosophy and the indirect nature of his theological thinking. For the first time he clearly showed sympathy for Catholicism in the years after the death of L. D. Zinovieva-Annibal. According to the testimony of the secret exarch of the Uniate Church, Leonid Fedorov, dated 1912, Ivanov's sympathies for Catholicism were then based on his own aesthetic and mystical fantasies. In a letter to Charles du Bos in 1930, Vyach Ivanov conceptualized his way to spiritual Rome in a completely different way. First of all, he cited the influence of Vl. S. Solovyov, and then - the historical catastrophe of 1917 and the impotence of the Orthodox Church in the face of the cataclysm. Conversion to Catholicism clearly satisfied Ivanov's long-held dreams of theocracy, which he defined as "theandria" (God-humanity). Finally, Ivanov wrote rather irritably about emigrants who identified confessional forms with the idea of homeland. In other words, Vyacheslav Ivanov conceptualized his accession as an ideological act, a conscious choice of universalism over particularism.

On March 14, 1926, Vyacheslav Ivanov sent a petition to the Congregation of Eastern Churches to unite with the Catholic Church, but in a separate paragraph he wrote permission to unite according to the formula of V. Solovyov, "because he had once experienced the joy of personal spiritual guidance" on his part. As in the case of Vladimir Sergeyevich, the pronunciation of the formula meant joining, not transition or renunciation from the Orthodox Church. Moreover, Ivanov insisted that joining meant confessing that his Church remained true, that the Eastern tradition of saints and the Russian saints were valid. On the contrary, he declared the Most Holy Synod, which was subordinate to the state, to be non-canonical. This position in the 1920s was quite exceptional, and only in the second half of the 20th century it became clear that it was ahead of the direction of communion between the Russian Orthodox and Roman Churches. The Congregation for the Eastern Churches forwarded Ivanov's request to the Congregation for the Dicastery for the Doctrine of the Faith, which on March 17 approved the transition "according to an unusual formula" (Ivanov translated Solovyov's French text into Italian) and informed the Congregation for the Eastern Churches on March 20. Among the prelates of St. Peter's Basilica, however, the formula caused confusion. The act of conversion itself took place on March 17 of the Julian calendar, the feast of St. Vyacheslav, at his altar in the transept of St. Peter's Basilica in the Vatican, in the presence of a Russian Catholic priest, Father Vladimir Abrikosov. Vyacheslav Ivanov recited the creed along with Solovyov's formula. However, even after the transition, Ivanov did not maintain relations with Russian Catholics or Uniates for another decade. It was not until he moved to the Pontifical Oriental Institute in 1936 that Ivanov experienced some influence from neo-scholasticism. The well-known influence of Catholicism is noticeable in the "Roman Diary of 1944," but in general it did not lead to any noticeable changes in the ideological and artistic structure of Ivanov's work. Moreover, judging from his correspondence with S. Frank in 1947, in the last years of his life Ivanov still argued about the unity of "Greek" and "Latin" and pushed subjectivism in the ritual understanding of religion to the limit.

=== Ivanov and European intellectuals ===
Ivanov was closely united to European intellectuals during his years in Pavia. He came into contact with members of the Lombard circle, especially the indologist Luigi Suali, the biblical scholar Nashimbene, who became rector of the Collegio Borromeo in the 1930s, the political scientist Beonio-Brocchieri, and others. Ivanov was probably trying to recreate the spiritual atmosphere of his "Tower" and intellectual "symposia," when the meetings focused primarily on the personality of the interlocutor and his interests. In April 1931, Benedetto Croce came to the Collegio. His meeting with Ivanov turned into a dramatic and violent argument about the roots of irreconcilable doctrines: Christianity and absolute idealism, transcendentalism and immanentism. Alessandro Pellegrini was present and tried to continue Ivanov's "Correspondence from Two Corners" on his own level. Pellegrini, on the other hand, arranged for a special issue of the Milanese journal Il Convegno in early 1934, devoted entirely to Ivanov. Articles on Ivanov's work were written by Gabriel Marcel, Ernst Robert Curtius, Thaddeus Zelinsky, Fyodor Stepun; poetic works translated into Italian, including the author's own translations, were there. Marcel also wrote the preface for the French edition of "Correspondence from two corners". Ivanov did not break his intellectual ties with Germany. In fact, in 1926, Martin Buber published a German translation of the "Correspondence from two corners" in his journal Die Kreatur. In 1931, Buber visited Ivanov in Pavia. In 1932, based on articles from the collections "Borozdy i mezhi" and "Native and Universal", extensively revised by Ivanov, a major work on Dostoevsky was published in Tübingen. Moreover, at the turn of 1927-1928, Martin Bodmer and Herbert Steiner, with whom the poet was friends, visited him in Pavia, published in their journal Corona (the first article in German was devoted to Virgil's historiosophy), and later visited Switzerland. Ivanov also corresponded intensively with the French critic Charles du Bos, although they met in person only once.

Nevertheless, one should be cautious about Ivanov's entry into the European intellectual context. His social circle was wide, and his publications were not sporadic. However, while Ivanov gained like-minded people and an audience, he carefully avoided belonging to any circles and groups, especially those of Russian emigrants. His fame was not widespread even in Italy: he had difficulty finding publishers and published in small-circulation periodicals. The article on Ivanov in Bompiani's dictionary (Dizionario Bompiani dei filosofi contemporanei, 1990) mentions only three works: The Homeric Epic, The Crisis of Humanism, and Dostoevsky, published in German; no mention is made of philosophical works written in Italian. In this respect, according to A. Kondurina, Ivanov shared the fate of other Russian thinkers who were not limited by language, specific problems or national mentality, but who were never recognized in the West.

=== Ivanov's Historiosophy in Correspondence with E. Schor ===
Vyacheslav Ivanov had a particularly close relationship with the Schor family, as Olga Alexandrovna Schor was David Schor's niece and a cousin of Evsei Davidovich Schor (Yusha in correspondence). It was Evsei who made considerable efforts in the 1930s to promote and make sense of Ivanov's work in Europe. He cooperated with the publishing house "Mohr" in Tübingen and "Vita Nova" in Lucerne, where he promoted the works of Berdyaev and Shestov, translated G. Speth, and corresponded with F. Stepun. The correspondence between him and Ivanov began already in the Pavia years. It was in this correspondence that Ivanov expressed a number of his extremely deep and long matured ideas, which had previously been reflected in the "Correspondence from Two Corners" and further realized in the "Tale of Svetomir". In particular, in a message dated October 26, 1927, Ivanov reported:

For me, culture is a Greco-Roman plant. There are two branches: the European East and the European West. The original (folk) Russian culture is the genuine, ancient, Byzantine culture, though in a state of relative stagnation. Western European culture is unified and alive in all tribes, once Romanized. The Germanic tribes, once not Romanized, are no less long in history, though until now in opposition to it within its limits. The Russian purpose is not to protect "plantations" (by the way, Russia itself was Europeanized when it wanted to be, no one "Europeanized" it like India or China), but to abolish the critical modus of modern Jewish culture, to replace it with an organic one, which is possible for it alone, because it alone has preserved the deposits of the old organic culture. Incidentally, the Bolsheviks also want an organic culture.

D. Segal, commenting on this fragment, drew attention to two aspects: neither for Shor nor for Ivanov there is an Anglo-American world, and Vyacheslav Ivanovich's remark, despite its brevity, was partly a prediction of the direction of the culture of developed Stalinism. Also in the correspondence of Ivanov and O. Shor with E. Shor, the motive of contrast between Germany and the rest of Europe was strong, long before the proclamation of Nazi Germany. In a letter of August 20, 1933, unprecedented in its frankness and expressiveness, Ivanov retrospectively tried to revise all his early views and declared them "insincere". Vyacheslav Ivanovich tried to justify that even before the "Tower" and in its early period he had allegedly already fully realized the Christian-church essence of his worldview. Segal noted that "the difficulty in accurately describing this worldview ... lies in the peculiar essential character of Ivanov's worldview, which did not want to see itself radically changed, but sought to present the matter as if everything in it had been there from the beginning". Moreover, even in the early 1930s, Ivanov, positioning himself as a practicing Catholic, tried to pass off his own (for him, actual) theology as the viewpoint of the Church. In the same letter Vyach Ivanov, in fact, stated that the triumph of Nazism in Germany violently destroyed all the plans of spiritual search of the Russian emigrants and meant further marginalization of Ivanov himself.

== Ivanov as a researcher of Dionysianism ==
Ivanov approached the book "Dionysus and Pradionysianism" practically all his life: twice in Russian and once in German language. Special research on this work was conducted by Michael Wachtel as part of a project to publish a German version of Ivanov's monograph in 2012. The formation of Ivanov's views on ancient Dionysianism was equally influenced by academic studies in Germany, work in Athens in 1901-1902, translations of Aeschylus, and orgiastic manifestations in Soviet Russia and Shiite Azerbaijan. By "Dionysianism" Ivanov meant the passionate cult of the eastern Mediterranean. He first turned to this problem as a philologist in Germany, when he himself had to define himself in the discussion about Nietzsche von Wilamowitz-Möllendorf and Rohde, then it became a constant source of his poetic work in different dimensions, with the invariability of the ideas about Dionysianism compensated by the multiplicity and variability of the addressees.

Philip Westbrook discovered, first, that Ivanov's scientific studies were not really such, for they merely formalized his personal religious and philosophical quest. Second, the sources of his work on Dionysianism and tragedy - as the supreme manifestation of Dionysianism — were the following:

1. Ancient Greek writers and thinkers from Euripides to Plato and from Aristotle to Proclus, who saw in the god Dionysus the mythical prototype of the philosophical doctrine of the binary;
2. German philosophical philologists, especially Friedrich Nietzsche and Erwin Rohde, for whom antiquity was the key to a new esotericism, including social; (Note: Ivanov was sensitive to personal Nietzscheanism, which allowed him to find common ground with, for example, M. Gorky)
3. Russian thinkers from the early Slavophiles through Vladimir Solovyov to younger contemporaries of Ivanov himself. Such was, for example, Alexei Losev, who called Vyach. iv. a mentor and role model. According to Westbrook, even Sergei Averintsev partially stylized his speech and social behavior as Ivanov's.

Meanwhile, Ivanov's deep immersion in the elements of literature and his own views prevented him from realizing himself during the discussions of the 1920s and 1930s around Walter Otto's and Karl Kerenyi's books on ancient religion. Ivanov could never accept the profound heterogeneity of Dionysianism and the susceptibility of local cults to foreign cultural influences. Ivanov was "fatally unprepared" to accept a historical approach to the religious cults of the Eastern Mediterranean, he wrote in a review of Kerenyi's book on Hellenistic syncretism (1928), and failed to see the development of his own ideas. Vyacheslav Ivanovich's protest was provoked by the assertion of the dominance of Eastern cults in Hellenistic religious syncretism. On the contrary, he tried to prove that the Hellenic religion of the suffering God was an indigenous Greek phenomenon and even a guarantee of the triumph of this doctrine, without noticing that in the academic mainstream the question of the "independent" or "borrowed" character of the cult has long since been replaced by problems of content and interpretation. Ivanov's position here was strictly idealistic: "to establish, describe and interpret in all its uniqueness a certain creative act of the Hellenic spirit"; esotericism turned out to be more important for him than the socio-cultural dimension of orgiastic religions. According to G. Huseynov, Ivanov could not fit into the German academic context. If Ivanov appeared before his young colleagues as a "priest of Dionysus" in the times of the "Tower" vigils, there was nothing of the kind in his environment in Rome. Accordingly, in the Roman period, the concept of Dionysianism in Vyacheslav Ivanovich turned into an instrument of search for spiritual community "among his own", which was openly confessional and ideological in nature (von Vilamomitz was a Protestant). For Ivanov, Christianity appears as a part of the great ancient tradition, as a part of the last, most important, final, and perhaps not yet fully realized, not yet outlived, and therefore giving hope and promising revival.

== Ivanov as a critic and translator ==
=== Dostoevsky's science and Ivanov ===
The University of St. Petersburg (then Petrograd) in the 1910s played an important role in the philosophical and methodological self-understanding of literary studies. The study of Dostoevsky's legacy was a private manifestation of the general historical and literary process in this context. On the other hand, during the discussions in the RPS, Dostoevsky's legacy was consistently used as an element of the language of self-description of the Russian religious-philosophical culture of the early twentieth century. In the 1910s, the methodological turn in the study of Dostoevsky was directed along the path from psychologism and discrete analysis of characters and their ideologies to the principle of form — a consistently teleological consideration of the artistic work as a whole. The latter is directly connected with the personality and activity of Vyacheslav Ivanov. In 1911, for the first time, he openly expressed his position in the journal "Russian Mind", where his famous work "Dostoyevsky and the Novel-Tragedy" was printed. He continued to develop his own ideas or creatively reinterpreted ideas of I. Annensky, A. Volynsky, D. Merezhkovsky in articles and monographs: "Excursus: The Main Myth in the novel "Demons" (1914), "Living Tradition" (1915), "Two Harmonies of the Russian Soul" (1916), "Face and Faces of Russia. Towards a Study of Dostoyevsky's Ideology" (1917).

In these texts, Ivanov placed Dostoevsky's legacy in the broadest possible historical and cultural context, from antiquity to the new European era. At the same time, Ivanov emphasized Dostoevsky's national-Russian character as an author linked to Orthodox traditions. In the world of Fyodor Mikhailovich's novels he found true dialogism (the principle of "you are") and sobornost ("polyphonic chorus", the idea of which later influenced the views of M. M. Bakhtin). In fact, Ivanov first mentioned polyphony as an analog of choral sobornost in his 1908 article "Two Elements in Modern Symbolism". He characterized Dostoevsky's creative method as "mystical realism" (or "realistic symbolism"), relying on its self-definition - "realism in the highest sense".

Ivanov devoted a special place in his work "Dostoevsky and the novel-tragedy" to the study of the genre uniqueness of Fyodor Mikhailovich's novels. Ivanov understood the development of genre forms as a path from the epic to the drama, and so in the "great five books" he saw his own dream of "overcoming individualism" and the last step towards the "cathedral" unity of the "people's spirit" in the "tsarina-tragedy", in his opinion the highest form of human creativity. Nevertheless, according to O. A. Bogdanova, many of Ivanov's insights were never developed by him. First of all, it is the idea of the internal connection of all of Dostoyevsky's post-prison works, the constitutive role of the idea in the composition of his novels ("novel theorem"), the strategy of mystical "penetration" into the essence of phenomena as opposed to their rational "cognition", etc. No less fruitful were the ideas about the musical substratum of Dostoevsky's novels; these considerations went back to the ideas of F. Nietzsche. Naturally, Ivanov interpreted Dostoyevsky as an ecstatic artist realizing the "spirit of Dionysus", whose outer development was determined by a catastrophic inner experience.

For a number of external and internal reasons, Ivanov never returned to many of his stated themes, even in emigration. However, the declared "principle of form" in relation to the "principle of worldview" became the starting point and beacon for all subsequent studies. It united M. Bakhtin, V. Komarovich, B. Engelhardt, Y. Tynyanov, B. Eichenbaum, L. Grossman, and M. P. Alekseev. O. Bogdanova gave examples of the concrete influence of Ivanov's ideas on Bakhtin. First of all, it is the idea of subject-subject relations between personalities in Dostoevsky's novels, which became the basis of Bakhtin's dialogism. Secondly, it is the thesis that Dostoevsky's novels do not contain "things of the world" but exclusively "people — human personalities", which precedes Bakhtin's assertion of the dominant role of self-consciousness in the construction of the hero's image. While Vyacheslav Ivanov argued that Dostoyevsky's novel was the highest stage in the development of the genre, Bakhtin's apology of the novel far surpasses Ivanov's (Vyacheslav Ivanovich recognized tragedy as the highest literary form). Bakhtin, following Ivanov, saw Dostoevsky's work in the broadest cultural context, going back centuries to antiquity.

=== Ivanov and Aeschylus ===
Ivanov's intention to translate the "Oresteia" was first mentioned in a letter from V. E. Meyerhold dated July 25, 1908. However, the plans did not go further, especially since the management of the Alexandrinsky Theatre bought "Antigone" and "Oedipus Rex" from Merezhkovsky. The actual commission came in 1911 from the Sabashnikov Publishers, when the owner, convinced of the educational value of the Greek and Roman classics for Russian people, launched a series of "Monuments of the World's Letters":

No one in Russia has read the classics in the original, and no one reads them, except professional philologists. There are no translations. They simply do not know the classics. The fact that they will stop torturing high school students with grammatical exercises in ancient languages will only benefit our cause. There will be no prejudice against the classics.

The chief consultant for Sabashnikov's edition was M. O. Gershenzon, who immediately referred the client to F. F. Zelinsky and Ivanov. F. Zelinsky and Ivanov. "Aeschylus" was immediately assigned to Vyacheslav Ivanovich. On April 6, 1911, he received the text of the contract, under which he was obliged to complete all the plays by May 1, 1913, on the basis of a fee of 50 kopecks. for each translated verse of the Greek text for an unlimited number of editions, but the text of the commentary or prose periphrasis, if the publisher considers it useful, will not be paid. Ivanov was not satisfied with the terms of the contract, and Gershenzon acted as an intermediary between him and Sabashnikov, but it is never known whether work had begun by January 1912. Talking to M. Altman in Baku, Ivanov spoke unfavorably of Zelinsky's translations of "Sophocles", and was dissatisfied both with their literary merits and with the fact that the text was "drowned" in commentary. Ivanov believed that every language should have canonical translations, definitive and irreplaceable, such as Zhukovsky's "Odyssey". Ivanov himself mentioned that he had tried to translate the "Iliad", but it turned out to be "in a special, Old Russian way and completely different from Gnedich's translation".

Ivanov was distracted by V. O. Nilender's project to publish an anthology of Greek texts in Russian translation on his return to Moscow from Rome. Although the texts formed the basis of the 1939 textbook Greek Literature in Selected Translations, the project was never completed due to Ivanov's slowness. Finally, in 1914, Sabashnikov's publishing house published Alcaeus and Sappho in Ivanov's translation. As early as 1913, Sabashnikov personally visited Ivanov in Rome, and as a result they reached a new agreement: in addition to Aeschylus, Vyacheslav Ivanovich undertook to translate Dante's text "La Vita Nuova". Vyacheslav Ivanovich received a fixed advance of 200 rubles per month for the entire period of translation work. However, as a result of further delays, in 1914 Sabashnikov was forced to terminate the contract and stop the advance. As a result, despite the repeated claim in the literature that Ivanov translated all of Aeschylus, this was far from the truth. Of the seven tragedies of Aeschylus, Ivanov translated 323 out of 1074 verses in "The Suppliants"; in the tragedy "Seven Against Thebes" — 773 out of 1078 verses in the editions of the time. The translation of the tragedy "Prometheus Bound" was never started. Only "Agamemnon" and "Oresteia" were finished in draft, but the epic with them dragged on until the 1920s. One of the reasons for Ivanov's stays in Italy in 1920 and 1924 was the completion of the Aeschylus translations.

=== Ivanov as a translator of Renaissance poets ===
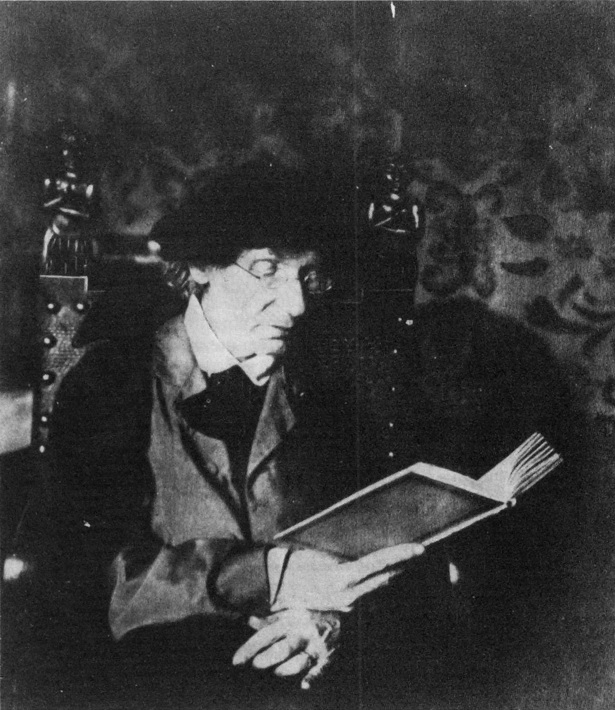
Vyacheslav Ivanov, c. 1920, working on translations of Dante

Translation was an important part of the Symbolists' practical program for the overcoming of the isolation of Russian literary culture. In the light of this position, Vyach. Ivanov with his Italian interests tried to realize three projects - translations of selected sonnets of Petrarch's "Il Canzoniere", the whole poetic corpus of Michelangelo and the "Divine Comedy". Only the Petrarchan translations -33 sonnets out of 317: 22 "on the life of Laura" and 11 "on the death of Laura"- took on any form. The choice of themes was carefully considered by the translator, who tried to reproduce in Russian the complex "polyhedral" architecture of the original. A book of translations from Petrarch was published in 1915, and on one of the gift copies (to Y. N. Verkhovsky) Ivanov wrote an occasional poem in archaic Italian, imitating Petrarch's style. It is his only Italian poem.

Vyacheslav Ivanov became interested in translating The "Divine Comedy" in 1920, a difficult year for him. According to the contract concluded with the publishing house "Brockhaus and Ephron", the "Comedy" was to be translated twice: first, as a poetic arrangement, and second, as an accurate prose translation with scientific commentary. An example of this kind of poetic-hermeneutic work survives in the 1925 translation of one of Michelangelo's sonnets. The interpretive prose translation was followed by a detailed commentary showing how the Renaissance poet refracted ancient ideas. This was followed by an equilinear verse transposition: Ivanov insisted that only a transposition in verse that reproduces the ideas, images, and symbols of the original in the solid form of another poetic language can be made. Ivanov translated 8 sonnets by Michelangelo in the mid-1920s, but then abandoned this work as well, convinced that his name was becoming "odious" to Moscow publishers.

The history of the translation of the "Divine Comedy" was complicated. P. Davidson quoted the information about Brusov's participation in the project from his correspondence with Vengerov dated July 5, 1920. At the same time, under a contract with the same publishing house, V. Y. Brusov undertook to translate Goethe's Faust. In fact, Brusov's attempts to print his own translation of "Inferno" were made in 1913, 1915 and 1917. The press also reported about a certain joint project of Brusov and Ivanov for the Dante anniversary, which was to take place in September 1921. However, Vengerov died in September 1920, and the publishing projects of Brokgauz and Efron were taken over by Gorky's "World Literature". Ettore Lo Gatto, who communicated with Ivanov in Italy, claimed that the poet was translating "Purgatory". Ivanov returned to his translation of the "Divine Comedy" several times. In Baku he showed some finished parts to M. Altman and V. Manuilov, and in Rome in 1928 he read some fragments to I. Golenishchev-Kutuzov. As early as 1929, M. Gorky tried to "break through" the publication of Ivanov's translation of "Hell", probably not even begun at that time, but the political situation did not allow it.

К. I. Chukovsky in his diary (entry of February 13, 1923) recorded a meeting of "World Literature", where it was planned to include in the publishing plans Boccaccio, Petronius Arbiter, etc., including "The Divine Comedy". In the end, Brusov's translation of "Faust" was published in 1928 in the new publishing house "Academia", in whose publishing plan the "Comedy" was included in 1930. However, in 1939, after all the reorganizations, the translation was entrusted by Goslitizdat to M. Lozinsky, who completed it in 1945. Pamela Davidson pointed out the symbolic chain of "inheritance": Lozinsky translated from an edition that once belonged to Vyach Ivanov. In 1892, he gave this volume to I. M. Greves, who in turn gave it to Lozinsky.

=== Ettore Lo Gatto and Pushkin ===
Between 1926 and 1937, Ivanov was in close contact, both personally and by correspondence, with the founder of Italian Slavic studies, Ettore Lo Gatto (whom he called "Hector Dominikovich" in his correspondence). They met for the first time on the recommendation of F. Zelinsky soon after the poet's arrival in Rome. Lo Gatto's main project was the translation into Italian of "Eugene Onegin", which he had published in prose in the 1920s, and then he set about creating a poetic equivalent, in which he was constantly consulted by Ivanov. Of the 16 letters by Lo Gatto identified in Ivanov's archive, 10 were devoted to the problems of translation. At the same time, in 1937 the translator experienced a serious crisis, and Ivanov, who witnessed all the vicissitudes, was one of the first to formulate the thesis: "both the metal and the coinage of Pushkin's verse are irreproducible in other languages", although he praised Lo Gatto's translation as highly as possible. An attempt to organize large Pushkin celebrations in Rome in 1937 also failed, but Lo Gatto instead published a large volume of studies and essays on Pushkin, for which Ivanov wrote an article in Italian, "Aspects of Beauty and Goodness in Pushkin's Poetry".

== Ivanov's later critical and literary work ==
Although Vyacheslav Ivanov's critical articles and monographs published during his years in Italy were based on texts he had already published, they show a great development of thought. For example, the article "Anima", published in 1935 in Bodmer's journal Corona, was a revision of the 1907 article "You are". The original German translation was made by E. Schor, who later used it in his "Experience of Reconstructing Ivanov's Worldview". However, Ivanov was dissatisfied and tried to make his text, written in the heyday of symbolism, understandable to the intelligent European reader. As a result, "Anima" was transformed from a religious-philosophical text into an artistic work in the form of a myth, which requires the activation of the reader's cultural memory. This text can be read both as a parable about the soul's path to the divine beloved and as a psychoanalytic study in a way of C. Jung. Ivanov's discussions with E. Curtius were connected with the problematics of "Anima", which, according to modern researchers, are based on the commonality of cultural codes or topics. It was Curtius who introduced the concept of topos into literary studies, borrowing it from Aristotle's rhetoric: these are "ready-made formulas" of rhetorical and non-rhetorical origin used in the process of spiritual communication and are evidence of the change or preservation of consciousness or mentality. Ivanov used in "Anima" metaphysical vocabulary characteristic of the most important world religions and philosophical works. С. Frank made a translation of the text back into Russian, but it was published only by O. Schor in 1965, then placed in the third volume of Ivanov's collected works both in the German original and in translation.

Similarly, the book about Dostoyevsky ("Dostoyevsky: Tragedy - Myth - Mysticism") was the result of Vyacheslav Ivanov's discussions with J. Maritain, Ch. du Bos, M. Buber, G. Marcel, and his own articles of 1914-1918 on the novel-tragedy. The second part of Dostoevsky, devoted to the myth in the structure of the writer's consciousness and creativity, was completely original and was an attempt to develop an archetypal method. Ivanov distinguished three interrelated aspects of studying the essence of Dostoevsky's work: tragedy ("Tragodumena"), the myth of "Mother Earth" superimposed on the Gnostic myth of the "Soul of the World" ("Mythologumena"), and the writer's religious prophecies ("Theologumena"). Dostoyevsky, according to Vyacheslav Ivanov, tries to realize the metaphysical problems of human existence, and in this respect his work is based on universal archetypal themes. Therefore, the action of his novels-tragedies takes place in the metaphysical sphere "between God and man" and is based "on Augustine's opposition between love of God and love of self, to the point of hatred of God". Ivanov believes that Dostoevsky's novels are based on the principle of ascending to archetypes (primordial images), forming a mythological core. According to Ivanov, Dostoyevsky's novels, tragic in their inner antinomianism, are based on the principle of ascent to archetypes (primordial images), forming a mythological core. Moreover, Dostoyevsky created his own myth of the antinomian nature of the human soul, connected with the early Christian archetype of the heavenly man, the true face (the icon as a sign of the "primordial essence") and the archetype of the opposing and fighting with a God man (Lucifer) as one of the faces of the demonic "legion".

Still in his Pavian years, Ivanov began his last work: "The Tale of Tsarevich Svetomir", on which he worked almost continuously from 1928 to 1949, literally until his death. It was a complex text written in poetic prose (verse) in a form stylized as a medieval legend or hagiography. At the same time, the whole genre variety appears in the text as elements with a coded meaning that requires hermeneutic interpretation. The original style is reminiscent of the Old Russian "weaving of words", while the language is stylized under folklore, and the fifth song is written entirely in bookish Church Slavonic; the graphic verse is close to biblical, with the numbering of verses. The space in which the characters of the "Tale" act can be called a mystery.

"The Tale of Tsarevich Svetomir" embodied the idea of Christian revival, which could be realized on the basis of humanism and religion; this was one of Ivanov's main thoughts in exile. He produced the last parts, the fourth and fifth, in parallel with his commentary on the books of the New Testament, commissioned by the Vatican. This was part of a project to expand the presence of the Catholic Church in Eastern Europe, which could not but return Ivanov to historiosophical reflections on the fate of Russia in the world. The most important semantic layer of the narrative is the unbroken thousand-year tradition of Russian literature, from the "Primary Chronicles" and "The Tale of Igor's Campaign" to A. С. Pushkin and F. M. Dostoevsky to the Symbolists and Futurists (V. Khlebnikov). For Ivanov the whole Russian culture appeared as something integral and complete, and in the period when he was actively writing the "Tale", Holy Russia has gone to "the rest of the Lord", and those who remain on earth could only hope for its coming resurrection.

== History of Vyacheslav Ivanov's Archive ==
In the 1950s, G. Ivask first became interested in the fate of Ivanov's archival manuscripts as part of the broader issue of the archival heritage of leading Russian writers in exile. When he consulted O. Shor, she was the first to describe Ivanov's manuscript materials as a unified whole, despite their fragmentation and belonging to different countries. On his departure from Moscow in 1924, Ivanov left 14 boxes of his library and archives in the care of A. N. Chebotarevskaya. N. Chebotarevskaya, sister-in-law of F. Sologub. Due to the impossibility of storing them in the conditions of communal living, the process of transferring the archive to the Bakhrushinsky Museum was initiated. In the end, most of the abandoned materials ended up in the Manuscripts Department of Lenin's Library, where they formed a large collection ¹109 (1256 items for the period 1880-1921). Smaller collections were also deposited in the Russian State Archive of Literature (f. 225) and the Gorky Institute of World Literature (f. 55). Since some of Ivanov's materials reached Leningrad when the Sologub archive was transferred to the National Library of Russia (f. 304) and the Pushkin House (f. 607), Ivanov's funds were created. All these materials are described and available to researchers.

Vyacheslav Ivanovich took with him to Rome only what seemed essential for the new work: manuscripts and drafts of poems, an unfinished translation of Aeschylus' tragedies, the poem "Man", some diary notebooks and pages, copies of first editions of his works, and some books, including works by Florensky and Ern. Some manuscripts of L. D. Zinovieva-Annibal were also taken. Since the Ivanovs did not have a permanent home until 1935, the books and manuscripts were stored in a warehouse in Rome. Gradually, a new Italian archive, mostly family and business correspondence, was also accumulated. After Vyacheslav Ivanov's death, his son and daughter decided to keep the archive in Rome. It was thought to be the place where posthumous communication with their father would continue (literally, given their beliefs). The papers, paintings and photographs were kept in an apartment in Via Leon Battista Alberti, where Vyacheslav Ivanov spent the last 10 years of his life. The main mediator in the use of the archive materials was O. Shor, who actively assisted F. Stepun in his research for his last book on Russian symbolism. Until her death in 1978, O. Shor provided materials to many other researchers (R. Gul, B. Filippov, V. Markov) and corresponded with A. Rannit, curator of the Slavic Library at Yale University. It was A. Rannit who organized an exhibition for Vyach in 1966. Ivanov's 100th anniversary. Since the 1960s, correspondence with the USSR was resumed, especially with M. Altman and V. Manuilov, members of the Gershenzon and Hern families. In 1971 the first English dissertation was written on the material of the Ivanov archive - by James West, and in 1974 - an American dissertation (Alexei Klimov). After D. Ivanov was forced to move to Via Ercole Rosa in 1986, the author's principle of arrangement of materials was lost and the problem of sorting and scientific description of the archive arose.

As a result, in 1986-1996, D. V. Ivanov and A. B. Shishkin (a student of V. Manuilov, working at the University of Salerno), with the participation of specialists of the Pushkin House, carried out the first dismantling of the archive: L. N. Ivanova, O. A. Kuznetsova and M. B. Plukhanova. The collection of letters was also created. M. Wachtel (Princeton University) led the research work with German correspondents. According to D. Ivanov's will, the Rome Archives is a private research organization whose holdings cannot be dispersed or leave Rome. In 2006-2007, 95% of Ivanov's manuscript materials (about 25,000 images) were scanned and made publicly available on the website of the Vyach Ivanov Research Center. In 2011-2015, the inventory of the archive was published.

== Critics and historiography ==
Pamela Davidson (University College London) published a consolidated bibliography in 1995, in which she took into account 1,300 studies and critical reviews on Vyacheslav Ivanov's work. In her view, the study of Ivanov's work was divided into four broad periods. The first lasted from 1903 to 1925, that is, from the publication of the first collections of poems and scientific articles. Early reviews of Ivanov's poetry collections were polar opposites, written either by conservative critics of popular magazines or by Symbolist poets and critics for publications of their own movement. The public was clearly not ready to accept Vyacheslav Ivanovich's language and innovative ideas. P. Davidson even claimed that in the 1910s there was an indirect question of accepting the new poet into the tradition of Russian literature. P. Davidson even argued that in the 1910s there was an indirect question of accepting the new poet into the tradition of Russian literature. The themes of his poems seemed alien to real life, and his erudite allusions and archaic language were ridiculed. However, when Alexander Izmailov compared Ivanov to Trediakovsky, he was parried by Andrei Bely, who said that the latter was "Derzhavin, paving the way for the new Pushkin". Ivanov's reception by the younger generation of writers and poets, who were formed by the same sources (Solovyov, Nietzsche and Dostoevsky) quickly overcame the initial negativism of criticism. In the polemics of 1906-1907, Ivanov already appeared explicitly as an ideologue, and this approach took firm root. In the period of the crisis of symbolism, the publication of the collection of poems "Cor Ardens" and the collections of articles "Furrows and Mezhi" and "Native and Universal" finally established Ivanov in the role of a theorist and philosopher of culture. As such, his work became the subject of reflection by Berdyaev, S. Bulgakov, and L. Shestov. Zhirmunsky's article on overcoming symbolism, in which Ivanov was characterized as a precursor of the acmeists, had a great resonance.

The second period highlighted by P. Davidson is related to the politicization of Ivanov's legacy after his move to Italy. The attitude to the "Correspondence from two corners" and the article on the crisis of humanism, laid down in Soviet Russia and Europe, persists to this day. P. Davidson has noted that the "Correspondence" contributed more than all Ivanov's other works to the shift of interest from Vyacheslav the poet to Ivanov the philosopher. After 1924 the number of reviews of Ivanov in the USSR began to decline, as he was categorized as a "bourgeois decadent." In emigration, a substantial part of the published material was memoirs and critical articles, including those by N. Berdyaev, Z. Hippius, D. Svyatopolk-Mirsky, S. Frank, and F. Stepun. Ivanov's death in 1949 was widely covered in the émigré and European press, and obituaries deplored the oblivion of his name. There were calls for a more precise definition of his role in the culture of the 20th century. Ivanov was little known in Europe before his move to Italy; attention to his person was drawn, first, by the fact that he joined the Catholic Church (both in Catholic and ecumenical circles: Papini, Tyschiekevich), and, second, by Buber's publication of "Correspondence from two corners" in German, which led to translations into Italian and French. Ivanov's German monograph on Dostoevsky also received much attention. Western critical thought was long dominated by the image of Ivanov as a cultural philosopher and interpreter of Dostoyevsky. In turn, F. Stepun, I. Golenishchev-Kutuzov, and O. Schor (Deshart) made their own attempts to "bridge the gap" between Russian and Western perceptions of Ivanov.

The third period was marked by the publication of the collection The Light of Evening (1962) and the first volume of Ivanov's collected works in Brussels (1971), which included a comprehensive biography by O. Shor. Postwar critics began to study Ivanov's work. Since the mid-1960s, dissertations on Ivanov's work, his aesthetics, and his influence on Mandelstam and the Russian literary tradition have appeared. By 1987, four volumes of his collected works (out of a planned six) had been published, providing readers with a wealth of material and rare texts. Since the early 1980s, international symposia devoted to Ivanov have been organized at the universities of Yale (1981), Rome (1983), Pavia (1986), Heidelberg (1989), Geneva (1992), and Budapest (1995), each of which (except for the Roman one) was accompanied by the publication of a collection of articles. In the USSR, the 1960s saw the beginning of the publication of mainly archival material, such as N. Kotrelev's seminal article on Ivanov's Baku years. In 1976 a small volume was published in the series "The Poet's Library" with a foreword by S. Averintsev. After 1986, Vyacheslav Ivanov's archive became available and close cooperation between researchers began. Lidia Ivanova's memoirs were also published, which opened up new directions in biographical research, forming the fourth period of the study of Vyacheslav Ivanov's legacy.

== Publications ==
- Venceslaus Ivanov. De societatibus vectigalium publicorum populi romani = Общества государственных откупов в Римской республике: [lat.]. — СПб. : Записки Классического отделения Имп. Рус. Археологического Общества, 1910. — V. VI. — [7], 132 p.
- Вячеслав Иванов и М. О. Гершензон. Переписка из двух углов. — Пг. : Алконост, 1921. — 62 p.
- Иванов Вяч., Гершензон М. Переписка из двух углов / Подг. текста, прим., ист.-лит. комм, и иссл. Роберта Бёрда. — М.: Водолей Publishers; Прогресс-Плеяда, 2006. — 208 p. — ISBN 5-902312-60-4.
- Деяния св. Апостолов. Послания св. Апостолов. Откровение св. Иоанна. — Рим : Издание Рим.-Католической семинарии «Руссикум», 1946. — 532 p.
- Иванов Вяч. Собрание сочинений / Под ред. Д. В. Иванова и О. Дешарт; с введ. и примеч. О. Дешарт. — Брюссель : Foyer Oriental Chrétien, 1971. — V. 1. — 872 p.
- Иванов Вяч. Собрание сочинений / Под ред. Д. В. Иванова и О. Дешарт; с введ. и примеч. О. Дешарт. — Брюссель : Foyer Oriental Chrétien, 1974. — V. 2. — 852 p.
- Иванов Вяч. Собрание сочинений / Под ред. Д. В. Иванова и О. Дешарт; с введ. и примеч. О. Дешарт. — Брюссель : Foyer Oriental Chrétien, 1979. — V. 3. — 896 p.
- Иванов Вяч. Собрание сочинений / Под ред. Д. В. Иванова и О. Дешарт; с введ. и примеч. О. Дешарт; при участии А. Б. Шишкина. — Брюссель: Foyer Oriental Chrétien, 1987. — V. 4. — 800 p.
- Из переписки В. И. Иванова с А. Д. Скалдиным / Публ. М. Вахтеля // Минувшее: Ист. альм. — 1990. — № 10. — P. 121—141.
- Иванов Вячеслав. Дионис и прадионисийство. — М. : Алетейя, 1994. — 352 p. — (Античная библиотека. Исследования). — ISBN 5-86557-012-9.
- Иванов В. И. Родное и вселенское / Сост., вступит. ст. и прим. В. М. Толмачёва. — М. : Республика, 1994. — 428 p. — (Мыслители XX века). — ISBN 5-250-02436-X.
- Иванов Вяч. Лик и личины России. Эстетика и литературная теория / Вступ. ст., предисл. С. С. Аверинцева. — М. : Искусство, 1995. — 669 p. — (История эстетики в памятниках и документах). — ISBN 5-210-02056-8.
- Иванов Вячеслав. Стихотворения. Поэмы. Трагедия. В 2-х книгах / Сост. Р. Е. Помирчий; вст. ст. А. Е. Барзах. — СПб. : Академический проект, 1995. — Book 1. — 480 p. — (Новая библиотека поэта. Большая серия). — ISBN 5-7331-0069-9.
- Иванов Вячеслав. Стихотворения. Поэмы. Трагедия. В 2-х книгах / Сост. Р. Е. Помирчий; вст. ст. А. Е. Барзах. — СПб. : Академический проект, 1995. — Book 2. — 432 p. — (Новая библиотека поэта. Большая серия). — ISBN 5-7331-0070-2.
- История и поэзия: Переписка И. М. Гревса и Вяч. Иванова / Изд. текстов, исследование и комментарии Г. М. Бонгард-Левина, Н. В. Котрелёва, Е. В. Ляпустиной. — М.: Российская политическая энциклопедия (РОССПЭН), 2006. — 448 p. — ISBN 5-8243-0650-8.
- Иванов Вячеслав, Зиновьева-Аннибал Лидия. Переписка: 1894—1903 / Подг. текста Д. О. Солодкой и Н. А. Богомолова при участии М. Вахтеля. — М. : Новое литературное обозрение, 2009. — V. 1. — 752 p. — ISBN 978-5-86793-733-1.
- Иванов Вячеслав, Зиновьева-Аннибал Лидия. Переписка: 1894—1903 / Подг. текста Д. О. Солодкой и Н. А. Богомолова при участии М. Вахтеля. — М. : Новое литературное обозрение, 2009. — V. 2. — 568 p. — ISBN 978-5-86793-734-8.
- Иванов В. Повесть о Светомире царевиче / Изд. подготовили А. Л. Топорков, О. Л. Фетисенко, А. Б. Шишкин. — М. : Ладомир, Наука, 2015. — 824 p. — (Литературные памятники). — ISBN 978-5-86218-532-4.
- Эсхил. Трагедии в пер. Вячеслава Иванова / изд. подгот. Н. И. Балашов [и др.]. — М. : Наука, 1989. — 589 p. — (Литературные памятники). — ISBN 5-02-012688-8.

== Bibliography ==
Encyclopedic Sources

- Аверинцев С. С. Ива́нов Вячесла́в Ива́нович // Католическая энциклопедия. — М. : Издательство Францисканцев, 2005. — V. II. — p. 26—31. — 1818 стб. — ISBN 5-89208-054-4.
- Гоготишвили Л. А. Иванов Вячеслав Иванович // Новая философская энциклопедия. В четырёх томах / Научно-ред. совет: В. С. Стёпин, А. А. Гусейнов, Г. Ю. Семигин. — М. : Мысль, 2010. — V. II. — P. 65—66. — 634 p. — ISBN 978-5-244-01115-9.
- Иванов Вячеслав Иванович [Избранная библиография] // Русская литература конца XIX — начала XX века: библиографический указатель / Сост. Н. В. Котрелёв. — М. : ИМЛИ РАН, 2010. — V. I: А–М. — P. 607–695. — 953 p. — ISBN 978-5-9208-0355-9.
- Искржицкая И. Ю. Ива́нов Вячеслав Иванович // Русские писатели 20 века : Биографический словарь / Гл. ред. П. А. Николаев. — М. : Большая российская энциклопедия, Рандеву-АМ, 2000. — P. 301—303. — 808 p. — ISBN 5-85270-289-7.
- Лексикон русской литературы XX века = Lexikon der russischen Literatur ab 1917 / В. Казак; [пер. с нем.]. — М. : РИК «Культура», 1996. — XVIII, 491, [1] p. — 5000 экз. — ISBN 5-8334-0019-8.. — P. 161—162.
- Котрелёв Н. В. Ива́нов Вячеслав Иванович // Православная энциклопедия. — М. : Церковно-научный центр «Православная энциклопедия», 2009. — V. 20. — P. 645—652. — 752 p. — ISBN 978-5-89572-036-3.
- Михайловский Б. Иванов Вячеслав Иванович // Литературная энциклопедия: In 11 volumes. — М. : Изд-во Ком. Акад., 1930. — V. 4. — P. 404—409.
- Печко Л. П. Ива́нов Вяч. И. // Краткая литературная энциклопедия / Гл. ред. А. А. Сурков. — М. : Сов. энцикл., 1966. — V. 3: Иаков — Лакснесс. — P. 38—39.
- Русские писатели, 1800—1917 : Биографический словарь / гл. ред. П. А. Николаев. — М. : Большая российская энциклопедия, 1992. — V. 2 : Г—К. — P. 372—377. — 623 p. — (Сер. биогр. словарей: Русские писатели. 11—20 вв.). — 60 000 экз. — ISBN 5-85270-011-8. — ISBN 5-85270-064-9 (т. 2).
- Шруба М. Общество ревнителей художественного слова // Литературные объединения Москвы и Петербурга 1890—1917 годов: Словарь. — М.: Новое литературное обозрение, 2004. — P. 156—159. — 448 p. — ISBN 5-86793-293-1.

Primary Sources

- Archivio italo-russo II = Русско-итальянский архив II / a cura di Cristiano Diddi e Andrei Shishkin. — Salerno, 2001. — Iss. 2. — 344 p. — (Collana di Europa orientalis, ISSN 0392-4580). — ISBN 978-88-6235-021-1.
- Archivio italo-russo III = Русско-итальянский архив III : Vjačeslav Ivanov - Testi inediti / a cura di Daniela Rizzi e Andrei Shishkin. — Salerno, 2001. — 574 p. — (Collana di Europa orientalis, ISSN 0392-4580).
- Альтман М. С. Разговоры с Вячеславом Ивановым / Составление и подготовка текстов В. А. Дымшица и К. Ю. Лаппо-Данилевского. Статья и комментарии К. Ю. Лаппо-Данилевского. — СПб. : Инапресс, 1995. — 384 p. — (Свидетели истории). — ISBN 5-87135-020-8.
- Вячеслав Иванов. Материалы и исследования. — М. : Наследие, 1996. — 392 p. — ISBN 5-86562-027-4.
- Вяч. Иванов: pro et contra, антология / Сост. К. Г. Исупов, А. Б. Шишкин; коммент. Е. В. Глуховой, К. Г. Исупова, С. Д. Титаренко, А. Б. Шишкина и др. — СПб. : РХГА, 2016. — V. 1. — 996 p. — (Русский путь). — ISBN 978-5-88812-724-7.
- Вяч. Иванов: pro et contra, антология / Сост. К. Г. Исупов, А. Б. Шишкин; коммент. коллектива авт. — СПб. : ЦСО, 2016. — V. 2. — 960 p. — (Русский путь). — ISBN 978-5-906623-17-1.
- Кузмин М. А. Дневник 1934 года / под ред. со вступ. ст. и примеч. Г. Морева. — СПб. : Издательство Ивана Лимбаха, 1998. — 408 p. — ISBN 978-5-89059-114-2.
- Лидия Иванова. Воспоминания. Книга об отце. — М. : Феникс, 1992. — 432 p. — ISBN 5-85042-038-X.

Research in Russian language

- Аверинцев С. С. «Скворешниц вольных гражданин…» Вячеслав Иванов: путь поэта между мирами. — СПб. : Алетейя, 2002. — 167 p. — ISBN 5-89329-452-1.
- Бёрд Р. Вячеслав Иванов за рубежом // Русское зарубежье: история и современность. — 2011. — N. 1. — P. 179—206. — ISBN 978-5-248-00613-7.
- Богданова О. А. Вячеслав Иванов и становление науки о Достоевском на рубеже 1910–1920-х годов (М. М. Бахтин, Б. М. Энгельгардт, В. Л. Комарович) // Литературоведческий журнал. — 2016. — № 39: К 200-летию смерти Г. Р. Державина. — P. 143—170.
- Богомолов Н. А. Из итальянских впечатлений Вячеслава Иванова // Europa Orientalis. — 2012. — Vol. 21, no. 2. — P. 105—114.
- Бычков В. В. Русская теургическая эстетика. — М. : Ладомир, 2007. — 743 p. — ISBN 978-5-86218-468-6.
- Венцлова Т. Собеседники на пиру: Литературоведческие работы. — М. : Новое литературное обозрение, 2012. — 624 p. — (Новое литературное обозрение. Литературное приложение. Выпуск CVIII). — ISBN 978-5-86793-953-3.
- Вячеслав Иванов. Архивные материалы и исследования / Отв. ред.: Гоготишвили Л. А., Казарян А. Т. — М. : Русские словари, 1999. — 488 p. — ISBN 5-93259-002-5.
- Вячеслав Иванов. Исследования и материалы / Ответственные редакторы К. Ю. Лаппо-Данилевский, А. Б. Шишкин. — СПб. : Издательство Пушкинского Дома, 2010. — Iss. 1. — 840 p. — ISBN 978-5-87781-015-0.
- Вячеслав Иванов. Исследования и материалы / Отв. редакторы: Н. Ю. Грякалова, А. Б. Шишкин. — СПб. : РХГА, 2016. — Вып. 2. — 512 с. — ISBN 978-5-88812-722-3.
- Вячеслав Иванов и его время : материалы VII Междунар. симп., Вена 1998 / Ред.: Сергей Аверинцев, Роземари Циглер. — Frankfurt am. M. : Lang, 2002. — 585 p. — ISBN 3-631-36768-6.
- Вячеслав Иванов — Петербург — мировая культура: материалы международной научной конференции 9—11 September 2002. — Томск—М. : Водолей Publishers, 2003. — 328 p. — ISBN 5-902312-04-3.
- Климов А. Вячеслав Иванов в Италии (1924—1949) // Русская литература в эмиграции: Сб. ст. / Под ред. Н. П. Полторацкого. — Питтсбург : Отдел славянских литератур и культур Питтсбургского университета, 1972. — P. 151—165. — VIII, 409, [5] p. — (Slavic series; № 1).
- Литература русского зарубежья (1920–1940) : учебник для высших учебных заведений / отв. ред. Б. В. Аверин, Н. А. Карпов, С. Д. Титаренко. — СПб. : Филологический факультет СПбГУ, 2013. — 848 p. — ISBN 978-5-903549-13-9.
- Литература русского зарубежья (1920—1940): практикум-хрестоматия / сост. С. Д. Титаренко. — СПб. : Филологический факультет СПбГУ, 2010. — 382 p. — (Русский мир: учебники для высшей школы). — ISBN 978-5-8465-1052-4.
- Обатнин Г. В. Штрихи к портрету Вяч. Иванова эпохи революций 1917 года // Русская литература. — 1997. — № 2. — P. 224—230.
- Обатнин Г. Иванов-мистик (Оккультные мотивы в поэзии и прозе Вячеслава Иванова (1907—1919). — М. : Новое литературное обозрение, 2000. — 240 p. — ISBN 5-86793-122-6.
- Павлова Л. В. У каждого за плечами звери: символика животных в лирике Вячеслава Иванова: Монография. — Смоленск : СГПУ, 2004. — 264 p. — ISBN 5-88018-370-X.
- Святополк-Мирский Д. С. История русской литературы с древнейших времён по 1925 год / Пер. с англ. Р. Зерновой. — Новосибирск : Свиньин и сыновья, 2005. — 964 p. — ISBN 5-98502-019-3.
- Русская литература рубежа веков (1890-е—начало 1920-х годов) / Отв. ред. В. А. Келдыш. — М. : ИМЛИ РАН : Наследие, 2000. — Кн. 1. — 958, [2] p. — ISBN 5-9208-0063-1.
- Русская литература рубежа веков (1890-е—начало 1920-х годов) / Отв. ред. В. А. Келдыш. — М. : ИМЛИ РАН : Наследие, 2001. — Кн. 2. — 765, [2] p. — ISBN 5-9208-0090-9.
- Святополк-Мирский Д. С. История русской литературы с древнейших времён по 1925 год / Пер. с англ. Р. Зерновой. — Новосибирск : Свиньин и сыновья, 2005. — 964 p. — ISBN 5-98502-019-3.
- Сегал Д. Вячеслав Иванов и семья Шор (По материалам рукописного отдела Национальной и Университетской Библиотеки в Иерусалиме) // Cahiers du Monde Russe. — 1994. — Vol. 35, no. 1—2. — P. 331—352.
- Селиванов В. В. Вяч. И. Иванов и Н. Я. Марр в жизни и творческой судьбе К. М. Колобовой // МНЕМОН. Исследования и публикации по истории античного мира / Под редакцией профессора Э. Д. Фролова. — 2006. — Iss. 5. — P. 487—510.
- Степанова Г. А. Идея «соборного театра» в поэтической философии Вячеслава Иванова. — М. : ГИТИС, 2005. — 139 p.
- Тернова Т. А. Публицистический цикл Вячеслава Иванова о революции и Первой мировой войне // Научный вестник Воронежского государственного архитектурно-строительного университета: Лингвистика и межкультурная коммуникация. — 2017. — Iss. 2 (25). — P. 29—34.
- Титаренко С. Д. От мелоса — к логосу: миф и музыка в философии искусства Вячеслава Иванова // Вестник Русской христианской гуманитарной академии. — 2014. — V. 15, № 4. — P. 150—160. — ISSN 1819-2777.
- Топорков А. Л. Источники «Повести о Светомире царевиче» Вяч. Иванова: древняя и средневековая книжность и фольклор. — М. : Индрик, 2012. — 486 p. — ISBN 978-5-91674-234-3.
- Философия. Литература. Искусство: Андрей Белый, Вячеслав Иванов, Александр Скрябин / под ред. К. Г. Исупова. — М. : РОССПЭН, 2013. — 478 p. — (Философия России первой половины XX века). — ISBN 978-5-8243-1746-6.
- Шишкин А. Вячеслав Иванов и Италия // Русско-итальянский архив. — 1997. — P. 503—562.

Research in English language

- Bird R. The Russian Prospero : the creative universe of Viacheslav Ivanov. — Madison : The University of Wisconsin Press, 2006. — 310 p. — ISBN 0-299-21830-9.
- Creating Life: The Aesthetic Utopia of Russian Modernism / Ed. by Irina Paperno and Joan Delaney Grossman. — Stanford : Stanford University Press, 1994. — 300 p. — ISBN 0-8047-2288-9.
- Davidson P. Vyacheslav Ivanov's Translations of Dante // Oxford Slavonic Papers. New Series. — 1982. — Vol. XV. — P. 103—131.
- Davidson P. The poetic imagination of Vyacheslav Ivanov: a Russian symbolist's perception of Dante. — Cambridge University Press, 1989. — 319 p. — (Cambridge studies in Russian literature). — ISBN 0-521-36285-7.
- Davidson P. Viacheslav Ivanov: A reference guide. — N. Y. : G. K. Hall & Co. An Imprint of Simon & Schuster Macmillan, 1996. — xlii, 382 p. — (A Reference Guide to Literature Series). — ISBN 0-8161-1825-6.
- Kalb J. E. Russia’s Rome : imperial visions, messianic dreams, 1890—1940. — Madison : The University of Wisconsin Press, 2008. — 299 p. — ISBN 978-0-299-22920-7.
- Kleberg L. Theatre as Action. Soviet Russian Avant-Garde Aesthetics / Translated from Swedish by Charles Rougle. — L. : Macmillan, 1993. — 152 p. — ISBN 978-0-333-56817-0.
- Plioukhanova M., Shishkin A. The Museum and the Research Centre Vyacheslav Ivanov Archive in Rome: Literature, music, art, and the city // Literature, Music, and Cultural Heritage Proceedings of the ICLM Annual Conference 2015. — 2016. — P. 90—101. — ISBN 978-5-93322-112-8
