= Viktor Bychkov =

Viktor Bychkov may refer to

- Viktor Bychkov (actor) (born 1954), Russian actor
- Viktor Bychkov (athlete) (born 1938), Russian sprinter
- Viktor Bychkov (philosopher) (born 1942), Russian philosopher
