= Pyotr Evdoshenko =

Russian poet

- Петр Иванович Евдошенко
- Born: ~1890; Pyriatyn, Poltava Governorate
- Died: nearly 1920
- Occupation: Poet
- Parent: Ivan Evdoshenko
- Writing career
- Language: Russian
- Period: Silver Age of Russian Poetry
- Genre: Lyric poetry
- Notable work: Cascade Splashes
- Literary movement: Russian symbolism

Signature
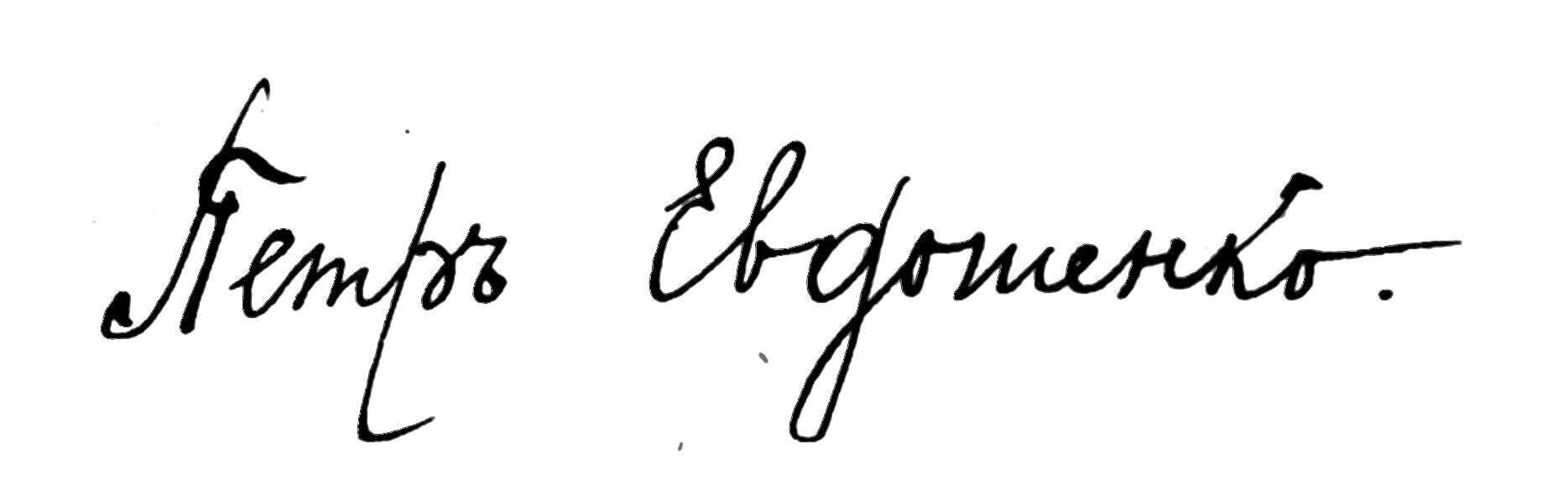

Pyotr Ivanovich Evdóshenko (Russian: Петр Иванович Евдошенко; ~1890 – nearly 1920) is considered to be as one of the prominent poets of the Silver Age of Russian Poetry.

== Life ==
Pyotr Evdoshenko was born in the city of Pyriatyn, Poltava Governorate of The Russian Empire, into the family of employees. His father, Ivan Evdoshenko, was the trustee (abbot) of all educational institutions of the entire county. Pyotr's sister, Catherine, also chose to work in the field of education (she taught Russian language), later she was granted the title of Honored Schoolteacher. Pyotr Ivanovich's ancestor, Stepan Ivanovich, was a Collegiate assessor and the chair of Gentry assembly of Simferopol, Taurida Governorate, for which he was awarded Insignia of irreproachable service.

Pyotr Evdoshenko was on good friendly terms with Andrei Bely and Igor Severyanin.

Evdoshenko died of tuberculosis before he was even 30 years old.

== Literary career ==
Pyotr Evdoshenko is an author of the poetry collection “Cascade Splashes” (1917, Pyriatyn). The first edition was issued in the city of Pyriatyn, Poltava Governorate, and that copy is kept in the National Library of Russia in Saint Petersburg. In 2007 the book was republished in Moscow.

Manuscripts of several poems are kept in Russian State Archive of Literature and Art. They are held in the collection of bibliographer, literary critic and historian Evdoksia Nikitina Feodorovna, who is also the chairman of the board of cooperative publishing house Nikitin's subbotniks.

On the basis of Evdoshenko's poems Lilacs in bloom (Сирень цветёт), On a golden day (В золотистый день) and Suddenly (Вдруг) were shot several art-videos.

=== Poetry collections ===
- Евдошенко П. И. (1917). Брызги каскадные: Сборник стихов [Cascade Splashes. The poetry collection]. Пирятин: тип. Селецкого и Любинского.
- Евдошенко П. И. (2007). Брызги каскадные: Сборник стихов. Серебряный век. Открытые имена [Cascade Splashes. The poetry collection. Silver Age. Discoveries names] (3000 ed.). М.: ООО «Тетру». ISBN 978-5-98396-010-7.

== Works cited ==
- Turchinski L. M. (2007). Русские поэты XX века. Справочник [Russian poets of 20th century] (in Russian). Moscow: Znak. p. 186. ISBN 978-5-9551-0194-1.
- Tarasenkov A.K., Turchinski L. M. (2004). Русские поэты XX века. 1905-1955. Материалы для библиографии [Russian poets of 20th century. 1905-1955] (in Russian). Moscow: Языки славянской культуры. p. 249. ISBN 5-94457-175-6.
- Petrov S.J. (1996). Книга в Україні: друга половина ХІХ-початок ХХ ст., 1861-1917: бібліографічний покажчик [Book in Ukraine. the first half of the 19th- the beginning of the 20th centuries, 1861-1917] (in Ukrainian). Vol. 6. Kyiv: Vidrodz͡henni͡a. ISBN 9-6602-1343-3.
- The Imperial Academy of Sciences (1832). "Taurida Governorate". Месяцеслов и общий штат Российской империи на 1832. Адрес-календарь [Menologion and Common Staff of The Russian Empire] (in Russian). Vol. 2. Saint Petersburg: The Imperial Academy of Sciences. p. 180.
