= Lyudmila Petranovskaya =

Russian psychologist

- Born: 1967 (age 57–58)
- Occupation(s): Psychologist, writer, lecturer
- Years active: 1998-present
- Known for: School for Adoptive Parents, Family Development University

Lyudmila Petranovskaya (Russian: Лю́дмила Влади́мировна Петрано́вская) is a Russian psychologist and parenting expert, specialist in adoption, founder of the School for Adoptive Parents.

She started as a therapist for orphans, with the time she participated in numerous governmental and private initiatives aimed to raise awareness on problems of orphans, educate adoptive parents and moreover, shift the legislation in Russia to more humane treatment of orphaned children. In 2012 she co-founded the Family Development University that offers assistance to adoptive families.

In 2002 Petrsnovskaya was honoured with the Presidential Award in Education. She has published more than 15 books and numerous articles on family psychology.

== Literature ==
- Bluhm, Katharina; Pickhahn, Gertrud; Stypińska, Justyna; Wierzcholska, Agnieszka (2020). Gender and Power in Eastern Europe: Changing Concepts of Femininity and Masculinity in Power Relations. Springer Nature. p. 111. ISBN 978-3-030-53129-4.
- Bodovski, Katerina (2019). Childhood and Education in the United States and Russia: Sociological and Comparative Perspectives. Emerald Group Publishing. p. 55-56. ISBN 9781787147799.
