= Viktor Bychkov (philosopher) =

Soviet and Russian philosopher (born 1942)

- Born: Viktor Vasilyevich Bychkov; 4 September 1942 (age 83); Moscow, Soviet Union
- Citizenship: Soviet→ Russian
- Occupations: Philosopher, Scholar
- Awards: State Prize of the Russian Federation

Viktor Vasilyevich Bychkov (Russian: Виктор Васильевич Бычков; born 4 September 1942, Moscow) is a Soviet and Russian philosopher, historian of aesthetics, doctor of philosophy. His research interests include Byzantine, Russian religious aesthetics of the twentieth century, philosophy and phenomenology of modern art.

== Biography ==
V. V. Bychkov graduated from the Radio Engineering Faculty of Moscow Power Engineering Institute (1965) and attended a post-graduate study at the Faculty of Philosophy of Moscow State University in the Department of Aesthetics. In 1972, V. V. Bychkov completed PhD, becoming the candidate of Philosophical Sciences with the dissertation "Interrelation of philosophical religious and aesthetic in Eastern Christian art". Since 1972, he has been working at the Institute of Philosophy of the USSR Academy of Sciences (RAS). Since 1998 — as a head of the aesthetics sector. In 1981, Bychkov obtained a doctoral degree, dissertation – "Aesthetic ideas of patristics". He is also a laureate of the State Prize of Russian Federation in the field of science and technology (1996) for the monograph "Culture of Byzantium in IV—XV centuries" in three volumes.

== Research activity ==
V. V. Bychkov defines aesthetics as a way of “belonging to being”. Aesthetic experience has been inseparable from religious experience since primitive times. The category of the beautiful (nefer) has been known since ancient Egypt and aesthetics as a discipline was formed in Antiquity (by Pythagoreans and Plato), it was then that the dualistic subject of aesthetics was defined: aesthetic and art. Bychkov divides aesthetics itself into implicit (hidden) and explicit (theoretical). Within implicit aesthetics he especially highlights the "Byzantine aesthetics" (so-called aesthetics of the Fathers of Church), associated with the categories of image (mimetic, symbolic and iconic), spiritual beauty and creativity. Bychkov calls Pseudo-Dionysius the pinnacle of "Byzantine aesthetics", who distinguished the construction (analogy), likening and imitation (mimesis), and also elaborates in detail the concept of a symbol. The striking expression of Byzantine aesthetics is an icon ("visual narrative"), which has a "contemplative-anagogic" (or "contemplative-erecting") function. V. V. Bychkov attributed the following characteristic features of Russian aesthetics: "sophism" – the unity of wisdom and beauty or expressed ideality), "sobornost" (rus. cоборность) – supra-individuality and "theurgy" – the idea of the transformation of the world.

When describing modernity, V. V. Bychkov uses the concept of "post-culture" (as the antithesis of the traditional spiritual world of Culture), where the role of the creator is belittled, and the artist becomes "a tool in the hands of curators". The main features of post-culture are contextualism, equalization of all meanings, bringing marginality to the fore, replacing traditional imagery and symbolism with simulation and simulacrum; artistry — with intertextuality, polystylism, citation; conscious mixing of elements of high and popular culture in the concept of an artifact, the dominance of kitsch and camp, the removal of value criteria, the absolutization of any gesture of the artist as a unique and significant phenomenon". Bychkov assesses the prospects of post-culture pessimistically as a "drift of values into infinite uncertainty".

== Main works ==
- Bychkov, V.V. Symbolic aesthetics of Dionysius Areopagita [Text] / V.V. Bychkov; Russian Academy of Sciences, Institute ofPhilosophy. – M. : IFRAN, 2015. – 143 p.
- Bychkov V. V. Vizantijskaya estetika. Teoreticheskie problemy. — M.: Iskusstvo, 1977.
- Bychkov V. V. Estetika pozdnej antichnosti. II—III veka. — M.: Nauka, 1981.
- Bychkov V. V. Estetika Avreliya Avgustina. — M.: Iskusstvo, 1984.
- Bychkov V. V. Malaya istoriya vizantijskoj estetiki. — Kiev: Put' k Istine, 1991.
- Bychkov V. V. Russkaya srednevekovaya estetika. XI—XVII veka. — M.: Mysl', 1992, 2-e izd. 1995.
- Bychkov V. V. The Aesthetic Face of Being. Art in the Theology of Pavel Florensky. — Crestwood, NY: St.Vladimir's Seminary Press, 1993.
- Bychkov V. V. Duhovno-esteticheskie osnovy russkoj ikony. — M.: Ladomir, 1995.
- Bychkov V. V. Estetika otcov cerkvi. — M., Ladomir, 1995.
- Bychkov V. V. 2000 let hristianskoj kul'tury sub specie aesthetica. V 2-h tomah. — SPb. — M.: Universitetskaya kniga, 1999; 2-e izd. 2007.
- Bychkov V. V. Estetika. — M., Gardariki, 2002 (2-e ispr. izd. 2004, 3-e izd. 2007)
- Bychkov V. V. Estetika. Kratkij kurs. — M.: Proekt, 2003.
- Bychkov V. V. Leksikon nonklassiki. Hudozhestvenno-esteticheskaya kul'tura XX veka (avtor proekta, vedushchij avtor, rukovoditel' avtorskogo kollektiva, otv. redaktor V. Bychkov). — M.: ROSSPEN, 2003.
- Bychkov V. V. Russkaya teurgicheskaya estetika. — M.: Ladomir, 2005.
- Bychkov V. V. Hudozhestvennyj apokalipsis kultury. Stromaty XX veka. V 2 knigah. — M.: Kul'turnaya revolyuciya, 2008.
- Estetika: Kratkij kurs. M.: Akademicheskij proekt, 2009. — 452 s.
- Fenomen ikony: Istoriya. Bogoslovie. Estetika. Iskusstvo. M.: Ladomir, 2008. — 633 s. + 173 il.
- Esteticheskaya aura bytiya: Sovremennaya estetika kak nauka i filosofiya iskusstva. M.: Izdatel'stvo MBA, 2010. — 784 s. (2-e izd. M.-SPb: Centr gumanitarnyh iniciativ, 2016).
