= Silver Age of Russian Poetry =

20th century period in Russia known for great poetry

Silver Age (Сере́бряный век) is a term traditionally applied by Russian philologists to the last decade of the 19th century and first two or three decades of the 20th century. It was an exceptionally creative period in the history of Russian poetry, on par with the Golden Age a century earlier. The term Silver Age was first suggested by philosopher Nikolai Berdyaev, but it only became customary to refer thus to this era in literature in the 1960s. In the Western world other terms, including Fin de siècle and Belle Époque, are somewhat more popular. In contrast to the Golden Age, female poets and writers influenced the movement considerably, and the Silver Age is considered to be the beginning of the formal academic and social acceptance of women writers into the Russian literary sphere.

== History ==
Although the Silver Age may be said to have truly begun with the appearance of Alexander Blok's "Verses about the Beautiful Lady", many scholars have extended its chronological framework to include the works of the 1890s, starting with Nikolai Minsky's manifesto "With the light of conscience" (1890), Dmitri Merezhkovsky's treatise "About the reasons for the decline of contemporary Russian literature" (1893), Valery Bryusov's almanac "Russian symbolists" (1894), and poetry by Konstantin Balmont and Mirra Lokhvitskaya.

The early 20th century was the period of both social and cultural upheavals and pursuits. Realistic portrayal of life did not satisfy authors any longer, and their argument with the classics of the 19th century generated a bundle of new literary movements.

Although the Silver Age was dominated by the artistic movements of Russian Symbolism, Acmeism, and Russian Futurism, many poetic schools flourished, including the Mystical Anarchism tendency within the Symbolist movement. There were also such poets as Ivan Bunin and Marina Tsvetayeva who refused to align themselves with any of these movements. Alexander Blok emerged as the leading poet, respected by virtually everyone. The poetic careers of Anna Akhmatova, Boris Pasternak, and Osip Mandelshtam, all of them spanning many decades, were also launched during that period.

The Silver Age ended after the Russian Civil War. Blok's death and Nikolai Gumilev's execution in 1921, as well as the appearance of the highly influential Pasternak collection, My Sister is Life (1922), marked the end of the era. The Silver Age was nostalgically looked back to by émigré poets, led by Georgy Ivanov in Paris and Vladislav Khodasevich in Berlin.

== See also ==
- List of Russian-language poets
- Fin de siècle
- Vyacheslav Ivanov's work
- Russian cosmism
