= The Village of Stepanchikovo =

1859 novel by Fyodor Dostoevsky

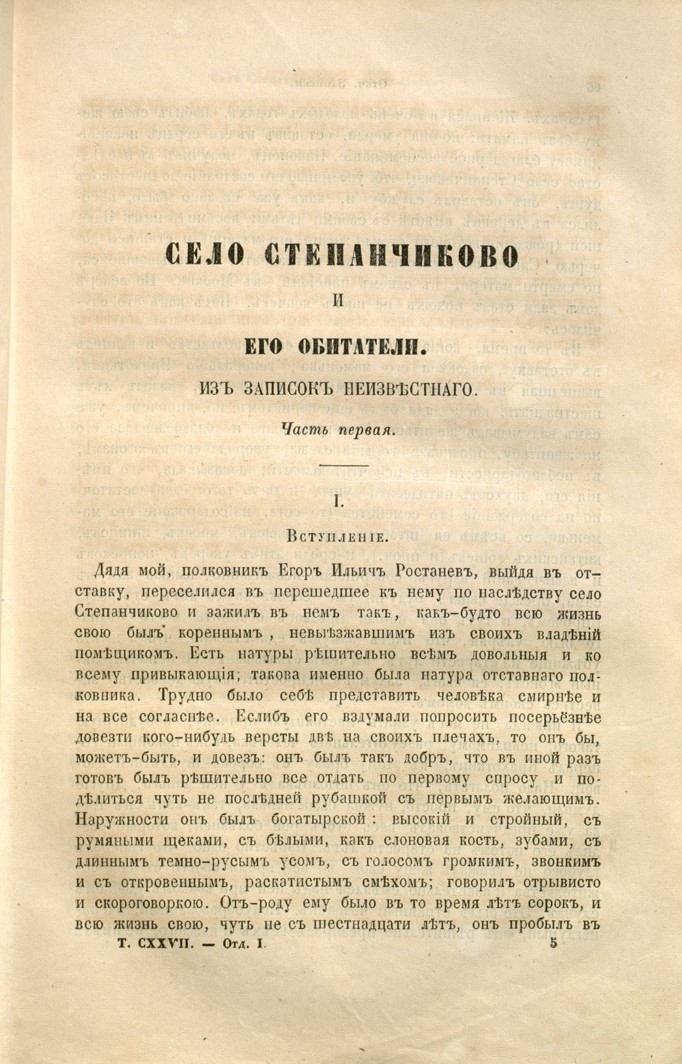
- Author: Fyodor Dostoevsky
- Original title: Село Степанчиково и его обитатели
- Translator: Various
- Language: Russian
- Genre: Satirical novel
- Publisher: Otechestvennye Zapiski
- Publication date: 1859
- Publication place: Russia
- Media type: Print

The Village of Stepanchikovo and Its Inhabitants: From the Notes of an Unknown (Russian: Село Степанчиково и его обитатели. Из записок неизвестного, Selo Stepanchikovo i ego obitateli. Iz zapisok neizvestnogo), also known as The Friend of the Family, is a novel written by Fyodor Dostoevsky and first published in 1859.

== Summary ==
Sergey Alexandrovich (Сергей Александрович), the narrator, is summoned from St. Petersburg to the estate of his uncle, Colonel Yegor Ilyich Rostanev (Егор Ильич Ростанев), and finds that a middle-aged charlatan named Foma Fomich Opiskin (Фома Фомич Опискин) has swindled the nobles around him into believing that he is virtuous despite behavior that is passive-aggressive, selfish, and spiteful. Foma obliges the servants to learn French, and gets furious when they are caught dancing the kamarinskaya.

Uncle Yegor asks Sergey to marry the poor young girl Nastenka. It turns out Uncle Yegor is in love with her himself, but Foma wants him to marry the wealthy Tatyana Ivanova instead. Tatyana has several other suitors, including Mizinchikov, who confides in Sergey about his plans to elope with her.

The next morning Tatyana has eloped, not with Mizinchikov but with Obnoskin, who acted under the influence of his mother. After a pursuit Tatyana returns voluntarily. At Stepanchikovo Foma Fomich is furious because Uncle Yegor has been caught red-handed during an assignation in the garden with Nastenka. Foma leaves, but falls into a ditch. The inhabitants beg him to come back. A general reconciliation follows after Foma, manipulating as ever, gives his blessing to a marriage between Uncle Yegor and Nastenka.

== Characters ==
- Foma Fomich Opiskin: fifty years old
- Sergey Alexandrovich - Seryozha: the narrator, nephew of the colonel, twenty-two years old
- Yegor Ilyich Rostanev: the colonel, forty years old, retired
- Ilyusha: Rostanev's son, eight years old
- Sasha or Sashenka: Rostanev's daughter, fifteen years old
- Nastasya Yevgrafovna - Nastenka: the children's governess
- Yevgraf Larionych Yezhevikin: a serf, Nastenka's father
- Krakhotkin the General's lady: Rostanev's mother
- Miss Perepelitsyna: confidante of the General's lady
- Praskovya Ilyinichna: Rostanev's sister
- Stepan Alekseyich Bakhcheyev: Rostanev's friend
- Ivan Ivanych Mizinchikov: Rostanev's distant cousin, twenty-eight years old
- Pavel Semyonych Obnoskin: a guest of Rostanev's, twenty-five years old
- Anfisa Petrovna: Obnoskin's mother, fifty years old
- Tatyana Ivanovna: an old maid, thirty-five years old
- Korovkin: Rostanev's friend
- Gavrila Ignatych: a valet
- Grigory Vidoplyasov: a valet
- Falaley: a house-boy, sixteen years old

== Background ==
Foma Opiskin was based on Nikolai Gogol in his last years. Foma's speeches are parodies of Gogol's Selected Passages from Correspondence with Friends, Opiskin's mannerisms, appearance and even personality are also based on Gogol.

The story has the structure of a comedy; it was originally intended as a play.

Dostoevsky wrote this novel for Mikhail Katkov, main editor of The Russian Messenger. In a letter to his brother Mikhail, Dostoevsky wrote: "The long story that I am writing for Katkov displeases me very much and goes against the grain. But I have already written a great deal, it's impossible to throw it away in order to begin another, and I have to pay back a debt."

In a later letter he sounded more optimistic: "I am convinced that there are many weak and bad things in my novel; but I am convinced — I stake my life on it! — that there are very fine things. They sprang from the heart. There are scenes of high comedy that Gogol would have signed without hesitation."

He submitted the novel to The Russian Messenger, but Katkov rejected it. Next he submitted it to The Contemporary, which accepted the novel, but at what Dostoevsky considered a humiliatingly low price. The editor of The Contemporary, Nekrasov, was very negative: "Dostoevsky is finished. He will no longer write anything important." The novel was ultimately published in Krayevsky's National Annals.

== Literary significance ==
Stepanchikovo also lacks the intellectual passionateness and richness of the essential Dostoyevsky, but in other respects it is one of the most characteristic of his works. All his great novels have a construction that is dramatic rather than narrative. They can easily and without substantial changes in their construction be turned into plays. Stepanchikovo is the most dramatic of all (it was originally planned as a play). Only, of course, it is far too long for the theatre. It is also interesting for the way it displays what Mikhaylovsky called the "cruelty" of Dostoyevsky. Its subject is the intolerable psychological bullying inflicted by the hypocrite and parasite, Foma Opiskin, on his host, Colonel Rostanev. The imbecile meekness with which the Colonel consents to be bullied and allows all around him, his friends and servants, to be bullied by Opiskin, and the perverse inventiveness of Foma in devising various psychological humiliations for his victims produce an impression of intolerable, almost physical, pain. Foma Opiskin is a weird figure of grotesque, gratuitous, irresponsible, petty, and ultimately joyless evil, that together with Saltykov's Porfiri Golovlev and Sologub's Peredonov form a trinity to which probably no foreign literature has anything to compare.

— D. S. Mirsky
