= The Petty Demon =

1905 symbolist novel by Russian writer Fyodor Sologub

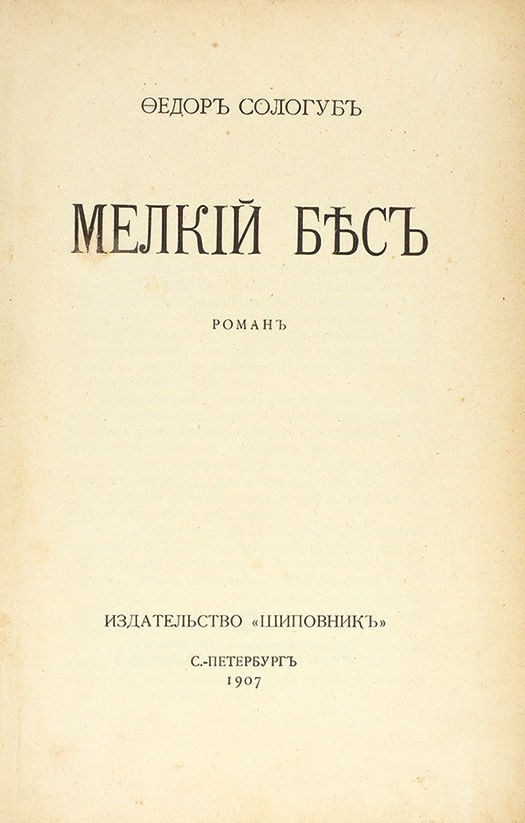
- The Petty Demon Russian cover
- Author: Fyodor Sologub
- Original title: Мелкий бес
- Language: Russian
- Genre: Symbolist novel
- Publication date: 1905
- Publication place: Russia

The Petty Demon (Russian: Мелкий бес, romanized: Melkiy bes), also translated as The Little Demon, is a Symbolist novel by Russian writer Fyodor Sologub. It was published in a stand-alone edition in 1907 and quickly became popular, having ten printings during the author's lifetime.

== Plot ==
The novel recounts the story of the sadist schoolteacher Peredonov in an unnamed Russian provincial town. A second plotline presents the idyllic love of the boy Sasha Pylnikov and the girl Ludmila Rutilova. Peredonov lives in constant hatred of the world around him and of life itself, and he believes that everyone constantly hates him. Throughout the novel Peredonov struggles to be promoted to governmental inspector of his province, starts becoming paranoid, and hallucinates a mysterious little demon Nedotykomka. He finally commits murder in a state of insanity.

== Literary significance ==
The realistic and satirical depiction of Russian provincial life and the omniscient third-person narrative allowed Sologub to combine his Symbolist tendencies and the tradition of Russian Realism in which he engaged throughout his earlier novels, a style similar to Maupassant's fantastic realism.

The novel may be read as a satire on Russian provincial life, but Sologub's intention was to paint life itself as an evil creation of God. The grotesque Russian town and the world of The Petty Demon are incarnations of poshlost', a Russian concept that has characteristics of both evil and banality, and Peredonov and his demon Nedotykomka are the personifications of poshlost'. As D. S. Mirsky wrote in 1925, "Peredonov has become the most famous and memorable character of Russian fiction since The Brothers Karamazov", and his name has become a word of the literary language: "It stands for the incarnation of sullen evil, which knows no joy and resents others' knowing it". According to Mirsky, Peredonov forms a "trinity" together with Fyodor Dostoevsky's Foma Opiskin and Mikhail Saltykov-Shchedrin's Porfiry Golovlyov.

The book puts on display a Freudian treasure chest of perversions with subtlety and credibility. The name of the novel's hero, Peredonov, became a symbol of calculating concupiscence for an entire generation... He torments his students, derives erotic satisfaction from watching them kneel to pray, and systematically befouls his apartment before leaving it as part of his generalized spite against the universe.

— James H. Billington

== English translations ==
- The Little Demon authorized trans. John Cournos and Richard Aldington (London: Martin Secker, 1916).
- The Petty Demon trans. Andrew Field (New York: Random House, 1962).
- The Petty Demon trans. Samuel D. Cioran (Ann Arbor: Ardis, 1983) (with an appendix and critical articles, ed. Murl Barker). ISBN 0882338072.
- The Little Demon trans. Ronald Wilks (New York: Penguin, 1994) (Penguin Twentieth Century Classics). ISBN 9781480625570.

== See also ==
- The Silver Dove
- Petersburg (novel)
- Russian symbolism
