= Glumov =

Glumov (masculine), Glumova (feminine) is a Russian-language surname. Notable people with the surname include:

- Ivan Glumov, Russian oceanologist

== Fictional characters ==
- Maya Glumova, Toivo Glumov, characters from several novels by Russian science fiction writers Strugatsky brothers
- Yegor Glumov (also transliterated as Egor Glumov)
  - Protagonist of the 1868 comedy Enough Stupidity in Every Wise Man
  - Protagonist of Glumov's Diary, a 1923 Soviet short silent film directed by Sergei Eisenstein as part of a production of the comedy
  - Character from Crazy Money, a 1981 Soviet comedy film and 1870 comedy novel by Alexander Ostrovsky
- Character from Modern Idyll, a 1877—1883 satirical novel by Mikhail Saltykov-Shchedrin
