= House of Greed =

1933 film

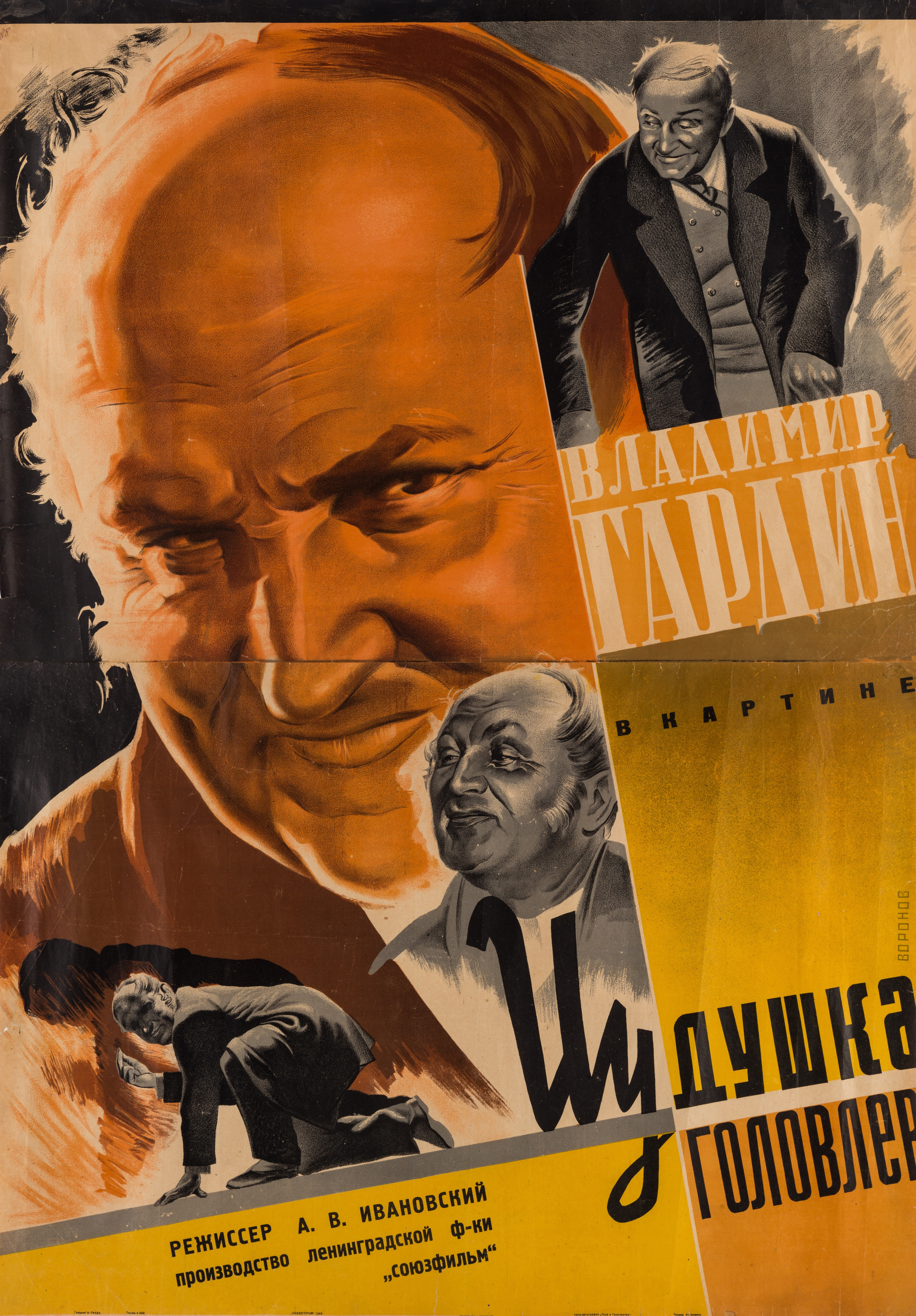
- Russian: Иудушка Головлёв
- Directed by: Aleksandr Ivanovsky
- Written by: Konstantin Derzhavin; Aleksandr Ivanovsky; Mikhail Saltykov-Shchedrin (novel)
- Starring: Vladimir Gardin; Tatyana Bulakh-Gardina; Nina Latonina; Yekaterina Korchagina-Aleksandrovskaya; Mikhail Tarkhanov
- Cinematography: Vasili Simbirtsev
- Music by: Andrei Pashchenko
- Production company: Lensoyuzfilm
- Release date: 1933
- Running time: 94 min.
- Country: Soviet Union
- Language: Russian

House of Greed (Russian: Иудушка Головлёв) is a 1933 Soviet film directed by Aleksandr Ivanovsky, based on Mikhail Saltykov-Shchedrin's novel The Golovlyov Family.

== Plot ==
House of Greed (1933)

Porfiriy Golovlyov, nicknamed Iudushka (Judas) for hypocrisy, becomes the heir to a rich estate. But wealth does not bring happiness to him or his family. A son and nieces of Iudushka die in poverty and humiliation, without waiting for help from a rich relative.

== Cast ==
- Vladimir Gardin as Porfiriy Golovlyov
- Tatyana Bulakh-Gardina as Annenka
- Nina Latonina as Lyubinka
- Yekaterina Korchagina-Aleksandrovskaya as Ulita
- Mikhail Tarkhanov as Derunov
- Irina Zarubina as Evprakseya
- Vladimir Taskin as Petenka
- Pavel Bogdanov as Kukishev
- Vera Streshnyova as Galkina
- Nadezhda Skarskaya as Grandmother
