= Good name =

Good name may refer to:

- Good name, an alternative term for a person's given name in South Asia
- Good Name, a film directed by Evgeniy Sivokon
- Good Name, an album by William Onyeabor
- "A Good Name", an episode of the television series The Scarlet Pimpernel
- "A Good Name", a song by Shad from the album TSOL
