= Zvezda (magazine) =

Russian literary magazine

Zvezda Звезда
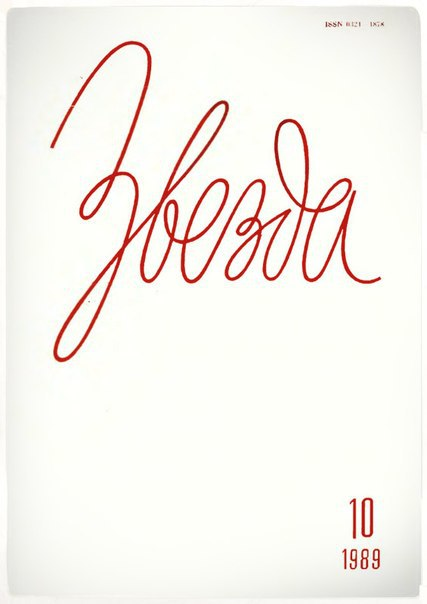
- Editors-in-chief: Yakov Gordin and Andrei Aryev
- Categories: Literary magazine
- Frequency: Monthly
- Founded: 1924; 102 years ago
- Country: Soviet Union, Russia
- Language: Russian
- Website: zvezdaspb.ru
- ISSN: 0321-1878
- OCLC: 243460261

Zvezda (Russian: Звезда, lit. 'Star') is a monthly Russian thick journal published since January 1924 in Saint Petersburg (renamed Leningrad that same month). It was the city's first literary magazine, and has published short stories, poetry, criticism, and some novels. According to the magazine's editor, Andrey Aryev, by 2015 the magazine had published over 20,000 works by over 10,000 separate authors in nearly a century of existence.

== History ==
The first issue of Zvezda appeared in January 1924, with Ivan Maisky as editor-in-chief. It published on a bimonthly basis for its first three years, before switching to its current monthly format. From 1934–1991, it was an organ of the Union of Soviet Writers.

Katerina Clark writes, in a discussion of the new journals founded at this time:

Unlike Moscow, Petrograd was given only one "thick" journal, the Star (Zvezda), which was less important and had a smaller circulation than its Moscow counterparts, which were thus able to lure away the more successful or acceptable Petrograd writers.... [Zvezda] functioned as a medium through which fringe figures on the left (proletarian extremists) and the right (such as Pilnyak, Pasternak, and Mandelshtam) could publish. While this situation afforded Petrograd the role of the more honorable, less compromised city, to some it seemed the town of the has-beens.

Aside from the authors mentioned by Clark, in its early years Zvezda published Maxim Gorky, Nikolay Zabolotsky, Mikhail Zoshchenko, Veniamin Kaverin, Nikolai Klyuev, Boris Lavrenyov, Konstantin Fedin, Vladislav Khodasevich, and Yury Tynyanov, among others.

It survived the difficult circumstances of the Siege of Leningrad, and after the war published works by such writers as Vera Panova, Daniil Granin, Vsevolod Kochetov, and Yury German. However, it was severely criticized during the Zhdanovschina cultural attacks of 1946, especially for publishing Mikhail Zoshchenko and Anna Akhmatova. In 1946, the Politburo issued a resolution that said the magazine had "many unprincipled, ideologically harmful works." According to the document, Zoshchenko "had long ago specialized in writing empty, vacuous and poshlyy things promoting a decadent lack of conviction, poshlost and apoliticism, whose aim is to misguide our youth and poison their minds." It also said Akhmatova's work "was a typical representation of empty unprincipled poetry, which is foreign to our people" and her poetry "does harm to the upbringing of our youth and cannot be tolerated in Soviet literature." In the April 1946 meeting of the Politburo, Joseph Stalin said Zvezda was the USSR's second-worst literary magazine, surpassed only by Novy Mir. A new editorial team was installed in 1947 to rectify this issue.

Towards the end of the Perestroika period, in 1988, Pravda, the official newspaper of the Communist Party of the Soviet Union, said that the 1946 resolution condemning Zvezda was "mistaken" and "a distortion of Lenin's principles regarding work and the artistic intelligentsia."

Today the magazine is collectively owned by its editorial staff. Its regular sections are "Russia and the Caucasus", "Philosophical commentary", "Memoirs of the 20th century", "People and fate", and "Prose and verse". Once a year it publishes a special issue dedicated to a prominent author or phenomenon. The magazine regularly hosts national and international conferences on its premises, as well as literature evenings, meetings with famous political and artistic figures, and art shows.

In 2015, the magazine was on the verge of insolvency and did a crowdfunding campaign on the Planeta.ru platform in order to survive.

== Editors-in-chief ==
- 1924 – Ivan Maisky
- 1925–1926 – Georgy Gorbachev
- 1926–1928 – Petr Petrovsky
- 1929–1937 – Yury Libedinsky
- 1939–1940 – Georgy Kholopov
- 1945–1946 – Vissarion Sayanov
- 1946–1947 – Aleksandr Egolin
- 1947–1957 – Valery Druzin
- 1957–1989 – Georgy Kholopov
- 1989–1991 – Gennady Nikolaev
- 1992– – Yakov Gordin and Andrey Aryev

== Circulation ==
- 1927 – 5,000
- 1954 – 60,000
- 1975–1983 – about 115,000
- 1987 – 140,000
- 1989 – 190,000
- 1990 – 344,000
- 1991 – 141,000
- 2005 – 4,300
- 2006 – 3,400

== See also ==
- List of literary magazines
- Anti-cosmopolitan campaign
