= Kryvenko =

Kryvenko (Ukrainian: Кривенко), or Krivenko, is a Ukrainian surname. Notable people with the surname include:

- Sergey Krivenko (1847–1906), Russian journalist, publicist, and editor
- Viktor Kryvenko (born 1982), Ukrainian politician
