= Yevhen Syvokin =

Ukrainian film director (1937–2026)

- Євген Сивокінь
- Born: 7 May 1937; Kyiv, Ukrainian SSR, Soviet Union
- Died: 5 May 2026 (aged 88); Kyiv, Ukraine
- Occupation: Director

Yevhen Yakovych Syvokin (Ukrainian: Євген Якович Сивокінь; 7 May 1937 – 5 May 2026) was a Soviet and Ukrainian director of animated films. He won numerous Soviet, Ukrainian and international festivals.

As of 2007, almost all Ukrainian animation was created by students of his.

He was the author If You Love Animation (1985).

Syvokin died on 5 May 2026, at the age of 88.

== Filmography ==
=== Director ===
- 1966: Fragments
- 1968: The Man Who Could Fly
- 1970: The Tale of Good Rhino
- 1971: Good Name
- 1971: From Start to Finish
- 1973: Fraction
- 1973: The Man and the Word
- 1974: The Tale of the White Icicles
- 1975: Beware – The Nerves!
- 1976: Door
- 1977: The Adventures Vakula
- 1979: Sloth
- 1979: Reshuffle
- 1980: The Secret Love Potion
- 1981: Unlucky Star
- 1982: Country Schitaliya
- 1983: Wood and Cat
- 1984: Glance
- 1985: An Unwritten
- 1987: Window
- 1989: Why Is Uncle Jack Limps
- 1992: Dream Svitla
- 1999: Yak metelik vivchav Zhittya
- 1999: Yak at nashogo Omelechka nevelichka simeєchka
- 2002: Kompromiks
- 2005: Snowy Roads...
- 2008: Vryatyy i zberezhi
- 2017: Chronicles of a City (based on Mikhail Saltykov-Shchedrin's The History of a Town)

=== Animator ===
- 1998: Father
