= Modern Idyll =

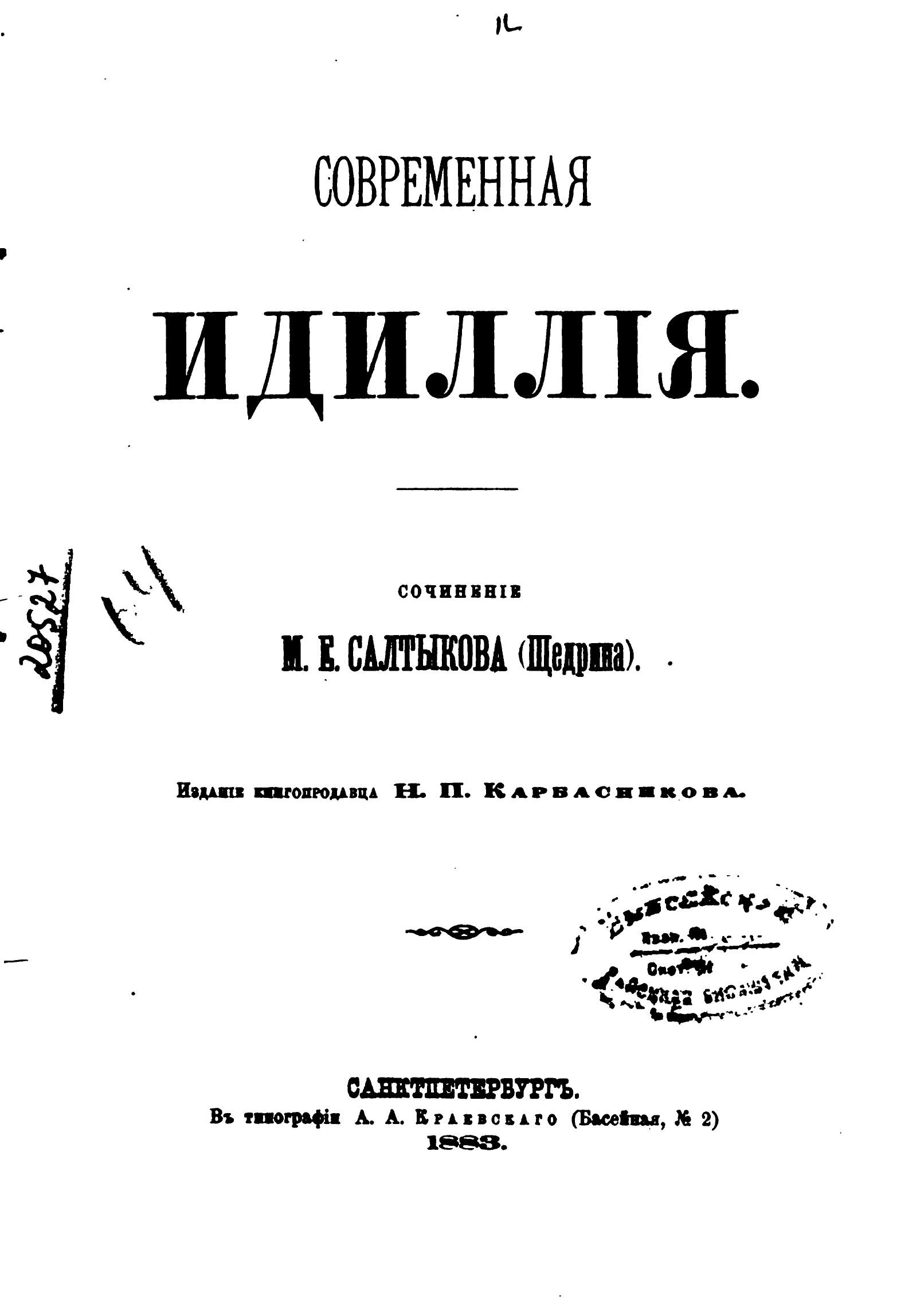
- Author: Mikhail Saltykov-Shchedrin
- Original title: Современная идиллия
- Language: Russian
- Genre: Political satire, picaresque novel, menippean satire
- Publisher: Otechestvennye Zapiski
- Publication date: 1883
- Publication place: Russian Empire

Modern Idyll (Russian: Современная идиллия, romanized: Sovremennaya idilliya, also mentioned as Contemporary Idyll) is a satirical novel (viewed alternatively as a thematically linked short story collection) by Mikhail Saltykov-Shchedrin, started in 1877 and originally serialized by Otechestvennye Zapiski magazine. It came out as a separate edition in 1883 to great public and critical acclaim.
