= Fyodor Sologub =

Russian symbolist writer (1863–1927)

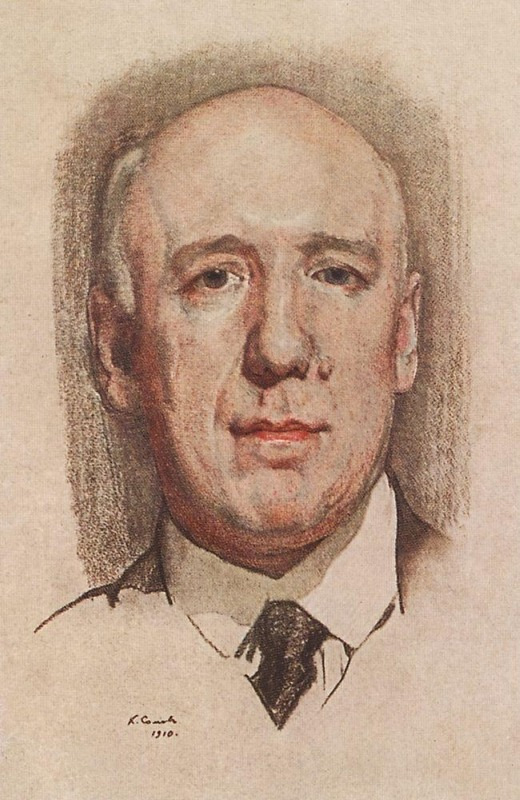
- Sologub in 1910
- Born: Fyodor Kuzmich Teternikov; 1 March [O.S. 17 February] 1863; Saint Petersburg, Russian Empire
- Died: 5 December 1927 (aged 64); Leningrad, Russian SFSR, Soviet Union
- Occupations: Poet, novelist, short story writer, playwright, essayist
- Writing career
- Notable work: The Petty Demon
- Movement: Russian Symbolism

Fyodor Sologub (Russian: Фёдор Сологу́б), born Fyodor Kuzmich Teternikov (Russian: Фёдор Кузьми́ч Тете́рников; 1 March [O.S. 17 February] 1863 – 5 December 1927), also known as Theodor Sologub, was a Russian Symbolist poet, novelist, translator, playwright and essayist. He was the first writer to introduce the morbid, pessimistic elements characteristic of European fin de siècle literature and philosophy into Russian prose.

== Early life ==
Fyodor Sologub was born in St. Petersburg into the family of a poor tailor, Kuzma Afanasyevich Teternikov, who had been a serf in Poltava Governorate, the illegitimate son of a local landowner. When his father died of tuberculosis in 1867, his illiterate mother, Tatiana Semyonovna Teternikova, was forced to become a servant in the home of the aristocratic Agapov family, where Sologub and his younger sister Olga grew up. The family took an interest in the education of young Fyodor, sending him to a pedagogical institution where Sologub was a model student. Seeing how difficult his mother's life was, Sologub was determined to rescue her from it, and after graduating from the St. Petersburg Teachers' Institute in 1882, he took his mother and sister with him to his first teaching post in Kresttsy, where he began his literary career with the 1884 publication in a children's magazine of his poem "The Fox and the Hedgehog" under the name Te-rnikov.

Sologub continued writing as he relocated to new jobs in Velikiye Luki (1885) and Vytegra (1889), but felt that he was completely isolated from the literary world and longed to be able to live in the capital again; nevertheless, his decade-long experience with the "frightful world" of backwoods provincial life served him well when he came to write The Petty Demon. He said later that in writing the novel he had softened the facts: "things happened that no one would believe if I were to describe them." He felt sympathetic toward the writers associated with the journal Severnyi vestnik ("Northern Herald"), including Nikolai Minsky, Zinaida Gippius, and Dmitry Merezhkovsky, who were beginning to create what would be known as the Symbolist movement, and in 1891 he visited Petersburg hoping to see Minsky and Merezhkovsky, but met only the first.

== Early literary career ==
In 1892, he was finally able to relocate to the capital, where he got a job teaching mathematics, started writing what would become his most famous novel, The Petty Demon, and began frequenting the offices of Severny Vestnik, which published much of his writing during the next five years. There, in 1893, Minsky, who thought Teternikov was an unpoetic name, suggested that he use a pseudonym, and the aristocratic name Sollogub was decided on, but one of the l's was omitted as an attempt (unavailing, as it turned out) to avoid confusion with Count Vladimir Sollogub. In 1894, his first short story, "Ninochkina oshibka" ("Ninochka's Mistake"), was published in Illustrirovanny Mir, and in the autumn of that year, his mother died. In 1896, he published his first three books: a book of poems, a collection of short stories, and his first novel, Tyazhelye sny ("Bad Dreams"), which he had begun in 1883 and which is considered one of the first decadent Russian novels.

In April 1897, he ended his association with Severny Vestnik and, along with Merezhkovsky and Gippius, began writing for the journal Sever ("North"). The next year, his first series of fairy tales was published. In 1899, he was appointed principal of the Andreevskoe municipal school and relocated to their premises on Vasilievsky Island; he also became a member of the St. Petersburg District School Council. He continued to publish books of poetry, and in 1902, he finished The Petty Demon, which was published partially in serial form in 1905 (in Voprosy zhizni, which was terminated before the final instalments). At this time, his "Sundays", a literary group that met at his home, attracted poets, artists, and actors, including Alexander Blok, Mikhail Kuzmin, Alexei Remizov, Sergei Gorodetsky, Vyacheslav Ivanov, Léon Bakst, Mstislav Dobuzhinsky and Sergei Auslender. Teffi wrote of him at this period:

His face was pale, long, without eyebrows; by his nose was a large wart; a thin reddish beard seemed to pull away from his thin cheeks; dull, half-closed eyes. His face was always tired, always bored... Sometimes when he was a guest at someone's table he would close his eyes and remain like that for several minutes, as if he had forgotten to open them.

He never laughed... Sologub lived on Vasilievsky Island in the small official apartment of a municipal school where he was a teacher and inspector. He lived with his sister, a flat-chested, consumptive old maid. She was quiet and shy; she adored her brother and was a little afraid of him, and spoke of him only in a whisper. He said in a poem: "We were holiday children, My sister and I"; they were very poor, those holiday children, dreaming that someone would give them "even motley-colored shells from a brook." Sadly and dully they dragged out the difficult days of their youth. The consumptive sister, not having received her share of motley shells, was already burning out. He himself was exhausted by his boring teaching job; he wrote in snatches by night, always tired from the boyish noise of his students...

So Sologub lived in his little official apartment with little icon lamps, serving his guests mint cakes, ruddy rolls, pastila, and honey cakes, for which his sister went across the river somewhere on a horsecar. She told us privately, "I'd love to ride on the outside of the horsecar sometime, but my brother won't let me. He says it's unseemly for a lady."... Those evenings in the little apartment, when his close literary friends gathered, were very interesting.

== Fame and marriage ==
At the time of the 1905 Revolution, his politically critical skazochki ("little tales") were very popular and were collected into a book, Politicheskie skazochki (1906). The Petty Demon was published in a standalone edition in 1907 and quickly became popular, having ten printings during the author's lifetime. Sologub's next major prose work, A Created Legend (1905–1913), literally "the legend in the making," a trilogy consisting of Drops of Blood, Queen Ortruda, and Smoke and Ash, had many of the same characteristics, but presented a considerably more positive and hopeful description of the world. "It begins with the famous declaration that although life is 'vulgar... stagnant in darkness, dull and ordinary,' the poet 'creates from it a sweet legend... my legend of the enchanting and beautiful.'"

His increasing literary success was tempered for him by his sister's tuberculosis; in 1906, he traveled with her to Ufa Governorate for treatment, and in June 1907, he took her to Finland, where she died on 28 June. The next month, he returned to St. Petersburg and retired after 25 years of teaching. In the autumn of 1908, he married the translator Anastasia Chebotarevskaya (born in 1876), whom he had met at Vyacheslav Ivanov's apartment three years before. Teffi wrote that she "reshaped his daily life in a new and unnecessary way. A big new apartment was rented, small gilt chairs were bought. The walls of the large cold office for some reason were decorated with paintings of Leda by various painters... The quiet talks were replaced by noisy gatherings with dances and masks. Sologub shaved his mustache and beard, and everyone started to say that he resembled a Roman of the period of decline." He continued publishing poems, plays, and translations; the next year he traveled abroad for the first time, visiting France with his wife, and in September the dramatized version of The Petty Demon was published.

Between 1909 and 1911, The Complete Works of Fyodor Sologub were published in 12 volumes, and in 1911, a collection of critical works appeared, containing over 30 critical essays, notes, and reviews by famous writers. In 1913, he presented a lecture, "The Art Of These Days," that was so successful in St. Petersburg he took it on tour all over Russia. In 1914, he started a magazine, Dnevniki pisatelei ("Writers' Journals"), and went abroad with his wife, but the outbreak of World War I put an end to the magazine. In 1915 two collections of his stories and tales were published in English, and in 1916, The Petty Demon, all translated by John Cournos.

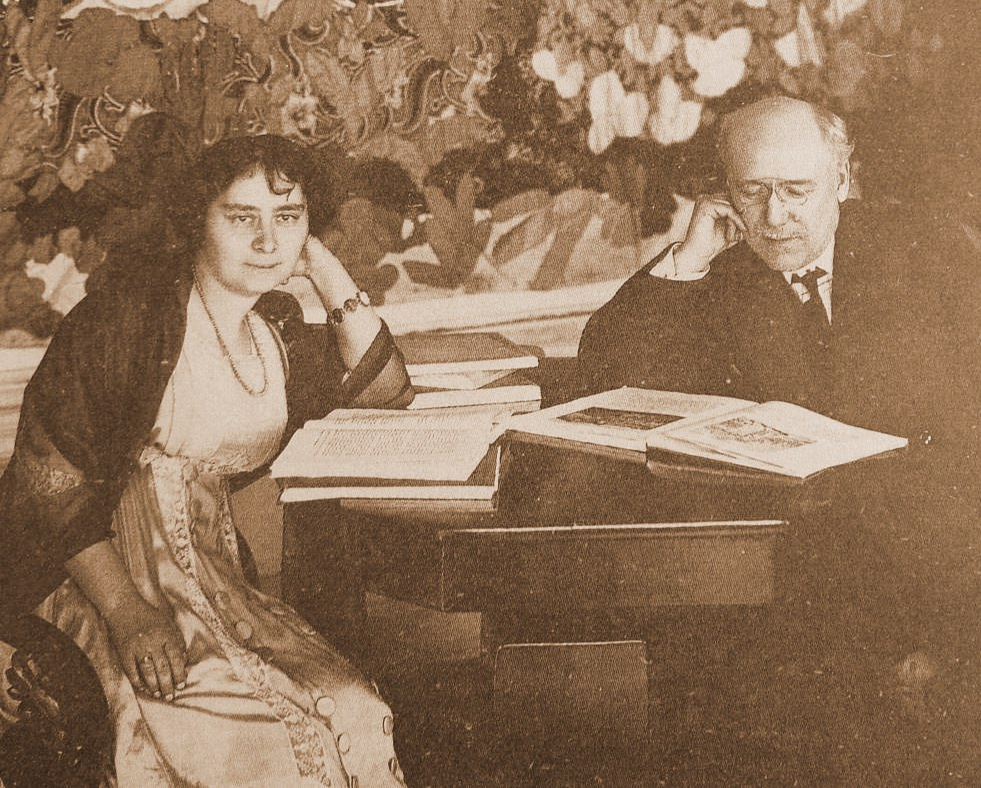
Fyodor Sologub & Anastasia Chebotarevskaya (1914)

Sologub continued touring and giving lectures, and in 1917 he welcomed the February Revolution. During the summer he headed the Soyuz Deyatelei Iskusstva ("Union of Artists") and wrote articles with a strong anti-Bolshevik attitude. He was opposed to the October Revolution, but remained in Petrograd and contributed to independent newspapers until they were terminated. In 1918 he spoke on behalf of the Union Of Artists; published Slepaia babochka ("The Blind Butterfly"), a collection of new short stories; had a play produced in Yalta; and joined the Petersburg Union of Journalists. But by the end of the year, because of Bolshevik control of publishing and bookselling, he did not have any outlets for his writing. Lev Kleinbort wrote of that period: "Sologub did not give lectures, but lived by selling his things."

Even though he was in principle opposed to emigration, the desperate condition in which he and his wife found himself caused him to apply in December 1919 for permission to leave the country; he did not receive any response. Half a year later, he wrote to Lenin personally, again without result. In mid-July 1921, he finally received a letter from Leon Trotsky authorizing his departure, and he made plans to leave for Reval on 25 September. But on the evening of 23 September, his wife, weakened by privation and driven to despair by the long torment of uncertainty, threw herself off the Tuchkov Bridge and drowned. His wife's death grieved Sologub for the rest of his life, and he referenced it often in his subsequent writing. A poem dated 28 November 1921, begins "You took away my soul / to the bottom of the river. / I will defy your wishes / and follow you." He gave up any thought of leaving Russia and relocated into an apartment on the banks of the Zhdanovka River, in which his wife had drowned.

In 1921, the New Economic Policy was begun, and from the end of the year, his books, which had been published abroad with increasing frequency, notably in Germany and Estonia, began to appear in Soviet Russia. In December, Fimiamy ("Incense"), a collection of poems, was published; the next two years more poetry collections and translations were published (Balzac's Contes drolatiques, Paul Verlaine, Heinrich von Kleist, Frédéric Mistral), and in 1924, the 40th anniversary of Sologub's literary activities was celebrated at the Alexandrinsky Theater in St. Petersburg, with speeches by Yevgeny Zamyatin, Mikhail Kuzmin, Andrei Bely, and Osip Mandelstam, among others. In April of that year, he was elected the honorary chairman of the Division of Translators in the St. Petersburg Union Of Writers, and two years later, he became the chairman of the board of the Union. He had literary gatherings in his apartment, attended by such writers as Anna Akhmatova and Korney Chukovsky. His new poems, which had a classic simplicity, were appreciated by those to whom he read them, but they were not printed anymore.

== Death and legacy ==
In May 1927, Sologub became seriously ill, and by summer he could leave his bed only rarely; his last poem was dated 1 October. After a long struggle, he died on 5 December in Leningrad. Two days later, he was buried next to his wife in Smolensk Cemetery.

While Sologub's novels have become his best-known works, he has always been respected by scholars and fellow authors for his poetry.

The Symbolist poet Valery Bryusov admired the deceptive simplicity of Sologub's poetry and described it as possessing a Pushkinian perfection of form. Innokenty Annensky, another poet and contemporary of Sologub, wrote that the most original aspect of Sologub's poetry was its author's unwillingness to separate himself from his literature.

== The Petty Demon ==
The Petty Demon attempted to create a description of poshlost', a Russian concept that has characteristics of both evil and banality. The antihero is a provincial schoolteacher, Peredonov, notable for his complete lack of redeeming human qualities. The novel recounts the story of the morally corrupt Peredonov going insane and paranoid in an unnamed Russian provincial town, parallel with his struggle to be promoted to governmental inspector of his province. The omniscient third-person narrative allowed Sologub to combine his Symbolist tendencies and the tradition of Russian Realism in which he engaged throughout his earlier novels, a style similar to Maupassant's fantastic realism.

Realistic elements of The Petty Demon include a vivid description of 19th-century rural everyday life, while a fantastic element is the presentation of Peredonov's hallucinations on equal terms with external events. While the book was received as an indictment of Russian society, it is a very metaphysical novel and one of the major prose works of the Russian Symbolist movement. James H. Billington said of it:

The book puts on display a Freudian treasure chest of perversions with subtlety and credibility. The name of the novel's hero, Peredonov, became a symbol of calculating concupiscence for an entire generation... He torments his students, derives erotic satisfaction from watching them kneel to pray, and systematically befouls his apartment before leaving it as part of his generalized spite against the universe.

== Works ==
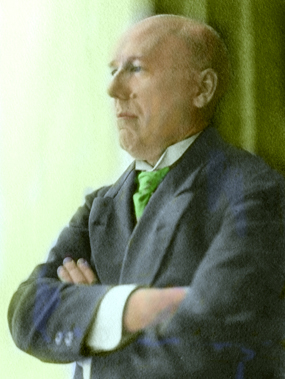
Sologub in 1913

=== Novels ===
- Bad Dreams [Tyazhelye Sny] (1896)
- The Petty Demon also The Little Demon
- The Created Legend
  - Drops of Blood
  - Queen Ortruda
  - Smoke and Ash

=== Short stories ===
- Light and Shadows
- Beauty
- In the Crowd
- The Glimmer of Hunger
- The White Dog
- Hide and Seek
- The Cave
- The Old House
- The Uniter of Souls
- The Invoker of the Beast
- The Smile
- The Hoop
- The Search
- The White Mother

=== Collections ===
- The Sweet-Scented Name and Other Stories (1915)

=== Plays ===
- The Triumph of Death
- The Petty Demon (1909)

=== English translations ===
- The Sweet-Scented Name, and Other Fairy Tales, Fables and Stories trans. Stephen Graham (New York: G.P. Putnam's Sons, 1915).
- The Old House, and Other Tales trans. John Cournos (London: M. Secker [1915]) (contains: “The Old House,” “The Uniter of Souls,” “The Invoker of the Beast,” “The White Dog,” “Light and Shadows,” “The Glimmer of Hunger,” “Hide and Seek,” “The Smile,” “The Hoop,” “The Search,” “The White Mother”). Reprinted: Westport, Conn.: Greenwood Press [1974]. ISBN 0837177154.
- The Little Demon authorized trans. John Cournos and Richard Aldington (London: M. Secker, 1916).
- The Created Legend authorized trans. John Cournos (London: M. Secker, 1916). (This translation only contains the first novel, Drops of Blood, of the trilogy.)
- "Hide and Seek" in Best Russian Short Stories comp. and trans. Thomas Seltzer (New York: Boni & Liveright, Inc. 1917).
- "The Fatherland for All" in The Shield ed. Maxim Gorky, Leonid Andreyev and Fyodor Sologub; trans. Avrahm Yarmolinsky (New York: A.A. Knopf, 1917).
- "The White Dog" in Russian Classics (Boston: The Four Seas Co., 1918) (International Pocket Library).
- "The Rainment of the Lily and the Clothing of the Cabbage" and "The merry dead man" in Judas Iscariot, and Other Stories ([New York]: Guido Bruno, 1919 [c1916]).
- "In Bondage" in Russian stories = Russkie rasskazy ed. Gleb Struve (New York: Bantam Books, 1961) (Bantam Dual Language Edition).
- The Petty Demon trans. Andrew Field (New York: Random House, [1962]).
- "A Little Man" in A Bilingual Collection of Russian Short Stories ed. Maurice Friedberg (New York: Random House, 1964).
- Melkiĭ bes = Shabby Demon (Letchworth [Herts.]: Bradda Books, 1966).
- "My Grim Genius," "Our Resurrection," "We Can Die Together" and "Song" in Russian Poetry under the Tsars: An Anthology comp. and trans. Burton Raffel (Albany: State University of New York Press, 1971). ISBN 9780873950701.
- "The Poison Garden" in The Silver Age of Russian Culture: An Anthology ed. edited Carl Proffer and Ellendea Proffer (Ann Arbor: Ardis, 1975). ISBN 9780882331713.
- The Kiss of the Unborn, and Other Stories trans. Murl G. Barker (Knoxville: University of Tennessee Press, c1977) (contains: "The Wall and the Shadows," "The Worm," "The Hoop," "Hide-and-Seek," "Beauty," "The Beloved Page," "The Youth Linus," "Death by Advertisement," "In the Crowd," "The Queen of Kisses," "The Search," "The Red-Lipped Guest," "The Kiss of the Unborn," "The Lady in Bonds," "She Wore a Crown"). ISBN 0870492020.
- Bad Dreams trans. Vassar W. Smith (Ann Arbor: Ardis, c1978). ISBN 0882331280.
- Drops of Blood trans. Samuel D. Cioran (Ann Arbor: Ardis, c1979). ISBN 0882331302.
- Queen Ortruda trans. Samuel D. Cioran (Ann Arbor: Ardis, c1979). ISBN 0882331426.
- Smoke and Ashes trans. Samuel D. Cioran (Ann Arbor: Ardis, c1979). ISBN 0882331442.
- The Created Legend trans. Samuel D. Cioran (Ann Arbor: Ardis, c1979). ISBN 0882331302.
- The Petty Demon trans. Samuel D. Cioran (Ann Arbor: Ardis, c1983) (with an appendix and critical articles ed. Murl Barker). ISBN 0882338072.
- "Vanka the Steward and Jehan the Page" in The Unknown Russian Theater: An Anthology ed. and trans. Michael Green and Jerome Katsell (Ann Arbor: Ardis, c1991). ISBN 9780882335544.
- The Little Demon trans. Ronald Wilk (New York: Penguin, c1994) (Penguin Twentieth Century Classics). ISBN 9781480625570.
- Consolation, A Story; Selected Verse bilingual ed. English trans. Vassar W. Smith (s.l.: Barbary Coast Books, 1997). ISBN 9780936041100.
- "The Asteroid" and "A Little Man" in Worlds Apart: An Antholgy [sic] of Russian Fantasy and Science Fiction trans. Alexander Levitsky and Martha T. Kitchen (New York: Overlook Duckworth, 2007). ISBN 9781585678198.
- "The Invoker of the Beast" in 50 Writers: An Anthology of 20th Century Russian Short Stories trans. Valentina Brougher and Frank Miller, with Mark Lipovetsky (Boston: Academic Studies Press, 2011). ISBN 9781936235148.
