= Otechestvennye Zapiski =

Russian literary magazine (1856–1906)

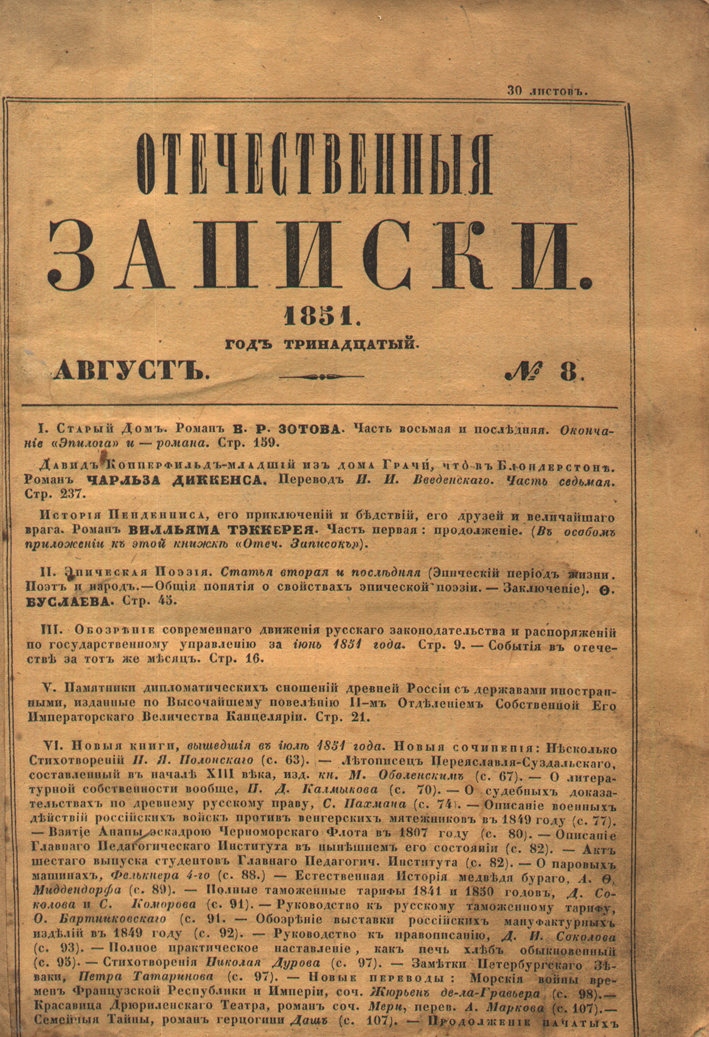
- An issue from 1851
- Editor: Pavel Svinyin, Andrey Krayevsky, Nikolai Nekrasov, Mikhail Saltykov-Shchedrin
- Frequency: Monthly
- Founded: 1818
- Final issue: 1884
- Country: Russia
- Based in: St. Petersburg
- Language: Russian

Otechestvennye Zapiski (Russian: Отечественные записки, IPA: [ɐˈtʲetɕɪstvʲɪnːɨjɪ zɐˈpʲiskʲɪ], variously translated as "Annals of the Fatherland", "Patriotic Notes", "Notes of the Fatherland", etc.) was a Russian literary magazine published in Saint Petersburg on a monthly basis between 1818 and 1884. The journal served liberal-minded readers known as the intelligentsia. Such major novels as Ivan Goncharov's Oblomov (1859), Fyodor Dostoyevsky's The Double (1846) and The Adolescent (1875) and Mikhail Saltykov-Shchedrin's The Golovlyov Family (1880) made their first appearance in Otechestvennye Zapiski.

Founded by Pavel Svinyin in 1818, the journal was published irregularly until 1820. It was closed down in 1830 but resurfaced several years later, with Andrey Krayevsky as its publisher. The renovated magazine regularly published articles by Vissarion Belinsky and Alexander Herzen, catering to well-educated liberals. Other notable contributors included:

- Mikhail Bakunin
- Timofey Granovsky
- Nikolay Nekrasov
- Ivan Turgenev
- Vladimir Dahl
- Vladimir Odoyevsky
- Aleksey Pisemsky
- Afanasy Fet

In 1846 Nekrasov persuaded Belinsky and other contributors to leave Otechestvennye Zapiski for his own Sovremennik. As a result, the former declined in circulation and influence. It was overshadowed by the more radical Sovremennik for 20 years, until the latter was banned in 1866.

In 1868 Nekrasov acquired Otechestvennye Zapiski from Krayevsky and started editing it jointly with Saltykov-Shchedrin. After Nekrasov's death Saltykov-Schedrin was its sole editor-in-chief, radicalizing the journal even further. In the 1870s it was transformed into a mouthpiece of the Narodnik movement.

Despite Saltykov's mastery of "Aesopian" language, the tsarist authorities closed Otechestvennye zapiski in 1884 as "an organ of the press which not only opens its pages to the spread of dangerous ideas, but even has as its closest collaborators people who belong to secret societies".

== Featured titles ==
- Fyodor Dostoyevsky
  - The Double (1846)
  - White Nights (1848)
  - Netochka Nezvanova (1849)
  - The Village of Stepanchikovo (1859)
  - The Adolescent (1875)
- Ivan Goncharov
  - Frigate "Pallada" (1858)
  - Oblomov (1859)
- Nikolai Leskov
  - Musk-ox (1863)
  - The Amazon (1866)
- Nikolai Nekrasov
  - Russian Women (1872–1873)
  - Who Is Happy in Russia? (1863–1876)
- Leo Tolstoy
  - A Morning of a Landed Proprietor (1852)
- Mikhail Saltykov-Shchedrin
  - The History of a Town (1870)
  - The Golovlyov Family (1880)
  - Modern Idyll (1883)
  - Fables (1869–1886)
