= The History of a Town =

1870 novel by Mikhail Saltykov-Shchedrin

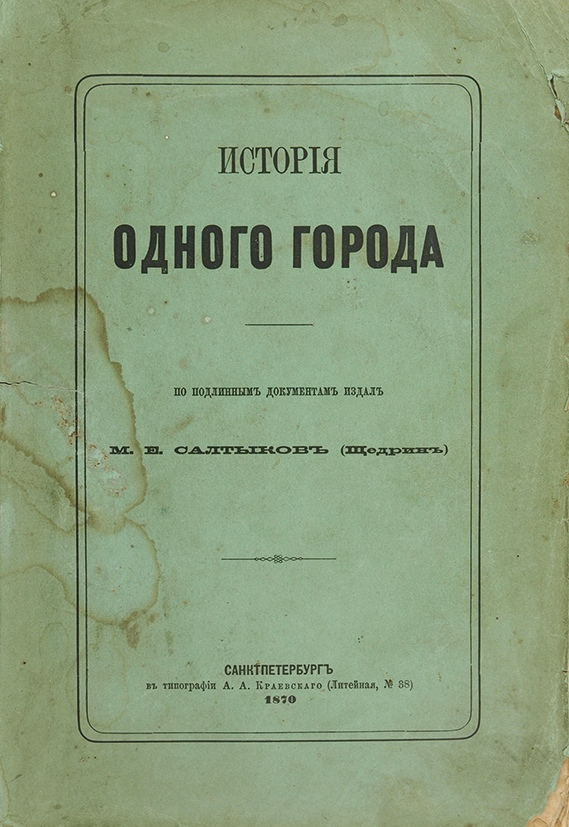
- First edition
- Author: Mikhail Saltykov-Shchedrin
- Original title: Исторiя одного города
- Language: Russian
- Genre: Satirical novel, political novel
- Publisher: Otechestvennye Zapiski
- Publication date: 1870
- Publication place: Russia

The History of a Town (Russian: История одного города, romanized: Istoriya odnogo goroda; pre-reform spelling: Исторiя одного города), also translated as Foolsburg: The History of a Town, is an 1870 novel by Mikhail Saltykov-Shchedrin. The plot presents the history of the town of Glupov, which may be translated as the "town of fools", a grotesque microcosm of the Russian Empire. Written during the period of the "Great Reforms" in 19th-century Russia, it was neglected for a long time and rediscovered only in the 20th century. It is regarded by critics as the author's masterpiece and sometimes even compared to Gabriel García Márquez's One Hundred Years of Solitude.

== Background ==
In the 1867-1868 Saltykov-Shchedrin stopped working on his cycle of satirical sketches The Pompadours and started writing the novel, seeing it a kind of a spin-off for the cycle. In January 1869, the two first chapters appeared in the Otechestvennye Zapiski magazine. A pause followed and lasted till the end of the year: the author wrote and published several satirical fairytales (such as "The Story of How a Muzhik Fed Two Generals") and satirical sketches. The rest of the novel was published in issues in 1870. The last chapter of the novel, which describes the rule of Ugryum-Burcheev, was written under the impressions of the murder of Ivan Ivanov by the socialist revolutionary group "People's Vengeance", later described by Karl Marx as "barracks communist".

== Plot ==
The novel presents a fictional chronicle (letopis) of a provincial Russian town of Glupov (the name can be translated as Foolsville, Foolov, or Stupidtown), which depicts Glupov and its governors from its foundation by the tribe of Headbeaters to its end in 1825. Among the governors of Glupov are Dementy Brudasty, nicknamed The Music Box for a mechanical device in his head, designed to replace a human brain; Vasilisk Borodavkin, who wages 'the wars of enlightenment' against the Glupovites; Erast Grustilov, a friend of the Russian sentimentalist author and high-ranking official Nikolai Karamzin. All of them are trying to bring prosperity to Glupov or to keep their status by ruling the town in their own ways, mostly with ruthless violence. The last governor of Glupov is Ugryum-Burcheev, who rebuilds the town into a totalitarian state according the administrative ideal of the Russian Empire and to his utopia of a 'straight line', intended to make everyone equal in subordinacy to him as a godlike leader. His rule results with the coming of "It", which destroys Glupov, making the history "to cease its course".

== Reception and significance ==
There is something of Swift in Saltyko[v]; that serious and grim comedy, that realism — prosaic in its lucidity amidst the wildest play of fancy — and, above all, that constant good sense — I may even say that moderation — kept up in spite of so much violence and exaggeration of form. I have seen audiences thrown into convulsions of laughter by the recital of some of Saltyko[v]’s sketches. There was something almost terrible in that laughter, the public, even while laughing, feeling itself under the lash. I repeat that the History of a Town could not be translated as it stands, but I think that a selection might be made out of the different forms of its Governors which pass before the reader’s eyes, sufficient of give an idea to foreigners of the interest excited in Russia by a strange and striking book — one which, under a form necessarily allegorical, offers a picture of Russian history which is, alas! too true.

— Ivan Turgenev, The Academy, 1871

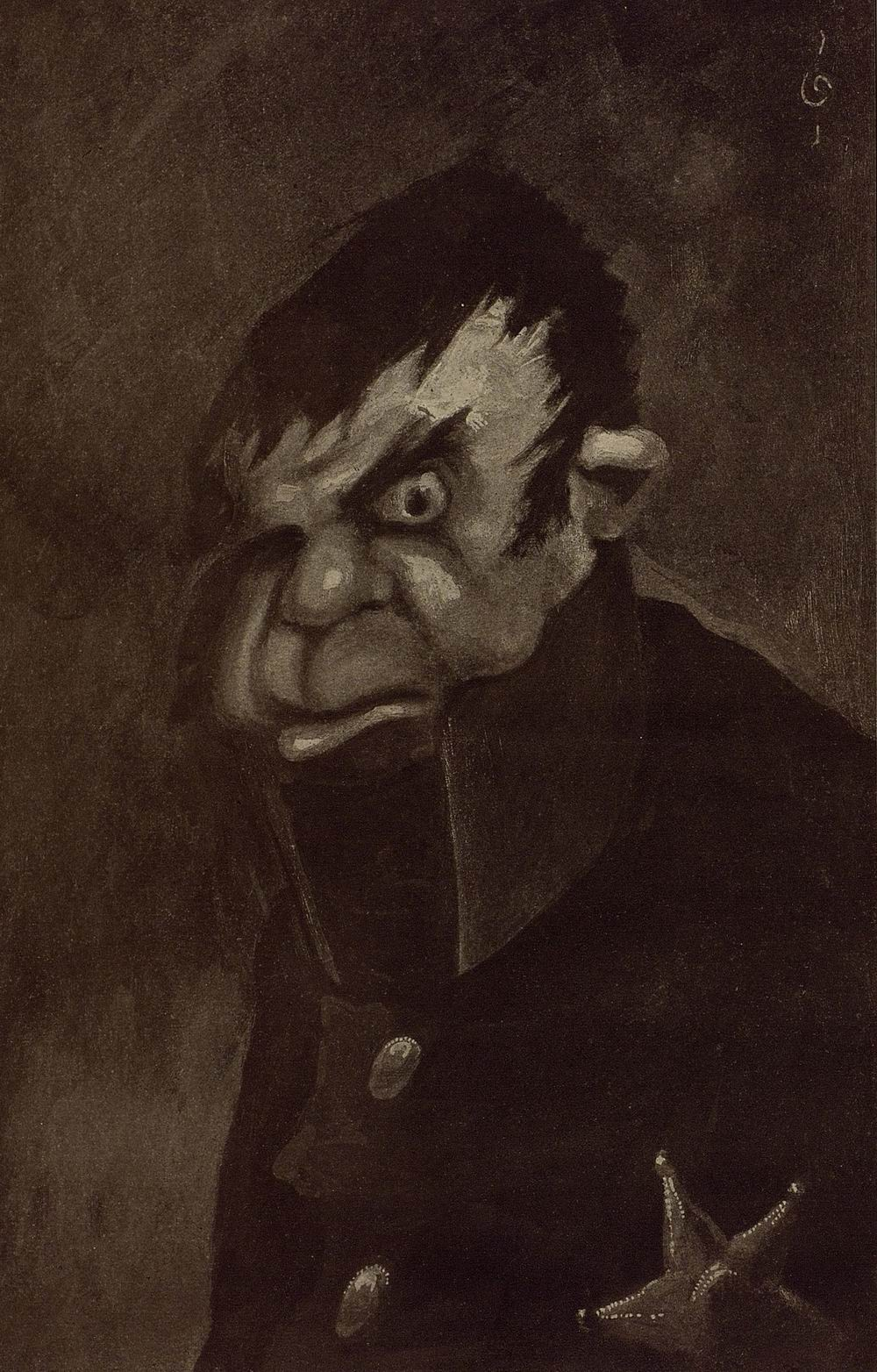
Portrait of Ugryum-Burcheev. Illustration to The History of a Town by Re-Mi (1907)

Although Turgenev received the novel well, it generated controversy shortly after its appearance, as most of the critics couldn't understand Saltykov's idea of placating the present while seeming to depict the past, and considered it as a parody of Russian history, in which the town stands for Russia, and the governors are caricatures of Russian sovereigns and their ministers. After the heated polemics and discussions on whether or not the novel was something more than just a caricature of the Russian state and the House of Romanov, or even of the Russian past, it was neglected for several decades, until it was rediscovered in the 20th century by Soviet Union, who gave an impetus to a serious study of Saltykov's work. After interest in the chronicle increased in the 20th century, it survived various interpretations, and it was later noted that Saltykov attacks the "situation" in which the helpless and passive masses obey the 'governors', the bearers of power and exclusivity; that he conveys his ideas of history and the role which the people play in it through such satirical devices as the grotesque and "laughter through tears"; that the author in his satire of Utopia in his description of Ugryum-Burcheev's rule predicted the totalitarian regimes of the 20th century and anticipated famous dystopias such as Nineteen Eighty-Four by George Orwell and We by Yevgeny Zamyatin.

== Style ==
Because of his grotesque satire and fantasy, Saltykov is often compared to Nikolai Gogol. His semantic manipulation is also similar to Gogol's. However, Saltykov is different in his 'grim single-mindedness', which is seen in crude and some times erotic (for example, the town-governesses 'ate babies, cut off women's breasts and ate them too') scenes of violence, death and "repression for repression's sake" uncharacteristic of Gogol. Virginia Llewellyn Smith notes: "Unlike Gogol, Saltykov never gives the impression that he himself scarcely distinguished fantasy from reality, and one result is that his narrative has moments of genuine pathos."

In The History of a Town, a parody of Russian chronicles, Saltykov satirizes the style of official documents and chronicles. For example, the scene of Headbeaters drowning in a bog is commented on with the phrase 'Many showed zeal for their native land.' He also conveys an impression of insecurity by shifting from one style to another: the scenes of violence are often written in the style of a realist novel, but then Saltykov reverts to 'the chronicler's unctuous tones'; harsh realism alternates with fantasy.

== Screen adaptations ==
- Organchik (1933), directed by Nikolai Khodataev.
- Ono (1989), directed by Sergei Ovcharov.
- Istoriya odnogo goroda. Organchik (1991), directed by Valentin Karavaev.
- Khroniki odnogo mista (2017), directed by Yevgen Syvokin', Ukraine.

== English translations ==
- The History of a Town, Willem A. Meeuws, Oxford, 1980. Translated by I. P. Foote ISBN 0902672398
  - The History of a Town, translated and annotated by I. P. Foote, foreword by Charlotte Hobson. Head of Zeus (Apollo Library), 2016.
- The History of a Town, or, The Chronicle of Foolov, Ardis, 1982. Translated by Susan Brownsberger. ISBN 0882336118
- Foolsburg: The History of a Town, translated by Richard Pevear and Larissa Volokhonsky. Vintage, 2024. ISBN 0593687310
