= Sergey Krivenko =

Russian journalist, publicist and editor

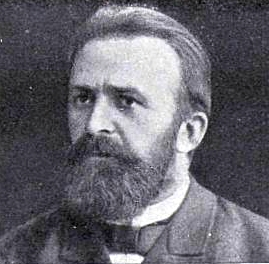
- Born: Сергей Николаевич Кривенко; 1 February 1847; Borisoglebsk, Russian Empire
- Died: 18 June 1906 (aged 59); Tuapse, Russian Empire
- Occupations: publicist, journalist, editor

Sergey Nikolayevich Krivenko (Russian: Серге́й Никола́евич Криве́нко, 1 February 1847, Borisoglebsk, Imperial Russia, — 18 June 1906, Tuapse, Imperial Russia) was a Russian journalist, publicist and editor associated with the Narodnik movement. In the 1870s and early 1880s he was one of the prominent figures in Otechestvennye Zapiski where, starting form 1881 he was the editor of the Internal Affairs review section.

In 1883 Krivenko was arrested and in 1885 deported to Western Siberia. In 1890 he returned and in 1891, alongside Konstantin Stanyukovich, started to co-edit Russkoye Bogatstvo. Later he joined the staff of Novoye Slovo magazine. He authored numerous essays on the current Russian economic affairs, some of which, concerning the development of a workers' artels, were collected and came out as a separate edition, part of The Artel Collection series.

Krivenko was noted for his satirical quips against the Russian Marxists whose vision he considered to be detrimental to the peasantry. Because the Marxists stressed the "progressive" role of capitalism in the Russian context, he suggested jokingly that they should themselves start enterprises. This led to Lenin criticizing Krivenko at length in an 1894 publication. Lenin argued that the Russian countryside was already evolving towards capitalism and that "our handicraft industries are nothing but capitalism at various stages of development", with the poorer artisans being transformed into labourers and the richer ones into capitalists.

Krivenko died in Tuapse in 1906.
