= The Golovlyov Family =

1880 novel by Mikhail Saltykov-Shchedrin

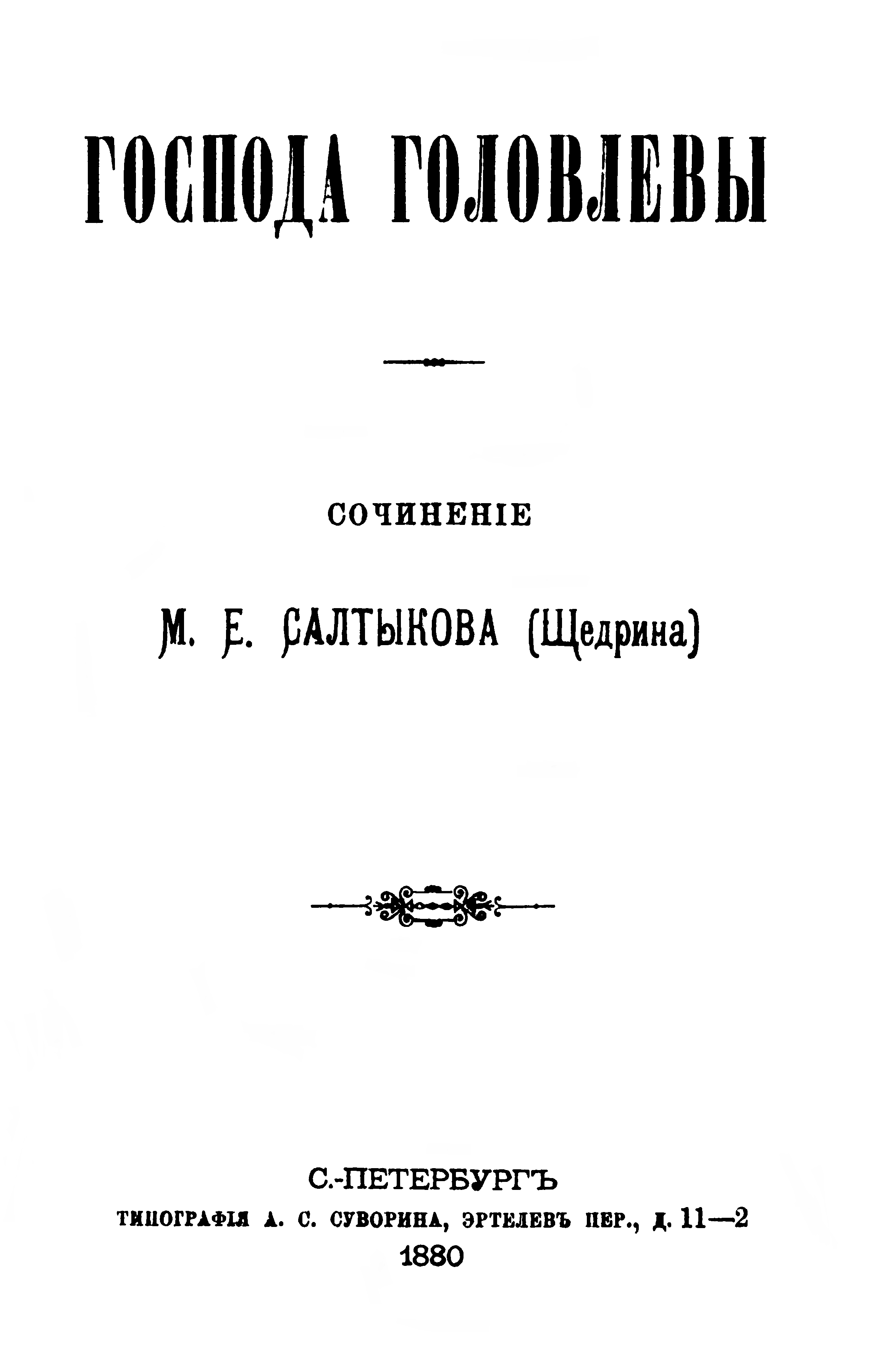
- First edition
- Author: Mikhail Saltykov-Shchedrin
- Original title: Господа Головлёвы
- Language: Russian
- Genre: Family chronicle, satirical novel
- Publisher: Otechestvennye Zapiski
- Publication date: 1875–1880
- Publication place: Russia
- English publication date: 1910

The Golovlyov Family (Russian: Господа Головлёвы, romanized: Gospoda Golovlyovy; also translated as The Golovlevs or A Family of Noblemen: The Gentlemen Golovliov) is a novel by Mikhail Saltykov-Shchedrin, written in the course of five years, first published in 1880, and generally regarded as the author's magnum opus.

The Golovlyov Family is regarded as a classic of Russian literature. According to D. S. Mirsky, it is "the gloomiest book in all Russian literature", and "this one book" places the author "in the very front line of Russian realistic novelists and secures him a permanent place among the national classics".

== Background ==
The principal characters of the novel are based on the members of Saltykov's family. Saltykov's mother is closely portrayed in Arina Petrovna, while Porphyry has many features of Saltykov's older brother Dmitry. N. Belogolovy, Saltykov's friend and doctor, described the family as "savage and ill-tempered" and relations by its members as "marked by an animal cruelty, devoid of any warm familial aspects".

In 1875 Saltykov started a series of satirical short stories The Well-Meant Speeches for the magazine Otechestvennye zapiski, which initially contained several stories about the Golovlyovs. However, the idea of a large family chronicle novel, designed to show the stagnation of the land-based gentry (dvoryanstvo), was formed only in 1876, when Saltykov stopped publishing stories about the family under the title The Well-Meant Speeches. In 1880 Shchedrin wrote the final chapter of the novel and reworked all of them to publish the novel as a separate book.

== Characters ==
- Vladimir Mikhaylovich Golovlyov, head of the family. "From early years known for his good-for-nothing, carefree nature", according to the author. "Spent most of his time in a cabinet, imitating the singing of blackbirds, roosters and such and amused himself with writing what he termed 'liberated verses' and what became the object of hatred for his wife... [He] hated his wife with great sincerity which included, though, a strong portion of cowardice."
- Arina Petrovna, "a woman of about sixty but still spry, and used to living according her own will". Quite intimidating, she rules uncontrollably the vast Golovlyov estate, lives alone and almost ascetically, befriends none of the neighbours, is kind to local authorities and demands from children that they be so tame as ask themselves each time: "what would mummy say of this?"
- Stepan Vladimirovich, the eldest son, nicknamed by his mother "Styopka the Nitwit". "From early years he found himself among the unloved ones and got used to either be a pariah or to play a jester... Unfortunately he was a gifted, utterly impressive guy. From his father he inherited a mischievous character, from his mother the ability to quickly guess other people's weaknesses."
- Anna Vladimirovna, the daughter. Caused embarrassment to Arina Petrovna by eloping from the estate with a cornet and returning two years later without money but with two twin daughters. Three months on, Anna died.
- Porfiry Vladimirovich, known from childhood by three names: "Little Judas" (Iudushka), "Bloodsucker" and "Sincere Boy", all given to him by Styopka the Nitwit. "From early childhood he loved to coax affection from his "dearest friend mammenka", to secretly kiss her shoulder and to report on others from time to time... Even then Arina Petrovna treated suspiciously her son's attempts to soften her up. Even then his eyes' hard look seemed to her mysterious and she couldn't guess what exactly was in it, venom or respect."
- Pavel Vladimirovich, Porfiry's brother and his antipode. "That was a total embodiment of a creature unable for any action. Even from childhood he showed no eagerness towards learning or socializing through games but preferred to stay alone, shying people. He would get himself into a corner, puff himself up and start fantasizing. Like, he'd imagine himself having eaten too much oatmeal so that his legs became thin and he'd be freed from school."
- Vladimir and Pyotr, the sons of Porfiry Vladimirovich. Vladimir commits suicide; Pyotr dies on his way to exile for embezzlement.
- Anninka and Liubinka, the twin daughters of Anna Vladimirovna. Following the death of their mother, brought up by Arina Petrovna. Once grown up, they become provincial actresses.

== Synopsis ==
=== Family Tribunal ===
Arina Petrova, matriarch of the Golovlyov family, runs a large estate (4,000 serfs) in Russia. She learns that her first born son, Stepan/Styopka/The Dolt has squandered the land and house she gave to him. She was a practical and strict noblewoman, and she banished her drunken husband Vladmir Mihailitch to his room for several decades while she ran the estate. Arina sent Stepan to college, where he was the class clown. He worked in a series of government jobs, but lost them all due to laziness. He returns home after losing his estate. Arina’s second child is Anna, who ran off and married a musician named Ulanov. Anna has twin girls Anninka and Lubinka. Ulanov soon abandons his family, and Anna dies of an illness 3 months later. Arina hoped to be rid of her children by giving them estates. She was very upset when Anna died (“throwing her two brats on to my shoulders”) and when Stepan returned. Her third son is Porphyry/Iudushka/Bloodsucker; he is an obsequious, scheming son. Her fourth son is Pavel; he is normal and unremarkable in any way. She keeps her family on a very tight financial leash, and they live at poverty level despite their wealth. Stepan, having nowhere to go, sadly travels back home. Arina declares that she hates him, and says "he has been nothing but a worry and a disgrace to me all his life.” She wonders who she is saving her money for. Stepan is let back into the estate, but becomes depressed and runs away one winter evening. He is found alive but never speaks again; he dies shortly thereafter.

=== Good Relatives ===
Serfdom is abolished by the Tsar. Vladimir Mihailitch dies and Arina divides her estate between her 2 remaining children. Pavel dies from alcoholism having refused to make a will. This means everything goes to Porphyry. Arina leaves the big house and moves in with her orphaned twin granddaughters to the Pogorelka estate. Porphyry gets married and has 2 sons. He becomes very religious, but it is only for show.

=== Casting Up ===
While Arina is very strict with the girls, her energy for managing an estate is waning. The girls demand to leave, and she lets them. Arina becomes depressed living in an empty house in rural Russia. She begins visiting her son for good food and conversation. Porphyry’s wife dies, and he takes a lover, Yevpraxeya. The twins write back that they have both become successful provincial actresses and can support themselves. Porphyry’s first son, Volodya, kills himself. Porphyry’s second son, Pyotr/Petenka, arrives unexpectedly to beg for money. He was an infantry treasurer that has gambled the unit’s money away. Pyotr explains that Volodya killed himself because Porphyry refused to support him and his new wife (Volodya informed, but didn’t ask permission for the marriage). Porphyry refuses to pay the debt, sending Pyotr away to await trial.

=== The Niece ===
Arina falls ill. Porphyry calls for the twins as Arina dies. Prophyry’s son Pyotr is banished to Siberia and he dies on the way there. Anninka arrives to settle some paperwork since Arina died. The twins want to continue their acting careers, and have no interest in moving back. Porphyry has become a compulsive talker. Anninka’s visit with Porphyry is awful and she leaves as soon as the papers are signed.

=== Illicit Family Joys ===
Yevpraxeya becomes pregnant with Porphyry’s child. He is afraid of a scandal, so he ignores the pregnancy and denies any involvement. She gives birth to a boy; Porphyry feels guilty for having a child out of wedlock, so he sends the baby to the orphanage without Yevpraxeya’s knowledge.

=== The Derelict ===
Yevpraxeya, deprived of her child, decides to ruin Porphyry’s life. She begins to complain incessantly and refuses to listen to Porphyry’s constant babbling. She takes several lovers. Porphyry becomes a recluse and begins to lose his mind.

=== The Reckoning ===
The twins’ middling acting careers eventually turn them into prostitutes. They both are with 2 municipal treasurers, who embezzle funds to fuel their relationships. When everything is discovered, the twins decide to commit suicide together. Only Lubinka drinks the poison and dies. A depleted Anninka arrives at Golovlyov in the winter. Anninka and Porphyry begin drinking heavily together each night. While reminiscing, they get into awful screaming fights. Porphyry slowly realizes that he has been awful to everybody his entire life. He wonders who he was saving all of his money for. As Holy Week approaches, Porphyry’s guilt overcomes him. He leaves in the night to ask for forgiveness at his mother’s grave. He is found frozen to death the next day. Anninka is unconscious on her death bed. A messenger goes to inform a distant relative (Nadya Galkin) about being the new heir to the Golovlyov estate and capital.

== Themes and style ==
The Golovlyov Family grew up from The Well-Meant Speeches, a series of satirical stories and sketches, intended as critical studies of the "pillars of society". On January 2, 1881, Saltykov explained his work in a letter to Yevgeny Utin: "I took a look at the family, the state, the property and found out that none of such things exist. And that those very principles for the sake of which freedoms have been granted, were not respected as principles any more, even by those who seemed to hold them." The novel focuses on the institution of the family as cornerstone of society: unlike the conservatives, who portray the traditional family in positive tones, Saltykov gives an image of a dysfunctional family.

Unlike his other works, in which Saltykov condemns the serfdom for its cruelty caused to the serfs, in The Golovlyov Family he condemns is for what it did to the masters, whom he shows to have been its moral victims. In contrast to the "gentry nests" depicted by Ivan Turgenev (Home of the Gentry) and Leo Tolstoy, Golovlyovo becomes a symbolical source of the family's malaise.

However, as I. P. Foote notes, social-historical interest of the novel is overshadowed by the psychological portrayal of the two main characters, Porfiry Vladimirovich and Arina Petrovna.

James Wood calls Shchedrin a precursor of Knut Hamsun and the modernists:

The closer Shchedrin gets close to Porphyry, the more unknowable he actually becomes. In this sense, Porphyry is a modernist prototype: the character who lacks an audience, the alienated actor. The hypocrite who does not know that he is one, and really be told that he is one by anyone around him, is something of a revolutionary type of character, for he has no "true" knowable self, no "stable" ego... Around the turn of the twentieth century, Knut Hamsun, a novelist strongly influenced by Dostoevsky and the Russian novel, would invent a newkind of character: the lunatic heroes of his novels Hunger and Mysteries go around telling falsely incriminating stories about themselves and acting badly when they have no obvious reason to. [...] The line from Dostoevsky, through Shchedrin, and on to Hamsun, is visible.

As Foote notes, the ending of the novel reveals "Saltykov's view that human decency and dignity can be obtained by even the most abject of beings". The role of conscience in "bringing about a transformation of human life" is an important theme in Saltykov's other works, particularly in the novel The History of a Town.

== Screen adaptations ==
- House of Greed (1933), a film, directed by Aleksandr Ivanovsky.
- The Golovlyov Family (2006), a TV play, directed by Kirill Serebrennikov.
- The Golovlyov Family (2010), a TV series, directed by Alexander Yerofeev.

== English translations ==
- Athelstan Ridgway (1910, as The Gollovlev Family, published by Jarrold & Sons), now in the Public Domain.
- Avrahm Yarmolinsky (1917, as A Family of Noblemen: The Gentlemen Golovliov, published by Boni & Liveright), now in the Public Domain.
- Natalie Duddington (1931, as The Golovlyov Family, published by The Macmillan Company, reissued in 1934 and in 1955 by Everyman's Library and 2001 by NYRB Classics).
- Andrew R. MacAndrew (1961, as The Golovlovs, published by Signet Classics, The New American Library).
- Olga Shartse (1975, as The Golovlyovs, Progress Publishers, Moscow).
- Samuel D. Cioran (1979, as The Golovlyov Family, published by Ardis Publishers, reissued in 2013 by The Overlook Press).
- I. P. Foote (1986, as The Golovlevs, published by Oxford University Press, reissued in 2019 by Head of Zeus).
- Ronald Wilks (1988, as The Golovlyov Family, published by Penguin Classics).
