= Poshlost =

Russian word for amorality, vulgarity, lack of originality, and bad taste

Poshlost or poshlost' (Russian: пошлость, IPA: [ˈpoʂləsʲtʲ]) is a pejorative Russian word for amorality, vulgarity, a lack of originality, and/or bad taste. It has been cited as an example of a so-called untranslatable word, because there is no exact single-word English equivalent. It carries much cultural baggage in Russia and has been discussed at length by various writers.

It is derived from the adjective póshlyy (пошлый), which may describe a negative human character trait, a manmade object, or an idea.

== Description ==
Svetlana Boym defines poshlost' as "obscenity and bad taste". She says:

Poshlost' is the Russian version of banality, with a characteristic national flavoring of metaphysics and high morality, and a peculiar conjunction of the sexual and the spiritual. This one word encompasses triviality, vulgarity, sexual promiscuity, and a lack of spirituality. The war against poshlost' was a cultural obsession of the Russian and Soviet intelligentsia from the 1860s to 1960s.

It has also been defined as "petty evil or self-satisfied vulgarity".

In his novels, Turgenev "tried to develop a heroic figure who could, with the verve and abandon of a Don Quixote, grapple with the problems of Russian society, who could once and for all overcome 'poshlost', the complacent mediocrity and moral degeneration of his environment". Dostoevsky applied the word to the Devil; Solzhenitsyn, to Western-influenced young people.

D. S. Mirsky was an early user of the word in English in writing about Gogol; he defined it as "'self-satisfied inferiority,' moral and spiritual".

Another literary treatment is Fyodor Sologub's novel The Petty Demon. It tells the story of a provincial schoolteacher, Peredonov, notable for his complete lack of redeeming human qualities. James H. Billington said of it:

The book puts on display a Freudian treasure chest of perversions with subtlety and credibility. The name of the novel's hero, Peredonov, became a symbol of calculating concupiscence for an entire generation... [Peredonov] seeks not the ideal world but the world of petty venality and sensualism, poshlost'. He torments his students, derives erotic satisfaction from watching them kneel to pray, and systematically befouls his apartment before leaving it as part of his generalized spite against the universe.

=== Nabokov ===
Vladimir Nabokov made the term more widely known in his book on Gogol, where he romanized it as "poshlust" (punningly: "posh" + "lust"). Poshlust, Nabokov explained, "is not only the obviously trashy but mainly the falsely important, the falsely beautiful, the falsely clever, the falsely attractive. A list of literary characters personifying poshlust will include... Polonius and the royal pair in Hamlet, Rodolphe and Homais from Madame Bovary, Laevsky in Chekhov's 'The Duel', Joyce's Marion [Molly] Bloom, young Bloch in Search of Lost Time, Maupassant's 'Bel Ami', Anna Karenina's husband, and Berg in War and Peace". Nabokov also listed:

Corny trash, vulgar clichés, Philistinism in all its phases, imitations of imitations, bogus profundities, crude, moronic and dishonest pseudo-literature—these are obvious examples. Now, if we want to pin down poshlost in contemporary writing we must look for it in Freudian symbolism, moth-eaten mythologies, social comment, humanistic messages, political allegories, overconcern with class or race, and the journalistic generalities we all know.

In a New York Times piece about Fyodor Dostoevsky, whom he considered an exemplar of poshlost, Nabokov further characterized it as being "cheap," "sham," "smutty," "highfalutin," and "in bad taste."

Nabokov often targeted poshlost in his own work; the Alexandrov definition above of "petty evil or self-satisfied vulgarity" refers to the character of M'sieur Pierre in Nabokov's Invitation to a Beheading.

== See also ==
- Kitsch
- Middlebrow

== Bibliography ==
- Alexandrov, Vladimir (1991). Nabokov's Otherworld. Princeton University Press. ISBN 0-691-06866-6.
- Billington, James H. (1966). The Icon and the Axe: An Interpretive History of Russian Culture. Alfred A. Knopf.
- Boym, Svetlana (1994). Common Places: Mythologies of Everyday Life in Russia. Harvard University Press. ISBN 0-674-14625-5.
- ——— (2001). The Future of Nostalgia. Basic Books. p. 279. ISBN 0-465-00707-4.
- Davydov, Sergej (1995). "Poshlost'". In Alexandrov, V (ed.). The Garland Companion to Vladimir Nabokov. Routledge. pp. 628–32. ISBN 0-8153-0354-8.
- Lindstrom, Thais (1966). A Concise History of Russian Literature. Volume I: From the Beginnings to Chekhov. New York: New York University Press. LCCN 66-22218.
- Mirsky, D. S. (1927). A History of Russian Literature: From Its Beginnings to 1900 (1999 ed.). Northwestern University Press. ISBN 0-8101-1679-0.
- Nabokov, Vladimir (1944). Nikolai Gogol. New Directions. ISBN 9780811201209.
- ——— (1973). Strong Opinions. McGraw-Hill. p. 100. The original interview, with Herbert Gold in the October 1967 issue of the Paris Review, is available on line, and an extract is available in a Time article (Dec. 1, 1967) about the interview.
- Taruskin, Richard (2009). On Russian Music. University of California Press. ISBN 978-0-520-24979-0.
