= Andrey Krayevsky =

Russian publisher and journalist (1810-1889)

Andrey Alexandrovich Krayevsky
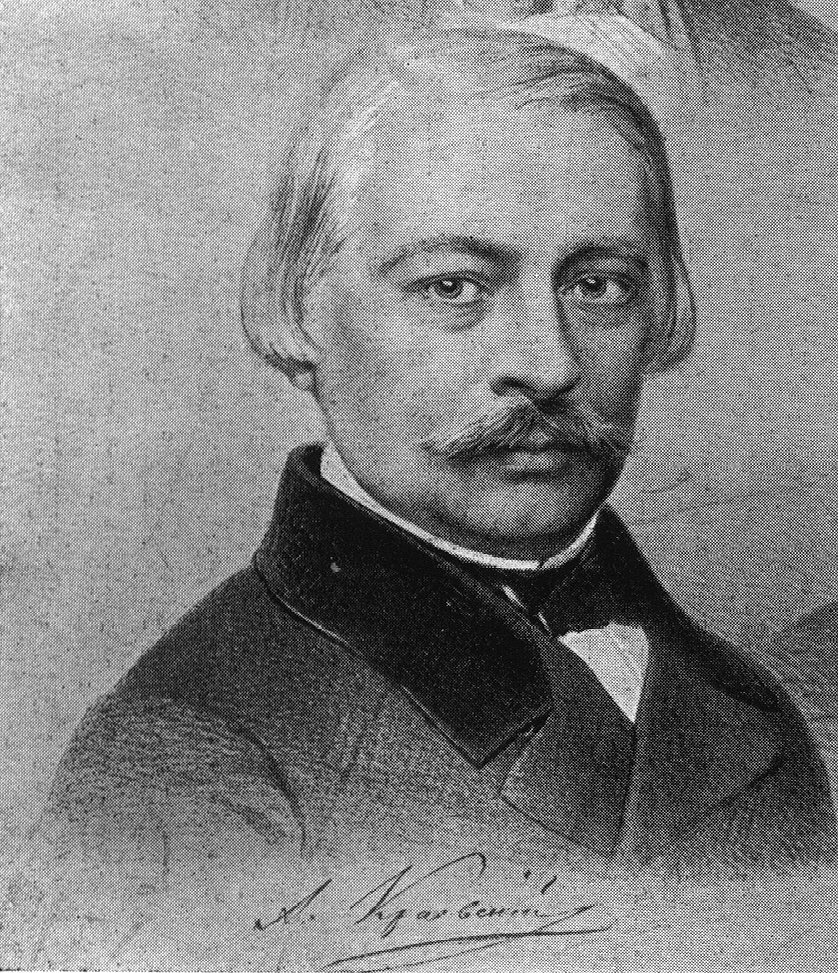
- 1856 portrait by Vasily Timm
- Born: February 17, 1810; Moscow, Russian Empire
- Died: August 12, 1889 (aged 79); Pavlovsk, Russian Empire
- Occupations: editor publisher journalist
- Years active: 1835–1880s

Andrey Alexandrovich Krayevsky (Russian: Андре́й Алекса́ндрович Крае́вский; February 17 [O.S. 5], 1810 – August 20 [O.S. 8], 1889) was a Russian publisher and journalist, best known for his work as an editor-in-chief of Otechestvennye Zapiski (1839–1867), the influential literary journal of which he was also publisher. Another well-known publication Krayevsky founded (in 1863) was the popular newspaper Golos (The Voice).

== Biography ==
Andrey Krayevsky was born in Moscow, an illegitimate grandson of the chief of the Moscow police Nikolai Arkharov in whose house he was brought up and received primary education. In 1823 he enrolled at Moscow University, from which he graduated in 1828.

After graduation Krayevsky joined Moscow's Governor-General's office. He soon began to write articles and reviews for local publications. In 1831 he moved to St. Petersburg to work in the Ministry of Public Education. While serving in that office, in 1835 he started a newsletter for the ministry.

Vladimir Odoyevsky introduced Krayevsky to the Russian capital's literary circles. Pyotr Pletnyov invited him to Sovremennik, first as a technical editor. After Alexander Pushkin's death Krayevsky took part in sorting out of the great poet's archives and became one of five Sovremennik’s co-publishers. In 1836 Krayevsky introduced Mikhail Lermontov to the Saint Petersburg cultural elite and was his literary mentor for a time.

In 1837, Krayevsky started editing Russky Invalid's Literary Supplement, an obscure newspaper he soon transformed into the popular Literaturnaya Gazeta. In 1839 he became the editor and publisher of Otechestvennye Zapiski, a journal he originally took on lease from Pavel Svinyin. With a stellar team of authors and critics (Vladimir Odoyevsky, Evgeny Baratynsky, Vasily Zhukovsky, Alexander Veltman, Pyotr Vyazemsky, Alexey Koltsov, Nikolay Gogol, later – Vissarion Belinsky, Alexander Hertzen, Nikolay Nekrasov, Fyodor Dostoyevsky (from 1846), Ivan Turgenev, Ivan Goncharov) in the mid-1840s Krayevsky's OZ became one of the most successful and respected Russian publications. After Belinsky's departure in 1846, Krayevsky was keen on keeping the magazine's high profile, but the change of the political atmosphere in the country forced him to make compromises. An 1848, a pro-monarchist article called "Russia and The Western Europe as They Stand Now", saw him shifting from the left to the center-right of the Russian literary world's political spectrum.

In 1845, Krayevsky began an effort to publish Russian translations of all Sir Walter Scott's novels, but failed to finish this project. Krayevsky was a co-editor of Russky Invalid (1843–1852), Sankt-Peterburgskie Vedomosti (1852–1862, with the circulation rising up to 12,000). In 1863 he founded the highly popular newspaper Golos, its circulation reaching the high point of 23,000. In 1866 he became one of the creators of the first ever Russian Telegraph Agency (RTA).

Andrey Krayevsky died on 20 (8, old style) 1889 in Pavlovsk, Saint Petersburg.
