= Mikhail Saltykov-Shchedrin =

Russian author and satirist (1826–1889)

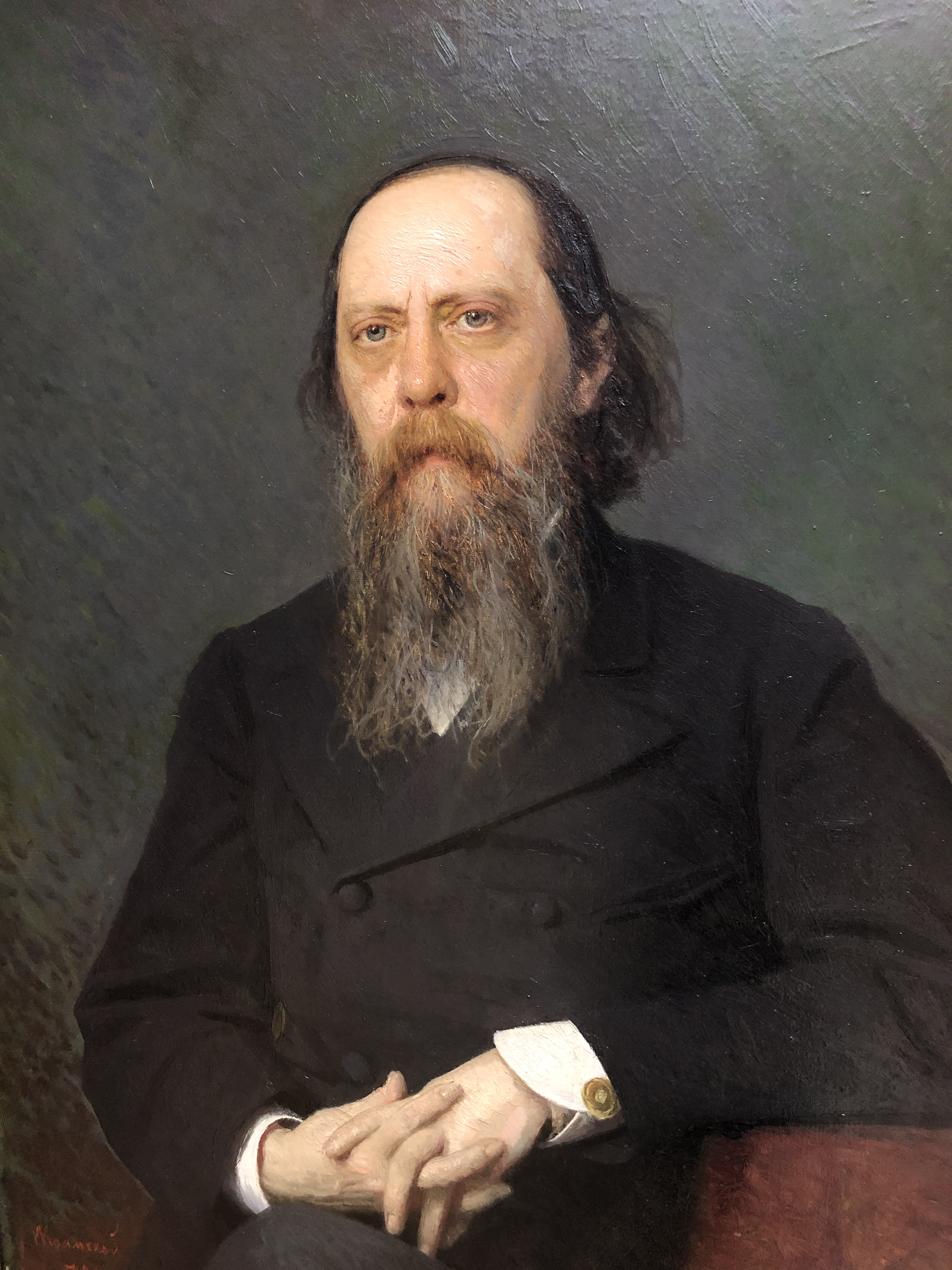
- Portrait of Shchedrin by Ivan Kramskoi
- Born: 27 January 1826 village Spas-Ugol, Kalyazin uyezd, Tver Governorate, Russian Empire
- Died: 10 May 1889 (aged 63); Saint Petersburg, Russian Empire
- Occupations: Novelist, journalist, short story writer, playwright, civil administrator, magazine editor
- Spouse: Elizaveta Boltova
- Relatives: Saltykov family
- Writing career
- Pen name: N. Shchedrin, Nikolai Shchedrin
- Period: 1847—1889
- Notable works: The History of a Town; The Golovlyov Family; Fables
- Movements: Realism, natural school

Mikhail Yevgrafovich Saltykov-Shchedrin (Russian: Михаи́л Евгра́фович Салтыко́в-Щедри́н, IPA: [mʲɪxɐˈil jɪvˈɡrafəvʲɪtɕ səltɨˈkof ɕːɪˈdrʲin]; 27 January [O.S. 15 January] 1826 – 10 May [O.S. 28 April] 1889), born Mikhail Yevgrafovich Saltykov and known during his lifetime by the pen name Nikolai Shchedrin (Russian: Николай Щедрин), was a major Russian writer and satirist of the 19th century, known for his sharp criticism of slavery. He spent most of his life working as a civil servant in various capacities. After the death of poet Nikolay Nekrasov, he acted as editor of a Russian literary magazine Otechestvenniye Zapiski until the Tsarist government banned it in 1884. In his works Saltykov mastered both stark realism and satirical grotesque merged with fantasy. His most famous works, the family chronicle novel The Golovlyov Family (1880) and the novel The History of a Town (1870), also translated as Foolsburg, became important works of 19th-century fiction, and Saltykov is regarded as a major figure of Russian literary Realism.

== Biography ==
Mikhail Saltykov was born on 27 January 1826 in the village of Spas-Ugol (modern-day Taldomsky District of the Moscow Oblast of Russia) as one of the eight children (five brothers and three sisters) in the large Russian noble family of Yevgraf Vasilievich Saltykov (1776–1851) and Olga Mikhaylovna Saltykova (née Zabelina; 1801–74). His father belonged to an ancient Saltykov noble house that originated as one of the branches of the Morozov boyar family. According to the Velvet Book, it was founded by Mikhail Ignatievich Morozov nicknamed Saltyk (from the Old Church Slavonic word "saltyk" meaning "one's own way/taste"), the son of Ignaty Mikhailovich Morozov and a great-grandson of the founder of the dynasty Ivan Semyonovich Moroz who lived during the 14–15th centuries. The Saltykov family also shared the Polish Sołtyk coat of arms. It gave birth to many important political figures throughout history, including the tsaritsa of Russia Praskovia Saltykova and her daughter, the Empress of Russia Anna Ioannovna.

Saltykov's mother was an heir to a rich Moscow merchant of the 1st level guild Mikhail Petrovich Zabelin whose ancestors belonged to the so-called trading peasants and who was granted hereditary nobility for his handsome donation to the army needs in 1812; his wife Marfa Ivanovna Zabelina also came from wealthy Moscow merchants. At the time of Mikhail Saltykov's birth, Yevgraf was fifty years old, while Olga was twenty five. Mikhail spent his early years on his parents' large estate in Spasskoye on the border of the Tver and Yaroslavl governorates, in the Poshekhonye region.

"In my childhood and teenage years I witnessed serfdom at its worst. It saturated all strata of social life, not just the landlords and the enslaved masses, degrading all classes, privileged or otherwise, with its atmosphere of a total lack of rights, when fraud and trickery were the order of the day, and there was an all-pervading fear of being crushed and destroyed at any moment," he remembered, speaking through one of the characters of his later novel Old Years in Poshekhonye. Life in the Saltykov family was equally difficult. Dominating the weak, religious father was despotic mother whose intimidating persona horrified the servants and her own children. This atmosphere was later recreated in Shchedrin's novel The Golovlyov Family, and the idea of "the devastating effect of legalized slavery upon the human psyche" would become one of the prominent motifs of his prose. Olga Mikhaylovna, though, was a woman of many talents; having perceived some in Mikhail, she treated him as her favorite.

The Saltykovs often quarreled; they gave their children neither love nor care and Mikhail, despite enjoying relative freedom in the house, remembered feeling lonely and neglected. Another thing Saltykov later regretted was his having been completely shut out from nature in his early years: the children lived in the main house and were rarely allowed to go out, knowing their "animals and birds only as boiled and fried." Characteristically, there were few descriptions of nature in the author's works.

=== Education ===
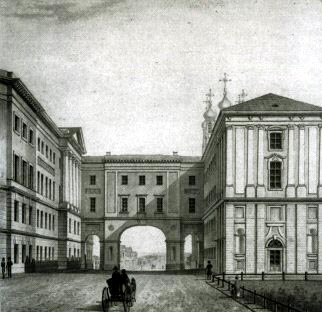
19th century drawing of the Tsarskoye Selo Lyceum, where Saltykov studied

Mikhail's early education was desultory, but, being an extraordinarily perceptive boy, by the age of six he spoke French and German fluently. He was taught to read and write Russian by the serf painter Pavel Sokolov and a local clergyman, and became an avid reader, later citing the Gospel, which he read at the age of eight, as a major influence. Among his childhood friends was Sergey Yuriev, the son of a neighbouring landlord and later a prominent literary figure, editor and publisher of the magazines Russkaya Mysl and Beseda. In 1834 his elder sister Nadezhda graduated from the Moscow Ekaterininsky college, and Mikhail's education from then on was the prerogative of her friend Avdotya Vasilevskaya, a graduate of the same institute who had been invited to the house as a governess. Mikhail's other tutors included the local clergyman Ivan Vasilievich who taught the boy Latin and the student Matvey Salmin.

At the age of ten Saltykov joined the third class of the Moscow Institute for sons of the nobility (Dvoryansky institute), skipping the first two classes, where he studied until 1838. He then enrolled in the Tsarskoye Selo Lyceum in Saint Petersburg, spending the next six years there. Prince Aleksey Lobanov-Rostovsky, afterwards the Minister Of Foreign Affairs, was one of his schoolfellows. In the lyceum the quality of education was poor. "The information taught to us was scant, sporadic and all but meaningless… It was not so much an education as such, but a part of social privilege, the one that draws the line through life: above are you and me, people of leisure and power, beneath – just one single word: muzhik," Saltykov wrote in his Letters to Auntie.

While at the lyceum Saltykov started writing poetry and translated works from Lord Byron and Heinrich Heine. He was proclaimed an 'heir to Pushkin' – after the local tradition which demanded that each course should have one. His first poem, "The Lyre", a hymn to the great Russian poet, was published by Biblioteka Dlya Chteniya in 1841. Eight more of Saltykov's verses made their way into Sovremennik in 1844–45. At the time he was attending Mikhail Yazykov's literary circle, which was occasionally visited by Vissarion Belinsky. The latter's articles and essays made a great impression on Mikhail.

Upon graduating the Lyceum in 1844, Saltykov, who was one of the best students, was promoted directly to the chancellery of the Ministry of Defense. This success upset Mikhail, as it ended his dream of attending Saint Petersburg University. The same year he became involved with Otechestvennye zapiski and Sovremennik, reviewing for both magazines children's literature and textbooks. His criticism was sharp, and Belinsky's influence on it was evident. At this time Saltykov became a follower of the Socialist ideas coming from France. "Brought up by Belinsky's articles, I naturally drifted towards the Westernizers' camp, but not to the major trend of it which was dominant in Russian literature at the time, promoting German philosophy, but to this tiny circle that felt instinctively drawn towards France - the country of Saint-Simon, Fourier... and, in particular, George Sand... Such sympathies only grew stronger after 1848," he later remembered. Saltykov befriended literary critic Valerian Maykov and economist and publicist Vladimir Milyutin, and became close to the Petrashevsky circle. "How easily we lived and what deep faith we had in the future, what single-mindedness and unity of hopes there was, giving us life!" he later remembered, calling Mikhail Petrashevsky "a dear, unforgettable friend and teacher."

=== Literary career ===
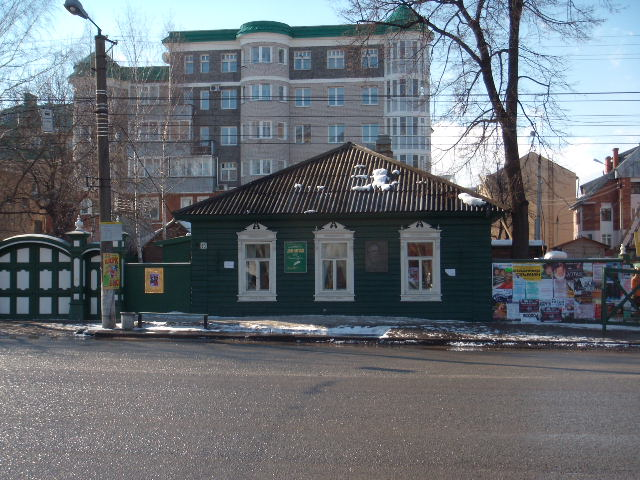
Saltykov's house in Vyatka (now a museum in Kirov)

In 1847 Saltykov debuted with his first novella Contradictions (under the pseudonym M.Nepanov), the title referring to the piece's main motif: the contrast between one's noble ideals and the horrors of real life. It was followed by A Complicated Affair (1848), a social novella, reminiscent of Gogol, both in its plotlines and the natures of its characters, dealing with social injustice and the inability of an individual to cope with social issues. The novella was praised by Nikolai Dobrolyubov who wrote: "It is full of heartfelt sympathy for destitute men... awakening in one humane feelings and manly thoughts," and Nikolai Chernyshevsky, who referred to it as a book "that has created a stir and is of much interest to people of the new generation." It was the publication of Contradictions that caused Saltykov's banishment to Vyatka, - apparently the result of overreaction from the authorities in response to the French Revolution of 1848. On 26 April 1848, Tsar Nicholas I signed the order for the author's arrest and deportation.

In his first few months of exile Saltykov was mainly occupied with copying official documents. Then he was made a special envoy of the Vyatka governor; his major duty in this capacity was making inquiries concerning brawls, cases of minor bribery, embezzlement and police misdoings. Saltykov made desperate attempts to break free from what he called his 'Vyatka captivity', but after each of his requests he received the standard reply: "would be premature." He became more and more aware of the possibility that he'd have to spend the rest of his life there. "The very thought of that is so repellent that it makes by hair bristle," he complained in a letter to his brother. It helped that the local elite treated Saltykov with great warmth and sympathy; he was made a welcome guest in many respectable houses, including that of vice-governor Boltin whose daughter Elizaveta Apollonovna later became Saltykov's wife.

While in Vyatka Saltykov got carried away by the idea of radically improving the quality of education for young women and girls. There were no decent history textbooks at the time in Russia, so he decided to write one himself. Called A Brief History of Russia, it amounted to 40 handwritten pages of compact text compiled from numerous sources. He worked on it while on vacation in a village near Tver, sending it to Vyatka to be published as a series.

As the numerous members of the Petrashevsky Circle were arrested in 1848, Saltykov got summoned to the capital to give evidence on his involvement in the group's activity. There he managed to convince the authorities that 'spreading harm' was not his intention and safely returned to Vyatka. In the summer of 1850 he became a councillor of the local government which implied long voyages through the province on official business, many of them having to do with issues concerning the Old Believers. As an investigator, he traveled throughout the Vyatka, Perm, Kazan, Nizhny Novgorod and Yaroslavl governorates. In 1850 he became the organizer of the Vyatka agricultural exhibition, one of the largest in the country. All this provided Saltykov with priceless material for his future satires.

==== Provincial Sketches ====
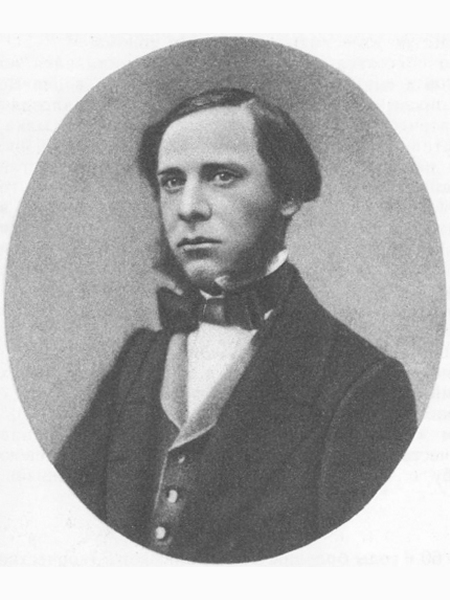
Saltykov-Shchedrin in 1850s

In 1855 Tzar Nicholas I died and the climate in the country instantly changed. In November 1855 Saltykov received the permission to leave Vyatka, the new governor Lanskoy rumoured to be the major assisting force behind this. In January 1856 the writer returned to Saint Petersburg and in February was assigned to the Interior Ministry. By this time many of the stories and essays that would be known as Provincial Sketches have been written, a series of narratives about the fictitious town of Krutogorsk, shown as a symbol of Russian serfdom. Ivan Turgenev who happened to read them first was unimpressed and, following his advice (and bearing in mind still fierce censorship) Nikolai Nekrasov refused to publish the work in Sovremennik. In August 1856 Mikhail Katkov's The Russian Messenger started publishing Provincial Sketches, signed N.Shchedrin. The book, charged with anti-serfdom pathos and full of scathing criticism of provincial bureaucracy became instant success and made Saltykov famous. Many critics and colleagues called him the heir to Nikolai Gogol. "I'm in awe... Oh immortal Gogol, you must now be a happy man now to see such a genius emerging as your follower," Taras Shevchenko wrote in his diary. In 1857 Sovremennik at last reacted: both Dobrolyubov and Chernyshevsky rather belatedly praised Saltykov, characteristically, imparting to his work what it's never had: "aiming at the undermining the Empire's foundations."

In 1857 The Russian Messenger published Pazukhin's Death, a play which was quite in tune with Provincial Sketches. The production of it was banned with characteristic verdict of censors: "Characters presented there are set to prove our society lies in the state of total moral devastation." Another of Saltykov's plays, Shadows (1862–1865), about careerism and immorality of bureaucracy, has been discovered in archives and published only in 1914, when it was premiered on stage too.

Contrary to left radicals' attempt to draw Saltykov closer to their camp, "undermining the Empire's foundations" was not his aim at all and on his return to Saint Petersburg he was soon promoted to administrative posts of considerable importance. His belief was that "all honest men should help the government in defeating serfdom apologist still clinging to their rights." Huge literary success has never made him think of retiring from work in the government. Partly reasons for his return to the state service were practical. In 1856 Saltykov married Elizaveta Boltina, daughter of a Vyatka vice-governor and found, on the one hand, his mother's financial support curtailed, on the other, his own needs rose sharply. Up until 1858 Saltykov continued working in the Ministry of Internal Affairs. Then after making a report on the condition of the Russian police, he was appointed deputy governor of Ryazan where later he received the nickname "the vice-Robespierre". On April 15, 1858, Saltykov arrived to Ryazan very informally, in an ordinary road carriage, which amazed the local 'society' for whom he'd been known already as Provincial Sketches' author. He settled in a small house, often visited people and received guests. Saltykov's primary goal was to teach local minor officials elementary grammar and he spent many late evenings proof-reading and re-writing their incongruous reports. In 1862 Saltykov was transferred to Tver where he often performed governor's functions. Here Saltykov proved to be a zealous promoter of the 1861 reforms. He personally sued several landowners accusing them of cruel treatment of peasants.

All the while his literary activities continued. In 1860-1862 he wrote and published (mostly, in Vremya magazine) numerous sketches and short stories, some later included into Innocent Stories (1857–1863) which demonstrated what Maxim Gorky later called a "talent for talking politics through domesticities" and Satires In Prose (1859–1862) where for the first time the author seemed to be quite vexed with the apathy of the oppressed. "One is hardly to be expected to engage oneself in self-development when one's only thought revolves around just one wish: not to die of hunger," he later explained. Many of Saltykov's articles on agrarian reforms were also written in those three years, mostly in Moskovskye Vedomosty, where his major opponent was journalist Vladimir Rzhevsky.

==== Sovremennik ====
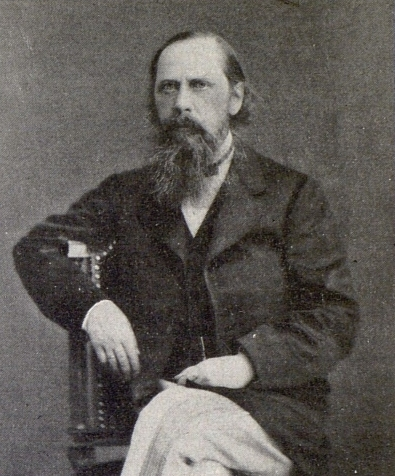
Mikhail Saltykov c. 1870

In 1862 Saltykov retired from the government service and came to Moscow with the view of founding his own magazine there. The Ministry of Education's Special committee under the chairmanship of Prince D.A.Obolensky gave him no such permission. In the early 1863 Saltykov moved to Saint Petersburg to join Nekrasov's Sovremennik, greatly undermined by the death of Dobrolyubov and Chernyshevsky's arrest. In this magazine he published first sketches of the Pompadours cycle and got involved with Svistok (The Whistle), a satirical supplement, using pseudonyms N.Shchedrin, K.Turin and Mikhail Zmiev-Mladentsev.

The series of articles entitled Our Social Life (1863–1864), examining “new tendencies in Russian nihilism,” caused a raw with equally radical Russkoye Slovo. First Saltykov ridiculed Dmitry Pisarev's unexpected call for Russian intelligentsia to pay more attention to natural sciences. Then in 1864 Pisarev responded by "Flowers of Innocent Humor" article published by Russkoye Slovo implying that Saltykov was cultivating "laughter for good digestion's sake". The latter's reply contained accusations in isolationism and elitism. All this (along with heated discussion of Chernyshevsky's novel What Is to Be Done?) was termed "raskol in Russian nihilism" by Fyodor Dostoyevsky.

On the other front, Saltykov waged a war against the Dostoyevsky brothers’ Grazhdanin magazine. When Fyodor Dostoyevsky came out with the suggestion that with Dobrolyubov's death and Chernyshevsky's imprisonment the radical movement in Russia became lifeless and dogmatic, Saltykov labeled him and his fellow pochvenniks 'reactionaries'. Finally, the rift between him and Maxim Antonovich (supported by Grigory Eliseev) made Saltykov-Schedrin quit the journal. Only a small part of stories and sketches that Saltykov wrote at the time has made its way into his later books (Innocent Stories, Sign of the Time, Pompadours).

Being dependent on his Sovremennik's meagre salaries, Saltykov was looking for work on the side and quarreled with Nekrasov a lot, promising to quit literature. According to Avdotya Panayeva's memoirs, "those were the times when his moods darkened, and I noticed a new habit of his developing - this jerky movement of neck, as if he was trying to free himself from some unseen tie, the habit which stayed with him for the rest of his life." Finally, pecuniary difficulties compelled Saltykov to re-enter the governmental service and in November 1864 he was appointed the head of the treasury department in Penza. Two years later he moved to take the same post in Tula, then Ryazan. Supported by his lyceum friend Mikhail Reitern, now the Minister of Finance, Saltykov adopted rather aggressive finance revision policies, making many enemies in the administrative circles of Tula, Ryazan and Penza. According to Alexander Skabichevsky (who had conversations with provincial officials working under Saltykov's supervision) "he was a rare kind of boss. Even though his frightful barking was making people wince, nobody feared him and everybody loved him - mostly for his caring for his subordinates' needs and also the tendency to overlook people's minor weaknesses and faults when those were not interfering with work."

Finally the governor of Ryazan made an informal complaint which was accounted for by Count Shuvalov, the Chief of Staff of the Special Corps of Gendarmes, who issued a note stating that Saltykov, as a senior state official "promoted ideas contradicting the needs of maintaining law and order" and was "always in conflict with people of local governments, criticizing and even sabotaging their orders." On July 14, 1868, Saltykov retired: thus the career of "one of the strangest officials in Russian history" ended. Years later, speaking to the historian M.Semevsky, Saltykov confessed he was trying to erase from memory years spent as a government official. But when his vis-a-vis argued that "only his thorough knowledge of every possible stage of the Russian bureaucratic hierarchy made him what he was," the writer had to agree.

==== Otechestvennye Zapiski ====
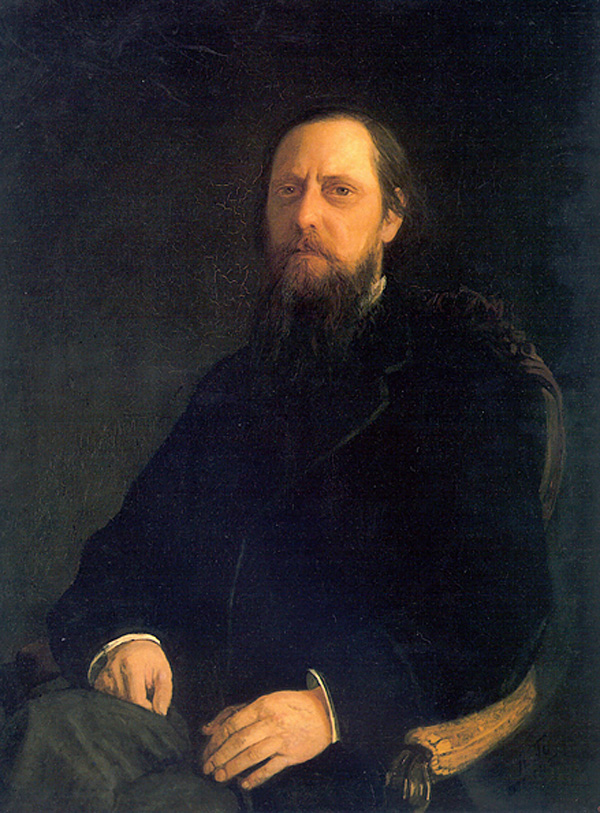
Mikhail Saltykov's portrait by Nikolai Ge, 1872.

On July 1, 1866, Sovremennik was closed. In the autumn Nekrasov approached the publisher Andrey Krayevsky and 'rented' Otechestvennye Zapiski. In September 1868 Saltykov joined the re-vamped team of the magazine as a head of the journalistic department. As in December 1874 Saltykov's health problems (triggered by severe cold he's caught at his mother's funeral) made him travel abroad for treatment, Nekrasov confessed in his April 1875 letter to Pavel Annenkov: "This journalism thing has always been tough for us and now it lies in tatters. Saltykov carried it all manly and bravely and we all tried our best to follow suit." "This was the only magazine that had its own face… Most talented people were coming to Otechestvennye Zapiski as if it were their home. They trusted my taste and my common sense never to begrudge my editorial cuts. In "OZ" there were published weak things, but stupid things - never," he wrote in a letter to Pavel Annenkov on May 28, 1884. In 1869 Saltykov's Signs of the Times and Letters About the Province came out, their general idea being that the reforms have failed and Russia remained the same country of absolute monarchy where peasant had no rights. "The bars have fallen but Russia's heart gave not a single twitch. Serfdom has been abolished, but landlords rejoiced," he wrote.

In 1870 The History of a Town (История одного города) came out, a grotesque, politically risky novel relating the tragicomic history of the fictitious Foolsville, a vague caricature upon the Russian Empire, with its sequence of monstrous rulers, tormenting their hapless vassals. The book was a satire on the whole institution of Russian statehood and the way of life itself, plagued by routine mismanagement, needless oppression, pointless tyranny and sufferers’ apathy. The novel ended with the deadly "it" sweeping the whole thing away, "making the history stop" which was construed by many as a call for radical political change. A series called Pompadours and Pompadouresses (published in English as The Pompadours, Помпадуры и помпадурши, 1863–1874) looked like a satellite to the History of a Town, a set of real life illustrations to the fantastic chronicles. The History of a Town caused much controversy. Alexey Suvorin accused the author of deliberately distorting Russian history and insulting the Russian people. "By showing how people live under the yoke of madness I was hoping to invoke in a reader not mirth but most bitter feelings... It is not the history of the state as a whole that I make fun of, but a certain state of things," Saltykov explained.

In 1873 came out The Tashkenters Clique (Господа Ташкентцы;Tashkent’ers was a generic term invented by Shchedrin for administrators sent to tame riots in the remote regions of the Russian Empire), a snipe at right-wingers who advocated cruel suppression of peasants' riots, and an experiment in the new form of social novel. 1877 saw the publication of In the Spheres of Temperance and Accuracy, a set of satirical sketches, featuring characters from the classical Russian literature (books by Fonvizin, Griboyedov, Gogol and others) in the contemporary political context.

=== Later years ===
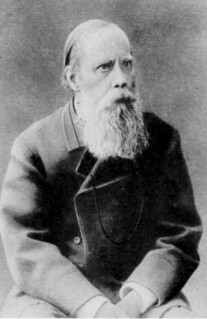
Saltykov in 1880

The Well-Meant Speeches (Благонамеренные речи, 1876) featured characters belonging to new Russian bourgeoisie. On January 2, 1881, Saltykov wrote to the lawyer and author Yevgeny Utin: "I took a look at the family, the state, the property and found out that none of such things exist. And that those very principles for the sake of which freedoms have been granted, were not respected as principles any more, even by those who seemed to hold them." The Well-Meant Speeches initially contained several stories about the Golovlyov family. In 1880 Saltykov-Shchedrin extracted all of them to begin a separate book which evolved into his most famous novel, showing the stagnation of the land-based dvoryanstvo. The Golovlyov Family (Господа Головлёвы, 1880; also translated as A Family of Noblemen), a crushingly gloomy study of the institution of the family as cornerstone of society, traced the moral and physical decline of three generations of a Russian gentry family. Central to it was the figure of Porfiry 'Little Judas' Golovlyov, a character whose nickname (Iudushka, in Russian transcription) became synonymous with mindless hypocrisy and self-destructive egotism, leading to moral degradation and disintegration of personality.

In the 1870s Saltykov sold his Moscow estate and bought the one near Oranienbaum, Saint Petersburg, which he came to refer to as 'my Mon Repos'. He proved to be an unsuccessful landowner, though, and finally sold it, having lost a lot of money. Stories vaguely describing this experience later made it into the novel Mon Repos Haven (Убежище Монрепо, 1879) and the collection of sketches All the Year Round (Круглый год), both books attacking the very roots of Russian capitalism. "Fatherland is a pie - that's the idea those narrow, obnoxious minds follow," he wrote. The latter collection remained unfinished due to fierceness of censorship in the wake of the assassination of Alexander II.

In 1875-1885 Saltykov was often visiting Germany, Switzerland and France for medical treatment. The result of these recreational trips was the series of sketches called Abroad (За рубежом, 1880–1881), expressing skepticism about the Western veneer of respectability which hid underneath horrors similar to the ones that were open in Russia (the latter portrayed as The Boy Without Pants, as opposed to The Boy in Pants, symbolizing Europe). In 1882 Letters to Auntie (Письма к тётеньке), written in the atmosphere of tough censorship came out, a satire on the society in general and its cultural elite in particular (the 'auntie' in question).

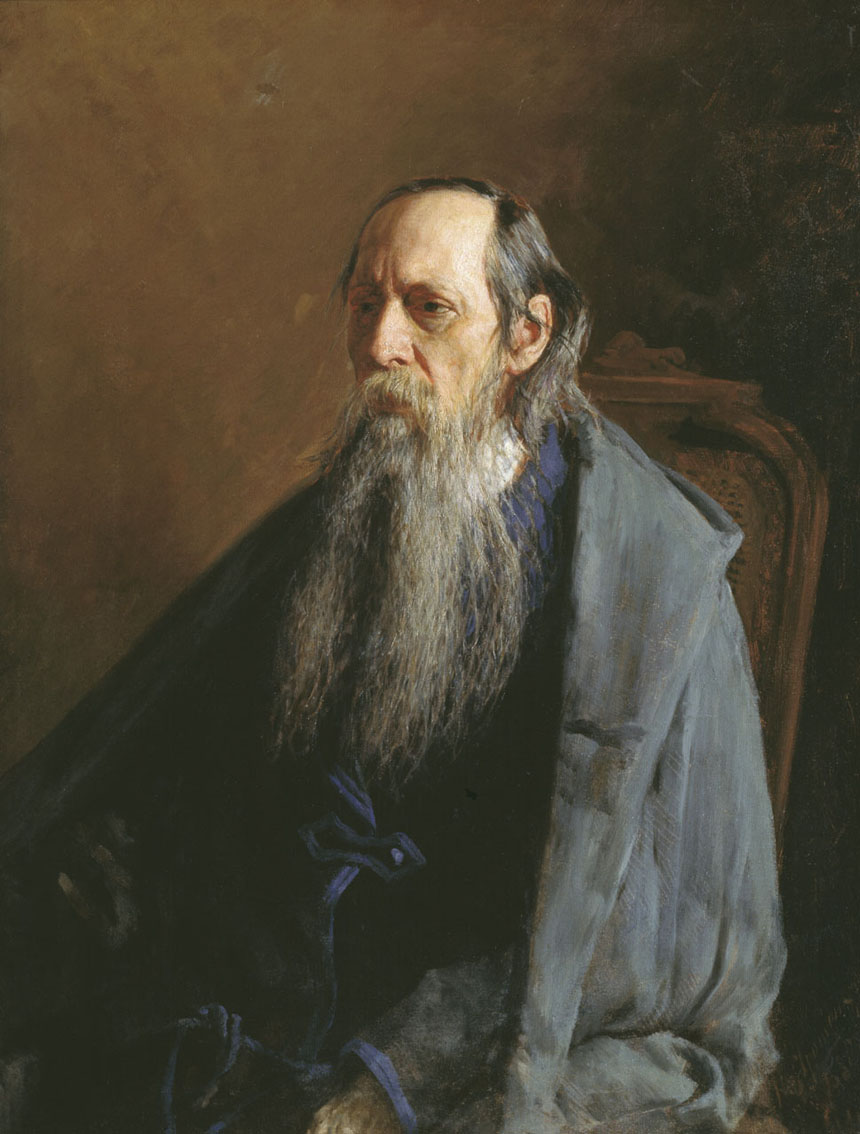
Portrait by Nikolai Yaroshenko, 1886

In 1883, now critically ill, Saltykov published Modern Idyll (Современная идиллия), the novel he started in 1877–1878, targeting those of intelligentsia who were eager to prove their loyalty to the authorities. The Poshekhonye Stories (Пошехонские рассказы, 1883), Motley Letters (Пёстрые письма, 1884) and Unfinished Talks (Недоконченные беседы, 1886) followed, but by this time Otechestvennye Zapiski were under increasing pressure from the censors, Shchedrin's prose being the latter's main target. The May 1874 issue with The Well-Meant Speeches has been destroyed, several other releases postponed for Saltykov's pieces to be excised. In 1874-1879 Otechestvennye Zapiski suffered 18 censorial sanctions, all having to do with Shchedrin's work, most of which (Well-Meant Speeches, Letters to Auntie, many fairytales) were banned. "It is despicable times that we are living through... and it takes a lot of strength not to give up," Saltykov wrote.

The demise of Otechestvennye Zapiski in 1884 dealt Saltykov a heavy blow. "The possibility to talk with my readers has been taken away from me and this pain is stronger than any other," he complained. "The whole of the Russian press suffered from the Otechestvenny Zapiski's closure… Where there's been a lively tissue now there is a chasm of emptiness. And Shchedrin's life has been curtailed, probably, for many years, by this 'excision'," wrote Korolenko in 1889. Saltykov-Shchedrin's last works were published by Vestnik Evropy and Russkye Vedomosti, among them a collection of satirical fables and tales Fairy Tales for Children of a Fair Age (Сказки для детей изрядного возраста, better known as Fables) and a cycle of sketches Small Things in Life (Мелочи жизни, 1881–1887), a set of realistic mini-dramas about common people destroyed by the terror of daily routine. Saltykov's last publication was semi-autobiographical novel Old Years in Poshekhonye (Пошехонская старина), published in 1887–1889 in Vestnik Evropy. He planned another piece called Forgotten Words (writing to Nikolai Mikhailovsky not long before his death: "There were, you know, words in Russian: honour, fatherland, humanity… They are worth of being reminded about") but never even started it.

Mikhail Evgraphovich Saltykov-Schedrin died of stroke in Saint Petersburg and was interred in the Volkovo Cemetery, next to Turgenev, according to his last wish.

== Legacy ==
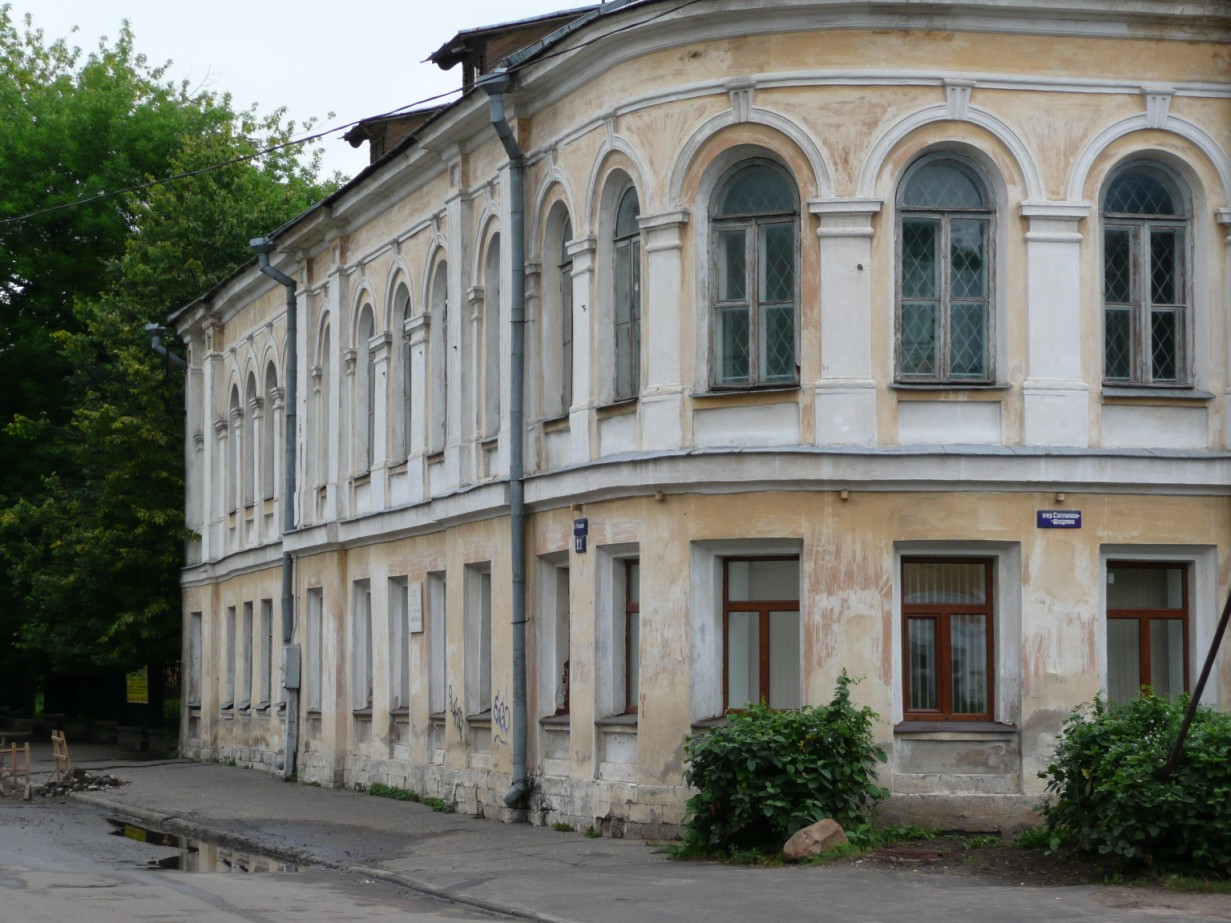
Saltykov-Schedrin Memorial House in Tver

Mikhail Bulgakov was among writers, influenced by Saltykov.

Mikhail Saltykov-Shchedrin is regarded to be the most prominent satirist in the history of the Russian literature. According to critic and biographer Maria Goryachkina, he managed to compile "the satirical encyclopedia" of contemporary Russian life, targeting first serfdom with its degrading effect upon the society, then, after its abolition, - corruption, bureaucratic inefficiency, opportunistic tendencies in intelligentsia, greed and amorality of those at power, but also - apathy, meekness and social immobility of the common people of Russia. His satirical cycle Fables and the two major works, The History of a Town and The Golovlyov Family, are widely regarded as his masterpieces. Maxim Gorky wrote in 1909: "The importance of his satire is immense, first for… its almost clairvoyant vision of the path the Russian society had to travel - from 1860s to nowadays."

James Wood calls Shchedrin a precursor of Knut Hamsun and the modernists:

The closer Shchedrin gets close to Porphyry, the more unknowable he actually becomes. In this sense, Porphyry is a modernist prototype: the character who lacks an audience, the alienated actor. The hypocrite who does not know that he is one, and really be told that he is one by anyone around him, is something of a revolutionary type of character, for he has no "true" knowable self, no "stable" ego... Around the turn of the twentieth century, Knut Hamsun, a novelist strongly influenced by Dostoevsky and the Russian novel, would invent a newkind of character: the lunatic heroes of his novels Hunger and Mysteries go around telling falsely incriminating stories about themselves and acting badly when they have no obvious reason to. <...> The line from Dostoevsky, through Shchedrin, and on to Hamsun, is visible.

Saltykov-Shchedrin has been lavishly praised by Soviet critics as "the true revolutionary", but his mindset (as far as they were concerned) was not without a "fault", for he, according to Goryachkina, "failed to recognize the historically progressive role of capitalism and never understood the importance of the emerging proletariat". Karl Marx (who knew Russian and held Shchedrin in high esteem) read Haven in Mon Repos (1878–1879) and was unimpressed. "The last section, 'Warnings', is weak and the author in general seems to be not very strong on positivity," he wrote. Marx was also known reading other books by the author, namely The Gentlemen from Tashkent and Diary of a Provincial in St. Petersburg; among the Russian authors that Marx read, he particularly valued Pushkin, Gogol and Shchedrin.

Some contemporaries (Nikolai Pisarev, Alexei Suvorin) dismissed Saltykov-Shchedrin as the one taken to 'laughing for laughter's sake'. Vladimir Korolenko disagreed; he regarded Shchedrin's laughter to be the essential part of Russian life. "Shchedrin, he's still laughing, people were saying, by way of reproach... Thankfully, yes, no matter how hard it was for him to do this, in the most morbid times of our recent history this laughter was heard… One had to have a great moral power to make others laugh, while suffering deeply (as he did) from all the grieves of those times," he argued.

According to D.S.Mirsky, the greater part of Saltykov's work is a rather nondescript kind of satirical journalism, generally with little or no narrative structure, and intermediate in form between the classical "character" and the contemporary feuilleton. Greatly popular though it was in its own time, it has since lost much of its appeal simply because it satirizes social conditions that have long ceased to exist and much of it has become unintelligible without commentary. Mirsky saw The History of a Town (a sort of parody of Russian history, concentrated in the microcosm of a provincial town, whose successive governors are transparent caricatures of Russian sovereigns and ministers, and whose very name is representative of its qualities) as the work that summed up the achievement of Saltykov's first period. He praised The Golovlyov Family, calling it the gloomiest book in all Russian literature—"all the more gloomy because the effect is attained by the simplest means without any theatrical, melodramatic, or atmospheric effects." "The most remarkable character of this novel is Porfiry Golovlyov, nicknamed 'Little Judas', the empty and mechanical hypocrite who cannot stop talking unctuous and meaningless humbug, not for any inner need or outer profit, but because his tongue is in need of constant exercise," Mirsky wrote.

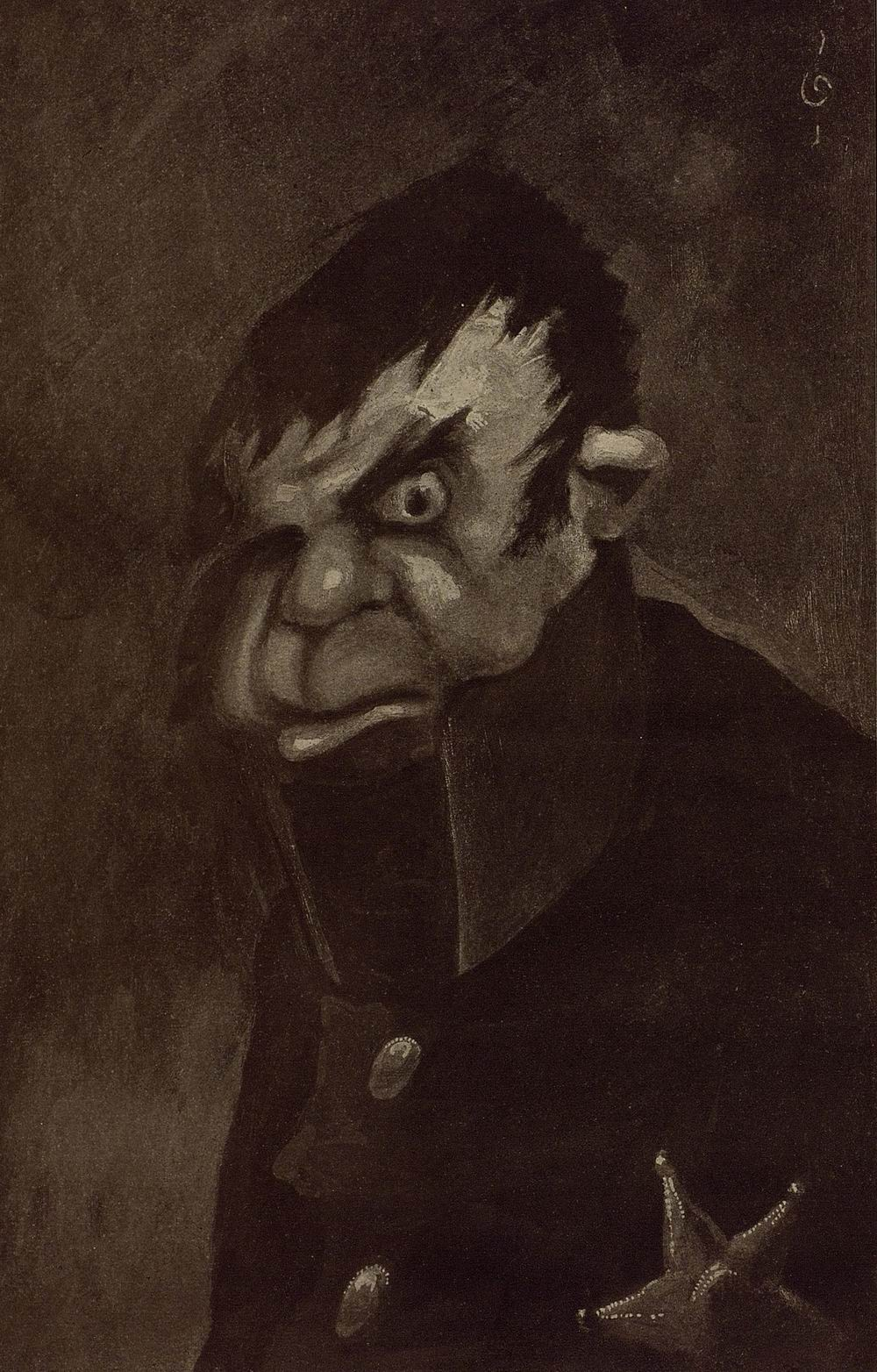
Portrait of Ugryum-Burcheev. Illustration to The History of a Town by Re-Mi (1907)

Most works of Saltykov's later period were written in a language that the satirist himself called Aesopian. This way, though, the writer was able to fool censors in the times of political oppression and take most radical ideas to print, which was the matter of his pride. "It is one continuous circumlocution because of censorship and requires a constant reading commentary," Mirsky argued. The use of Aesopic language was one reason why Saltykov-Shchedrin has never achieved as much acclaim in the West as had three of his great contemporaries, Turgenev, Dostoyevsky and Tolstoy, according to Sofia Kovalevskaya. "It is unbelievable, how well we've learned to read between the lines in Russia," the great mathematician remarked in her essay written in 1889 in Swedish. Another reason had to do with peculiarities of Saltykov's chosen genre: his credo "has always been a satire, spiced with fantasy, not far removed from Rabelais, the kind of literature that's tightly bound to its own national soil... Tears are the same wherever we go, but each nation laughs in its own way," Kovalevskaya argued.

Saltykov's style of writing, according to D.S.Mirsky, was based on the bad journalistic style of the period, which originated largely with Osip Senkovsky, and which "today invariably produces an impression of painfully elaborate vulgarity." Many other critics (Goryachkina among them) disagreed, praising the author's lively, rich language and the way he mastered both stark realism (The Golovlyov Family, Old Times in Poshekhonye) and satirical grotesque merged with fantasy. Of the writer's stylistic peculiarities biographer Sergey Krivenko (of the Narodnik movement, the one which Saltykov has always been in opposition to) wrote: "It is difficult to assess his works using the established criteria. It's a mix of a variety of genres: poetry and documentary report, epics and satire, tragedy and comedy. In the process of reading it is impossible to decide what exactly it is, but the general impression is invariably strong, as of something very lively and harmonic. Ignoring the established formats, Saltykov was driven by two things: current stream of new ideas and those lofty ideals he's been aspiring to." Saltykov, according to Krivenko, occasionally repeated himself, but never denied this, explaining it by the need of always being engaged with 'hot' issues – "things which in the course of decades were in their own right repeating themselves with such damning monotony". "There are not many writers in Rus whose very name would give that much to one's mind and heart, and who'd leave such a vast literary heritage, rich and diverse both in essence and in form, written in a very special language which even in his lifetime became known as 'saltykovian'," wrote Krivenko in 1895. "Saltykov's gift was no lesser than that of Gogol, neither in originality nor in itspower," the biographer reckoned.

Saltykov-Schedrin was a controversial figure and often found himself a target of sharp criticism, mainly for his alleged 'lack of patriotism' and negativism. He's never seen himself a promoter of the latter and often proclaimed his belief in the strength of a common man, seeing the latter as holder of principles of real democracy. In 1882, as he, feeling depressed by the critical response to his work, made rather a pessimistic assessment of his life in literature, Ivan Turgenev was quick to reassure him. "The writer who is most hated, is most loved, too. You'd have known none of this, had you remained M.E.Saltykov, a mere hereditary Russian aristocrat. But you are Saltykov-Schedrin, a writer who happened to draw a distinctive line in our literature: that's why you are either hated or loved, depending [on who reads you]. Such is the true 'outcome' of your life in literature, and you must be pleased with it."

For all his insight and taste for detail, Saltykov was never keen on examining individual characters (even if he did create memorable ones). Admittedly, he was always more concerned with things general and typical, gauging social tendencies, collective urges and what he termed 'herd instincts in a modern man', often resorting to schemes and caricatures.

In his later years Saltykov-Schedrin found himself to be a strong influence upon the radical youth of the time. In 1885–1886, Vladimir Lenin's brother Alexander and sister Anna were members of one of the numerous student's delegations that came home to visit the ailing Schedrin, latter referring to him as "the revolutionary youth's favourite writer". Saltykov-Shedrin was a personal favourite of Lenin himself, who often namechecked the writer's characters to prove his point – Iudushka, in particular, served well to label many of his adversaries: Russian old landlords and emerging capitalists, Tzarist government members and, notably, his own associate Trotzky.

== Selected works ==
=== Novels ===
- The History of a Town (История одного города, 1870)
- Ubezhishche Monrepo (Убежище Монрепо, 1879, Mon Repos Haven), not translated.
- The Golovlyov Family (Господа Головлёвы, 1880)
- Sovremennaya idilliya (Современная идиллия, 1883, Modern Idyll), not translated.
- Poshekhonskaya starina (Пошехонская старина, 1889, Old Years in Poshekhonye), not translated.

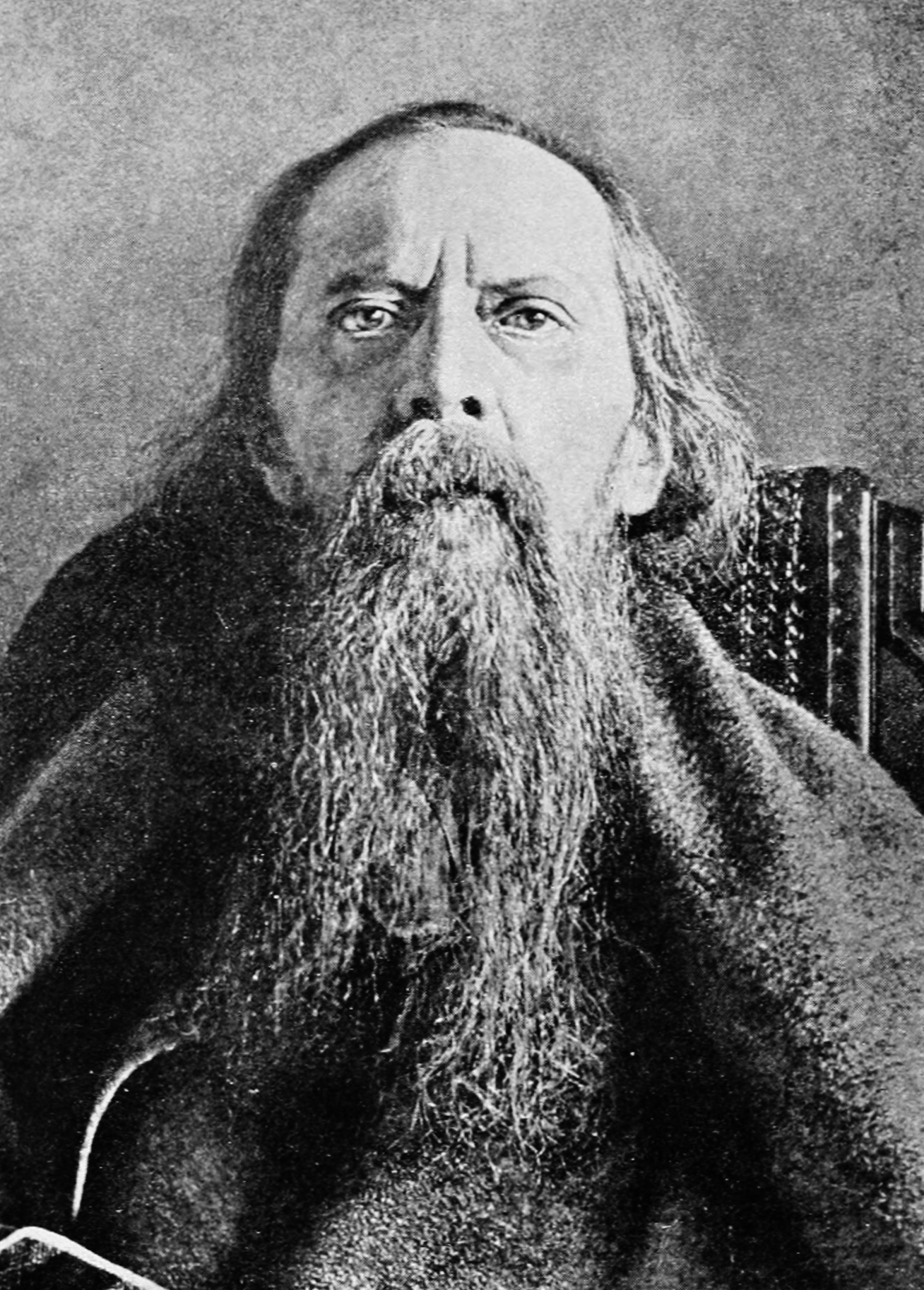
Mikhail Saltykov-Shchedrin

=== Stories and sketches ===
- Provincial Sketches (also: Tchinovnicks: Sketches Of Provincial Life, Губернские очерки, 1856)
- The Pompadours (also: Pompadours and Pompadouresses and Messieurs et Mesdames Pompadours, Помпадуры и Помпадурши, 1863–1874)

=== Other ===
- Pazukhin's Death (Смерть Пазухина, 1857, play)
- Fables (or Tales, Сказки для детей изрядного возраста, 1869–1886)
  - The Story of How a Muzhik Fed Two Generals (The How a Muzhik Fed Two Officials, Повесть о том, как один мужик двух генералов прокормил, 1869)

=== English translations ===
- The Golovlyov Family
  - The Gollovlev Family, Jarrold & Sons, 1910.
  - A Family of Noblemen (The Gentlemen Golovliov), Boni & Liveright, 1917.
  - The Golovlyov Family, Everyman's Library, J. M. Dent & Sons, 1934.
  - The Golovlovs, Signet Classics, The New American Library, 1961.
  - The Golovlyov Family, Penguin Classics, 1995. ISBN 0140444904
  - The Golovlyov Family, The Overlook Press, 2013. ISBN 146830156X
- The History of a Town
  - The History of a Town, Willem A. Meeuws, Oxford, 1980. ISBN 0902672398
  - The History of a Town, or, The Chronicle of Foolov, Ardis, 1982. ISBN 0882336118
- Fables
  - Fables by Shchedrin, Chatto and Windus, 1931.
  - Tales from M. Saltykov-Shchedrin, Foreign Languages Publishing House, Moscow, 1952.
- Pazukhin's Death
  - The Death of Pazukhin: A Play in Four Acts, Brentano's, 1924.
  - Russian Comedy of the Nikolaian Era. Pazukhin's Death: A Comedy in Four Acts, Harwood Academic Publishers, 1997. ISBN 9057020483
- Tchinovnicks: Sketches of Provincial Life (Selections from Gubernskie ocherki), 1861.
- The Village Priest and Other Stories from the Russian of Militsina & Saltikov, T. Fisher Unwin, 1918.
- The Pompadours: A Satire on the Art of Government, Ardis, 1982. ISBN 0882337432
- The Humour of Russia, London : W. Scott, 1895
- How the two Ivans quarrelled : and other Russian comic stories, Oneworld Classics, 2011.
