= The Islanders (Leskov novel) =

1866 novel by Nikolai Leskov

- 2009 edition cover
- Author: Nikolai Leskov
- Original title: Островитяне
- Language: Russian
- Subject: Arts, family drama
- Publisher: Andrey Krayevsky, Saint Petersburg
- Publication date: 1866
- Publication place: Russian Empire
- Media type: Print
- Preceded by: No Way Out (1864)
- Followed by: The Amazon (1866)

The Islanders (Ostrovityane, Островитяне) is a novel by Nikolai Leskov, first published in the November–December 1866 issues of Otechestvennye Zapiski, under the moniker M.Stebnitsky. In 1867 the novel came out as a separate edition in Saint Petersburg.

== Background ==
Leskov started working upon the novel in autumn 1865 right after the Neglected People, and finished in the early 1866. In it he started to investigate what he himself defined as "Saint Petersburg types," - this time taking as a sample the life of the two ethnic German families, the Norks and the Schultses, concentrating on the story of painter Istomin (who has the relations with Manichka Nork). The novel features Leskov's numerous commentaries upon the discussion concerning the development of fine arts that was going on in the Russian press in 1865 featuring clashes between the different sections of the Russian fine arts community, dealing mostly with the controversy surrounding the so-called "Riot of the 14" of the Imperial Academy of Arts when a group of artists, led by Ivan Kramskoi, refused to take part in the Golden medal competition as a protest against the Academy's refusal to credit the rise of the new realism in the Russian painting. The Russian press was strongly advised to ignore the theme and Leskov had to be very careful in defining his position which proved to be ambivalent: while supporting the demands for reforming the Academy (expressed by newspapers Golos and Vedomosti), he was opposing the Sovremennik and Russkoye Slovo leftist authors (whom he tagged 'theoreticians') and promoted the idea of "religious and moral mission" of fine arts.

In his 1881 letter to Alexey Suvorin Leskov regretted what he called one of his "old mistakes", namely "a certain portrait likeness" one of his Islanders novel characters had to a certain real person. Whom did he mean exactly, scholars weren't sure: some said the prototype for Istomin (bearing in mind his capriciousness, tetchiness and womanizing) could have been Karl Bryullov, others pointed to Sergey Zaryanko (1818–1870), a once promising young painter who's squandered his potential by too much commercial work.

== Critical reception ==
Contemporary critics all but ignored The Islanders, being still under the impression of No Way Out novel, almost unanimously condemned as 'reactionary'. Nikolai Mikhaylovsky in his December 1866 review published in Knizhny Vestnik, gave the novel a mere mention, referring to it as "another spicy novel by Stebnitsky".

Conservative critic Nikolai Solovyov in his 1867 essay "The Two Novelists" published by Vsemirny Trud, dismissed the novel as a failure. "In The Islanders... this author falls lower still, leaving even Mr. Pisemsky behind, from whom he learned a lot, to submerge himself into pure romanticism. Being totally ignorant, apparently, of the side of life he touches here, he sets all his teeth into this Istomin character, and so merciless and obvious this execution is that in the end one is tempted to sympathize with poor Istomin, amorphous as his figure is. In the end the author has a good sense to pity his hero, but still for the reader all this is nothing but comedy, or at least some kind of a fantasy, having nothing to do with the real life."
