= Neglected People =

1865 novel by Nikolai Leskov

- Author: Nikolai Leskov
- Original title: Обойдённые
- Language: Russian
- Subject: Arts, politics, family dramas
- Publisher: Andrey Krayevsky, Saint Petersburg
- Publication date: 1865
- Publication place: Russian Empire
- Media type: Print
- Preceded by: No Way Out (1864)
- Followed by: The Amazon (1866)

Neglected People (Russian: Обойдённые, romanized: Oboydyonnye) is an 1865 novel by Nikolai Leskov.

== History ==
The novel, initially supposed to be published in Fyodor Dostoyevsky's Epokh magazine, eventually came out in Otechestvennye Zapiski (1865, Nos. 18-24). In 1866 it was released as a separate book by Andrey Krayevsky's publishing agency in Saint Petersburg.

== Background ==
According to the author the novel was written in Paris where Leskov was sent as a Severnaya Ptchela correspondent in 1862. Later it was suggested that parts 2 and 3 of it might have been finished in St. Petersburg in early 1865, judging by the references to the local literary journals' repertoire of the time. Originally the novel had a different title. On March 6, 1865, Leskov informed Nikolai Strakhov in a letter: "I've got a large story, a novel almost - nothing tendentious, very distinct, - and it is called Vsyak svoyemy nravu rabotayet (Everybody Acts According to their Taste)".

The novel is partly autobiographical. Details of Leskov's life in Paris are there, as well as his memories of childhood in Kiev and an unhappy marriage, his ex-wife Olga Smirnova obviously serving as a prototype for Dolinsky's wife. Despite Leskov's assurances to the contrary, the novel continued his anti-nihilistic crusade, featuring 'nihilists' Vyrvich and Shpandorchuk. Anna Mikhaylovna's workshop resembles Chernyshevsky's Vera Pavlovna's enterprise in What Is to Be Done?.

Neglected People opened the series of Leskov's novels and shorts stories concerning the arts and artists (The Islanders, "The Toupee Artist", The Devil's Dolls). The author's favorite artists Murillo and Girodet de Roussy-Trioson's art serves here as a background for the characters' emotional condition. One of the latter, artist Zhuravka, described as "a little man with big heart," formulates his views on the mission of arts in his disputes with nihilists Vyrvich and Shpandortchuk. It's through Zhuravka's eye that the reader sees the love triangle of Dolinsky, Anna Mikhaylovna and Dora.
