= A Decayed Family =

Unfinished novel by Nikolai Leskov

- Author: Nikolai Leskov
- Original title: Захудалый род
- Language: Russian
- Genre: Romantic chronicles
- Publisher: The Russian Messenger
- Publication date: 1874
- Publication place: Russia
- Media type: Print (Paperback & Hardback)

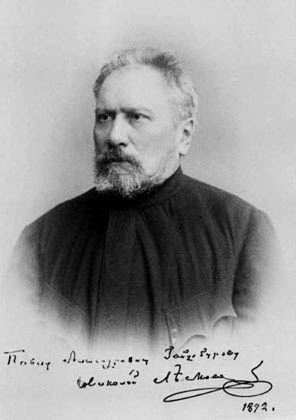
Nikolai Leskov

A Decayed Family (Russian: Захуда′лый род, romanized: Zakhudaly rod) is an unfinished novel by Nikolai Leskov, subtitled "The Family Chronicles of Princes Protazanov" (Семейная хроника князей Протозановых). Parts one and two of it were first published in the 1874 Nos. 7, 8 and 10 of The Russian Messenger as part of a trilogy which also included Old Years in Plodomasovo (1869) and The Cathedral Clergy (1872).

== History ==
The publication of the novel led to Leskov's severing all ties with The Russian Messenger. The main issue was the magazine's editor-in-chief Mikhail Katkov's disagreement with the author's position as regards Russian dvoryanstvo. At the time of the publication Katkov (while praising the novel's artistic qualities) told the members of the magazine's stuff: "We've made a mistake, this is not our man, has nothing to do with us, [his departure is] not something to be pitied." Outraged by editorial cuts, Leskov decided against starting upon the third part of the novel, leaving it unfinished.

Leskov himself rated A Decayed Family higher than The Cathedral Clergy and The Sealed Angel, referring to it as his "most mature work". The publication in the magazine of parts 1 and 2 received high praise from Ivan Aksakov and Nikolay Pirogov.

In 1875 A Decayed Family came out as a separate edition. "Here its second part is presented in my own version, not that of Katkov," Leskov wrote in a letter to Ivan Aksakov on March 23, 1875. As The Complete Leskov started to be published by Alexey Suvorin's publishing house, A Decayed Family was included into the Volume 6, which also featured Leskov's most radical anti-clerical essays and stories. On July 16, 1889, Leskov received the news that the whole issue of Volume 6 had been arrested by the police, which led to his first major heart attack. In July 1890 Volume 6 came out in the alternative version, A Decayed Family included.
