= The Enchanted Wanderer =

1873 novella by Nikolai Leskov

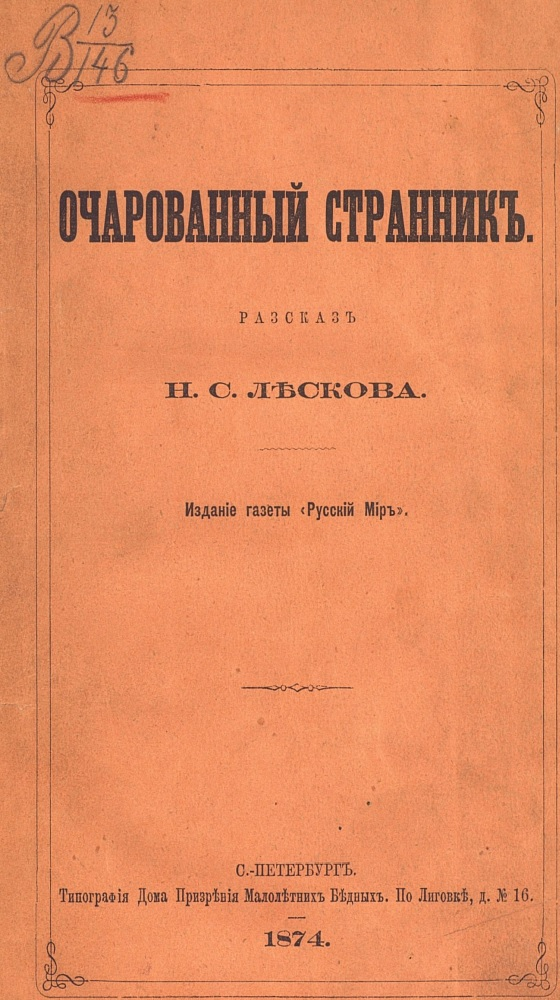
- Author: Nikolai Leskov
- Original title: Очарованный странник
- Language: Russian
- Publisher: Russkiy Mir
- Publication date: 1873
- Publication place: Russian Empire

The Enchanted Wanderer (Очарованный странник) is a skaz-based novel by Nikolai Leskov, first published in Russkiy Mir newspaper in 1873. The protagonist is a Russian wanderer.

== Background ==
The original idea for the story came to Leskov after he visited Lake Ladoga and the Valaam Monastery in 1872 . In January Leskov sent the first version of the story, entitled Black Earth Telemachus (Черноземный Телемак) to The Russian Messenger, but Mikhail Katkov rejected it. In March Leskov sent the manuscript to Fyodor Dostoyevsky's Grazhdanin magazine, again to no avail. According to N.A. Lyubimov of The Russian Messenger, "Apart from some episodes, with Filaret and Saint Sergius, the whole thing appeared to [Katkov] more like a rough bulk of material for some future working upon… rather than the finished work, describing something real." As critic Boris Bukhstab later remarked, the story could have been construed as aimed against dvoryanstvo, weak and 'unmanly', according to the protagonist. This could have particularly upset Katkov, who had had disputes with Leskov previously, on that particular matter.

=== Dedication ===
The original version of The Enchanted Wanderer came out with a dedication to Sergey Egorovich Kushelev, an infantry general, close to the Russian Court, and Leskov's friend. "In the Autumn of 1872 as I've written The Sealed Angel… Adjutant-General Sergey Egorovich Kushelev visited me, asking for a manuscript to be taken to the Court so that Empress consort Maria Aleksanrovna could read it. This started my friendship with several houses which at the time regarded beau monde, particularly the Kushelev house where I've been received as a friend. There I met a lot of interesting people," Leskov remembered.

== Synopsis ==
The novel doesn't have a coherent plot. It consists of various 20 chapters, the first one being a kind of introduction, the remaining chapters present independent episodes of Flyagin's life, told by him to strangers he met.

The protagonist, Ivan Flyagin, has been "promised to God" by his mother but refused to join the monastery as a young man, ignoring all the "signs", allegedly pointing him the way. The rest of his life, full of wandering, he sees as a "punishment" for this, and eventually he becomes a monk.

== Reception ==
Contemporary critics' reaction was generally lukewarm. Narodnik Nikolay Mikhaylovsky in 1895, re-assessing the whole of Leskov's legacy, wrote: "In terms of fabula richness it might have been Leskov's most significant work, but total lack of focus is more than obvious so there is no fabula as such, rather a set of fabulas, strung together, so that any bead could be removed and replaced by another, and any number of other beads could be put onto the same string."

Later critics praised The Enchanted Wanderer as one of Leskov's masterpieces where, according to D.S. Mirsky, the author used his unique gift of a storyteller to the fullest effect.

== English translations ==
- A. G. Paschkoff (1924)
- David Magarshack (1946)
- George H. Hanna (1958)
- Ian Dreiblatt (Melville House, 2012)
- Richard Pevear and Larissa Volokhonsky (2013)
- Donald Rayfield (2020)

== Adaptations ==
- 2002: The Enchanted Wanderer (opera), opera by Rodion Shchedrin
- 1990: The Enchanted Wanderer (1990 film), Soviet film
- 1960: The Enchanted Wanderer (1960 film), Soviet film
