= Anti-nihilistic novel =

Form of novel from late 19th-century Russian literature

An anti-nihilistic novel (Note: In Russian: антинигилистический роман (antinigilisticheskiy roman), from нигилизм (nigilizm) meaning 'nihilism'.) is a form of novel from late 19th-century Russian literature, that came as a result of the disillusionment in the Russian nihilist movement and revolutionary socialism of the 1860s and 1870s. The genre was influential in shaping subsequent ideas on nihilism as a philosophy and cultural phenomenon. Its name derives from the historical usage of the word nihilism as broadly applied to revolutionary movements within the Russian Empire at the time.

In the more formulaic works of this genre, the typical protagonist is a nihilist student. In contrast to the Chernyshevskian character of Rakhmetov however, the nihilist is weak-willed and is easily seduced into subversive activities by a villain, often a Pole (in reference to Polish nationalist insurrectionary efforts against the Russian Empire). (Note: See: Polish insurrection of 1830–31, and Polish insurrection of 1863.) The more meritous works of this genre managed to explore nihilism with less caricature. Many anti-nihilistic novels were published in the conservative literary magazine The Russian Messenger edited by Mikhail Katkov.

== Background ==
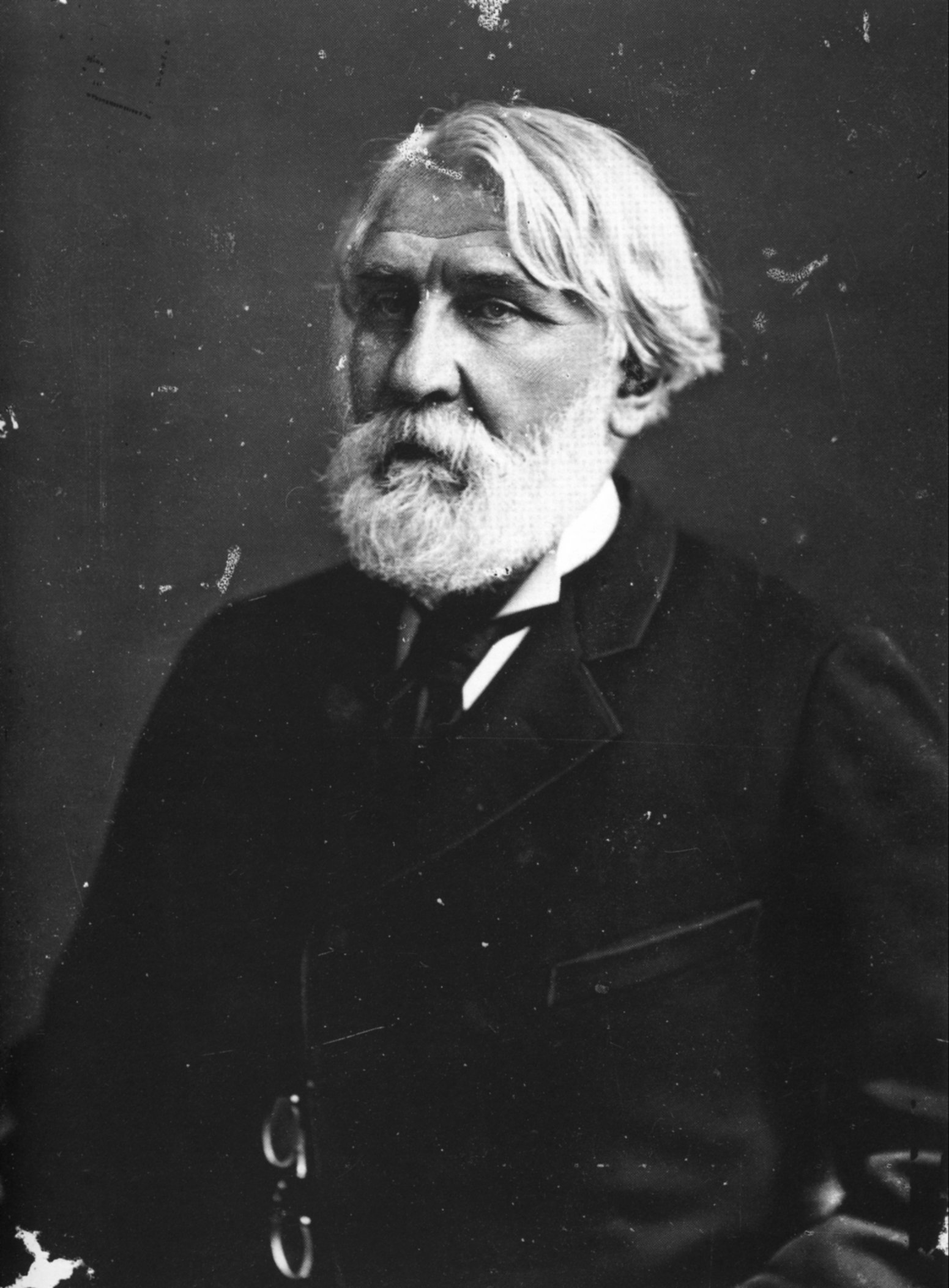
Ivan Turgenev, who first popularized the term "nihilism" in his 1862 novel Fathers and Sons

From the period 1860–1917, Russian nihilism was both a nascent form of nihilist philosophy and broad cultural movement which overlapped with certain revolutionary tendencies of the era, for which it was often wrongly characterized as a form of political terrorism. Russian nihilism centered on the dissolution of existing values and ideals, incorporating theories of hard determinism, atheism, materialism, positivism, and rational egoism, while rejecting metaphysics, sentimentalism, and aestheticism. Leading philosophers of this school of thought included Nikolay Chernyshevsky and Dmitry Pisarev.

== List of anti-nihilistic novels ==
- Fathers and Sons (1862) by Ivan Turgenev
- Vzbalamuchennoye more (1863) by Aleksey Pisemsky
- Oboydyonnye (1863) by Nikolai Leskov
- No Way Out (1864) by Nikolai Leskov
- Marevo (1864) by Viktor Klyushnikov
- Notes from Underground (1864) by Fyodor Dostoevsky
- Sovremennaya Idilliya (1865) by Vasily Avenarius
- Crime and Punishment (1866) by Fyodor Dostoevsky
- Povetriye (1867) by Vasily Avenarius
- Panurgovo Stado (1869) by Vsevolod Krestovsky
- The Idiot (1869) by Fyodor Dostoevsky
- Na Nozhakh (1870) by Nikolai Leskov
- In the Whirlpool (1871) by Alexey Pisemsky
- The Cathedral Folk (1872) by Nikolai Leskov
- Demons (1871) by Fyodor Dostoevsky
- Dve Sily (1874) by Vsevolod Krestovsky
- The Brothers Karamazov (1880) by Fyodor Dostoevsky

== See also ==
- Existentialism
- Superfluous man
- Themes in Fyodor Dostoevsky's writings

== Sources ==
- Pratt, Alan. "Nihilism". Internet Encyclopedia of Philosophy.
