= Anti-nihilism =

Anti-nihilism may refer to:

- An opposition to the philosophy of nihilism
  - Trivialism, the theory of logic that all propositions are true
- Anti-nihilistic novel, a genre of 19th century Russian literature
