= Nikolai Leskov =

Russian writer and novelist (1831–1895)

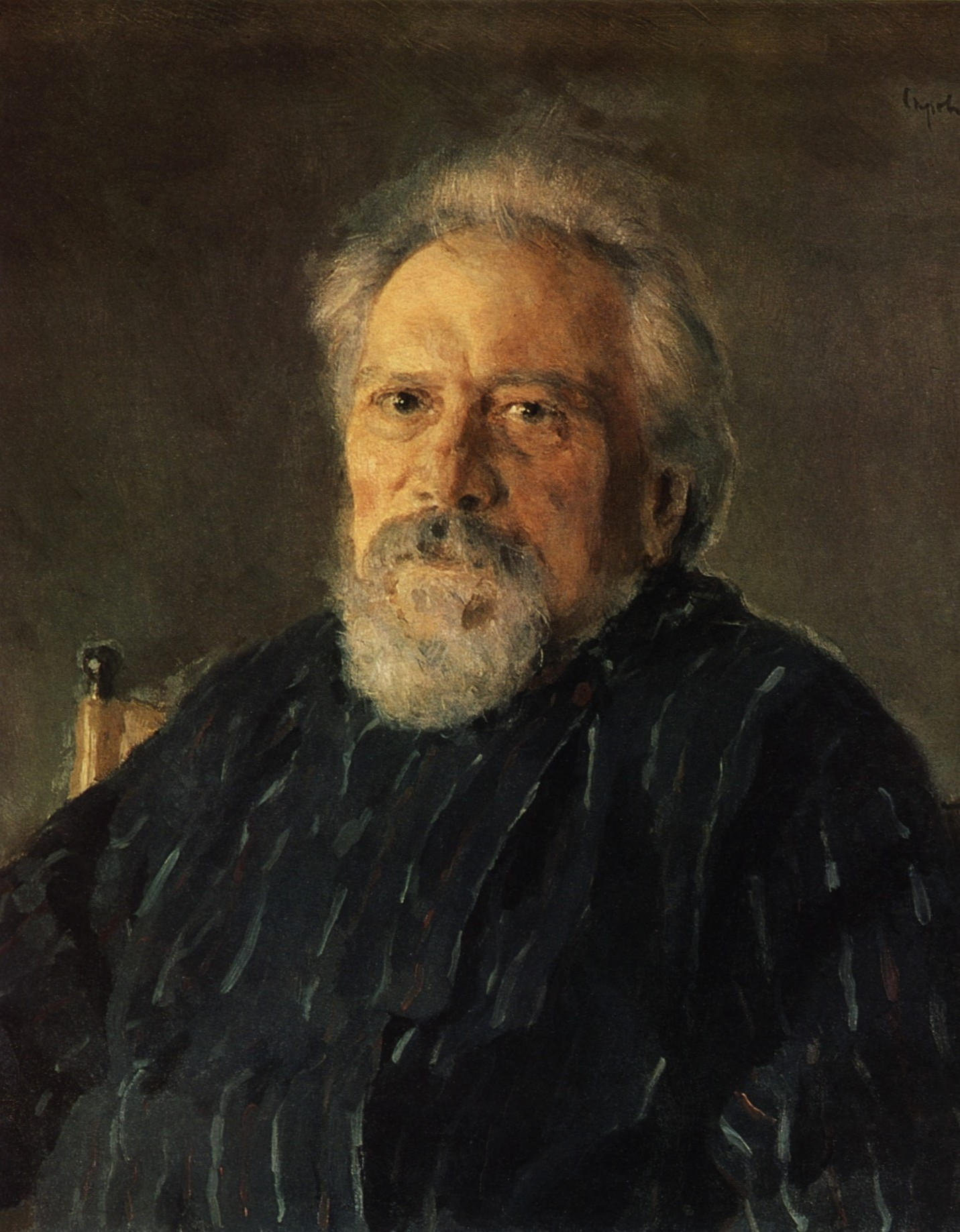
- Portrait of Leskov by Valentin Serov, 1894
- Born: Nikolai Semyonovich Leskov; 16 February 1831; Gorokhovo, Oryol Gubernia, Russian Empire
- Died: 5 March 1895 (aged 64); St. Petersburg, Russian Empire
- Resting place: Literatorskiye Mostki, St. Petersburg
- Occupations: Novelist, short story writer, skaz writer, journalist, playwright
- Spouse: Olga Vasilievna Smirnova (1831–1909)
- Partner: Ekaterina Bubnova (née Savitskaya)
- Children: Vera Leskova; Vera Bubnova-Leskova (adopted), Andrey; Varya Dolina (aka Varya Cook, adopted)
- Writing career
- Pen name: M. Stebnitsky
- Language: Russian
- Period: 1862–95
- Notable works: Lady Macbeth of Mtsensk; The Cathedral Folk; The Enchanted Wanderer "The Steel Flea"
- Movement: Realism

Nikolai Semyonovich Leskov (Russian: Никола́й Семёнович Леско́в; 16 February [O.S. 4 February] 1831 – 5 March [O.S. 21 February] 1895) was a Russian novelist, short-story writer, playwright, and journalist, who also wrote under the pseudonym M. Stebnitsky. Praised for his unique writing style and innovative experiments in form, and held in high esteem by Leo Tolstoy, Anton Chekhov and Maxim Gorky among others, Leskov is credited with creating a comprehensive picture of contemporary Russian society using mostly short literary forms. His major works include Lady Macbeth of Mtsensk (1865), which was later made into an opera by Shostakovich; The Cathedral Folk (1872); The Enchanted Wanderer (1873); and "The Tale of Cross-eyed Lefty from Tula and the Steel Flea" (1881).

Leskov received his formal education at the Oryol Lyceum. In 1847 Leskov joined the Oryol criminal court office, later transferring to Kyiv, where he worked as a clerk, attended university lectures, mixed with local people, and took part in various student circles. In 1857 Leskov quit his job as a clerk and went to work for the private trading company Scott & Wilkins owned by Alexander Scott, his aunt's Scottish husband.

His literary career began in the early 1860s with the publication of his short story The Extinguished Flame (1862), and his novellas Musk-Ox (May 1863) and The Life of a Peasant Woman (September, 1863). His first novel No Way Out was published under the pseudonym M. Stebnitsky in 1864. From the mid-1860s to the mid-1880s Leskov published a wide range of works, including journalism, sketches, short stories, and novels. Leskov's major works, many of which continue to be published in modern versions, were written during this time. A number of his later works were banned because of their satirical treatment of the Russian Orthodox Church and its functionaries. Leskov died on 5 March 1895, aged 64, and was interred in the Volkovo Cemetery in Saint Petersburg, in the section reserved for literary figures.

== Biography ==
=== Early life ===
Nikolai Semyonovich Leskov was born on 4 February 1831, in Gorokhovo, Oryol Gubernia, to Semyon Dmitrievich Leskov (1789–1848), a respected criminal investigator and local court official, and Maria Petrovna Leskova (née Alferyeva; 1813–1886), the daughter of an impoverished Moscow nobleman, who first met her future husband at a very young age, when he worked as a tutor in their house. Leskov's ancestors on his father's side were all clergymen in the village of Leska in Oryol Gubernia, hence the name Leskov. Semyon Dmitrievich was a well-educated man; friends referred to him as a "homegrown intellectual". One of Nikolai's aunts on his mother's side was married to a rich Oryol landlord named Strakhov who owned the village of Gorokhovo ("a beautiful, wealthy and well-groomed estate... where the hosts lived in luxury," according to Leskov). Another was the wife of an Englishman, the chief steward for several local estates and a large trade company owner. Leskov spent his first eight years in Gorokhovo, where his grandmother lived and where his mother was only an occasional guest. He acquired his early education in the house of Strakhov, who employed tutors from Germany and France for his own children. As the German teacher started to praise Leskov for his gifts, his life became difficult, due to the jealousy of his hosts. At his grandmother's request, his father took Nikolai back to Oryol where he settled in the family house at 3 Dvoryanskaya Street.

In 1839 Semyon Leskov lost his job through a row and intrigue, having brought upon himself the wrath of the governor himself. "So we left our house in Oryol, sold what we had in the city and bought a village with 50 peasants in the Kromy region from general A. I. Krivtsov. The purchase was made mostly on credit, for mother was still hoping to get her five thousand off of Strakhov which never came. The tiny village father had bought was eventually sold for debts," Leskov later remembered. What the Leskovs, with their three sons and two daughters, were left with was a small Panin khutor, one very poor house, a watermill, a garden, two peasants' houses and 40 dessiatins of land. This is where Nikolai had his first experiences with oral folklore and the 'earthy' Russian dialecticisms he would later become famous for reviving in his literary work.

In August 1841 Leskov began his formal education at the Oryol Lyceum. After five years of poor progress all he could manage was a two-year graduation certificate. Later, scholar B. Bukhstab, comparing Leskov's school failures with those of Nikolay Nekrasov who had had similar problems, argued that, "...apparently, in both cases the reasons were – on the one hand, the lack of a guiding hand, on the other – [both young men's] loathing for the tiresome cramming routine and the deadly dumbness of state education, both having lively temperaments and an eagerness to learn more of real life".

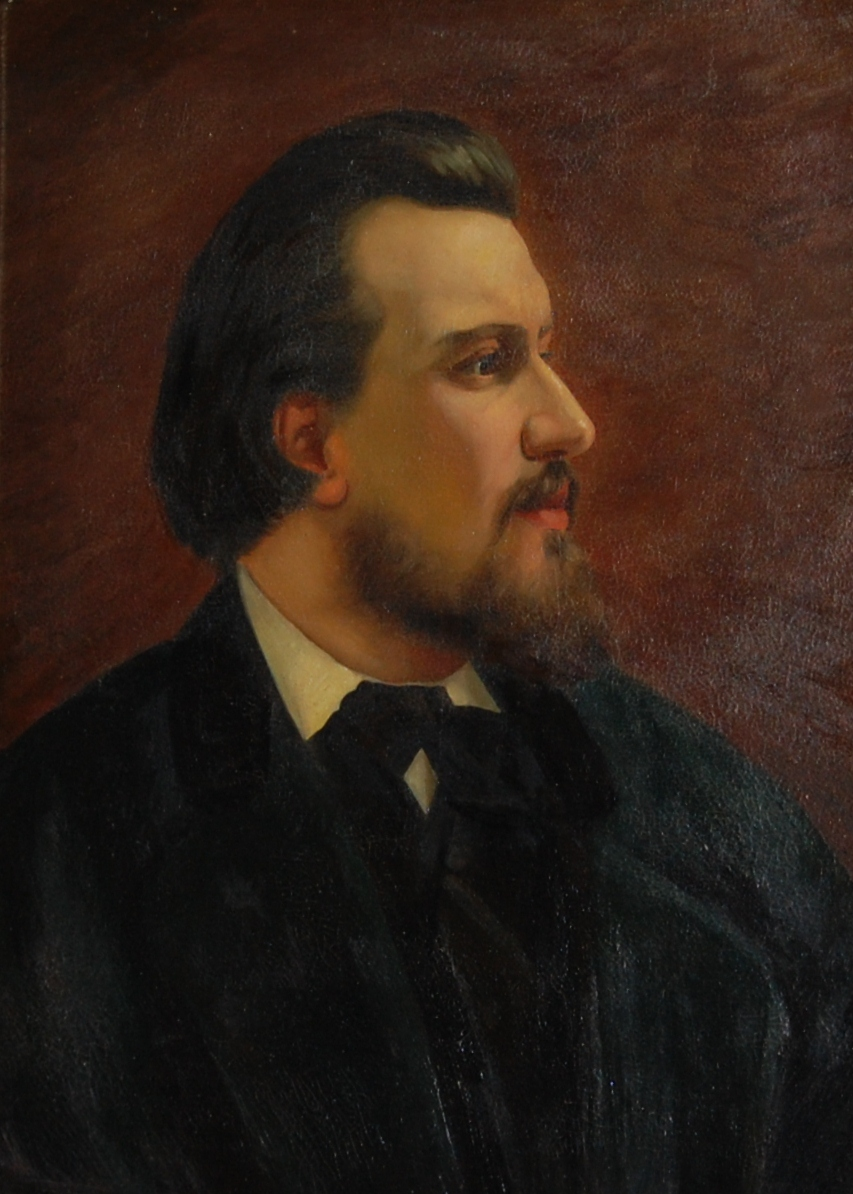
The owners of the business I found myself in were all English, had no experience of Russian life whatsoever, and were squandering the capital they'd brought with them in the most optimistic manner. Nikolai Leskov on Scott & Wilkins.

In June 1847 Leskov joined the Oryol criminal court office, where Semyon Dmitrievich had once worked. In May 1848 Leskov's family's property was destroyed by a fire. In July of the same year Leskov's father died from cholera. In December 1849 Leskov asked his superiors for a transfer to Kiev, where he joined the local government treasury chamber as an assistant clerk and settled with his maternal uncle, S. P. Alferyev, a professor of medicine.

In Kiev he attended lectures at the university as an auditor student, studied the Polish and Ukrainian languages and the art of icon-painting, took part in the religious and philosophical circles of the students, and met pilgrims, sectarians and religious dissenters. Dmitry Zhuravsky, an economist and critic of serfdom in Russia, was said to be one of his major influences. In 1853 Leskov married Olga Smirnova; they had one son, Dmitry (who died after only a year), and a daughter, Vera.

In 1857 Leskov quit his job in the office and joined the private trading company Scott & Wilkins (Шкотт и Вилькенс) owned by Alexander Scott, his aunt Polly's Scottish husband. Later he wrote of this in one of his short autobiographical sketches: "Soon after the Crimean War I was infected with a then popular heresy, something I've been reproaching myself for since. I abandoned the state official career which seemed to be starting promisingly and joined one of the newly-born trade companies."

In May 1857 Leskov moved with his family to Raiskoye village in Penza Governorate where the Scotts were based, and later that month embarked upon his first business trip, involving the transportation of the Oryol-based serfs of Count Perovsky to the Southern Russian steppes, not entirely successfully, as he later described in his autobiographical short story "The Product of Nature". While working for this company, which, in Leskov's words, "was eager to exploit whatever the region could provide," he derived valuable experience, making him an expert in numerous branches of industry and agriculture. The firm employed him as an agent envoy; while travelling through the remote regions of Russia, the young man learned local dialects and became keenly interested in the customs and ways of the different ethnic and regional groups of Russian peoples. Years later, when asked what the source of the endless stream of stories that seemed to pour out of him ceaselessly was, Leskov said, pointing at his forehead: "From this trunk. Here pictures from the six or seven years of my commercial career are being kept, from the times when I travelled across Russia on business trips. Those were the best years of my life. I saw a lot and life was easy for me."

In Russian Society in Paris he wrote: "I think I know the Russian man down to the very bottom of his nature but I give myself no credit for that. It's just that I've never tried to investigate the 'people's ways' by having conversations with Petersburg's cabmen. I just grew up among common people." Up until 1860 Leskov resided with members of his family (and that of Alexander Scott) in Raisky, Penza Governorate. In the summer of 1860, when Scott & Wilkins closed, he returned to Kiev to work there as a journalist for a while, then in the end of the year moved to Saint Petersburg.

=== Journalism ===
Leskov began writing in the late 1850s, making detailed reports to the directors of Scott & Wilkins, and recounting his meetings and contracts in personal letters to Scott. The latter, marveling at his business partner's obvious literary gift, showed them to writer Ilya Selivanov who found these pieces "worthy of publication". Leskov considered his long essay "Sketches on Wine Industry Issues", written in 1860 about the 1859 anti-alcohol riots and first published in a local Odessa newspaper, then in Otechestvennye Zapiski (April 1861), to be his proper literary debut.

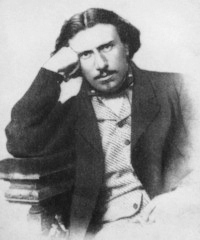
Leskov had never identified himself with any party and had to take the consequences. (D. S. Mirsky)

In May 1860 he returned with his family to Kiev, and in the summer started to write for both the Sankt-Peterburgskye Vedomosty newspaper and the Kiev-based Sovremennaya Meditsina (where he published his article "On the Working Class", and several essays on medical issues) and the Ukazatel Ekonomitchesky (Economic Guide). His series of October 1860 articles on corruption in the sphere of police medicine ("Some Words on the Police Medics in Russia") led to confrontations with colleagues and his being fired from Sovremennaya Meditsina. In 1860 his articles started to appear regularly in the Saint Petersburg-based paper Otechestvennye Zapiski where he found a friend and mentor in the Oryol-born publicist S. S. Gromeko.

In January 1861 Leskov moved to Saint Peterburg where he stayed at Professor Ivan Vernadsky's along with Zemlya i volya member Andrey Nechiporenko and met Taras Shevchenko. For a short while he moved to Moscow and started to work for the Russkaya Retch newspaper, all the while contributing to Otechestvennye Zapiski. In December he left Russkaya Retch (for personal, rather than ideological reasons) and moved back to Saint Peterburg where in January 1862 he joined the staff of the Northern Bee (Severnaya ptchela), a liberal newspaper edited by Pavel Usov. There Leskov met journalist Arthur Benni, a Polish-born British citizen, with whom he forged a great friendship and later came to defend, as leftist radicals in Petersburg started to spread rumours about his being "an English spy" and having links with the 3rd Department. For Severnaya ptchela Leskov (now writing as M. Stebnitsky, a pseudonym he used in 1862–1869) became the head of the domestic affairs department, writing sketches and articles on every possible aspect of everyday life, and also critical pieces, targeting what was termed nihilism and "vulgar materialism". He had some support at the time, from several prominent journalists, among them Grigory Eliseev, who wrote in the April 1862, Sovremennik issue: "Those lead columns in Ptchela make one pity the potential that is being spent there, still unrealised elsewhere." At a time of intense public excitement, as D. S. Mirsky pointed out, Leskov was "absorbed by the public interest as much as anyone, but his eminently practical mind and training made it impossible for him to join unreservedly any of the very impractical and hot-headed parties of the day. Hence his isolation when, in the spring of 1862, an incident occurred that had a lasting effect on his career."

On 30 May 1862, Severnaya Ptchela published an article by Nikolaj Leskov on the issue of the fires that started on 24 May, lasting for six days and destroying a large part of the Apraksin and Schukin quarters of the Russian capital, which popular rumour imputed to a group of "revolutionary students and Poles" that stood behind the "Young Russia" proclamation. Without supporting the rumour, the author demanded that the authorities should come up with a definitive statement which would either confirm or confute those allegations. The radical press construed this as being aimed at inciting the common people against the students and instigating police repressions. On the other hand, the authorities were unhappy too, for the article implied that they were doing little to prevent the atrocities. The author's suggestion that "firemen sent to the sites would do anything rather than idly stand by" angered Alexander II himself, who reportedly said: "This shouldn't have been allowed, this is a lie."

Frightened, Severnaya Ptchela sent its controversial author on a trip to Paris as a correspondent, making sure the mission was a long onе. After visiting Wilno, Grodno and Belostok, in November 1862 Leskov arrived in Prague where he met a group of Czech writers, notably Martin Brodsky, whose arabesque You Don't Cause Pain he translated. In December Leskov was in Paris, where he translated Božena Němcová's Twelve Months (A Slavic Fairytale), both translations were published by Severnaya ptchela in 1863. On his return to Russia in 1863 Leskov published several essays and letters, documenting his trip.

== Literary career ==
=== Debut ===
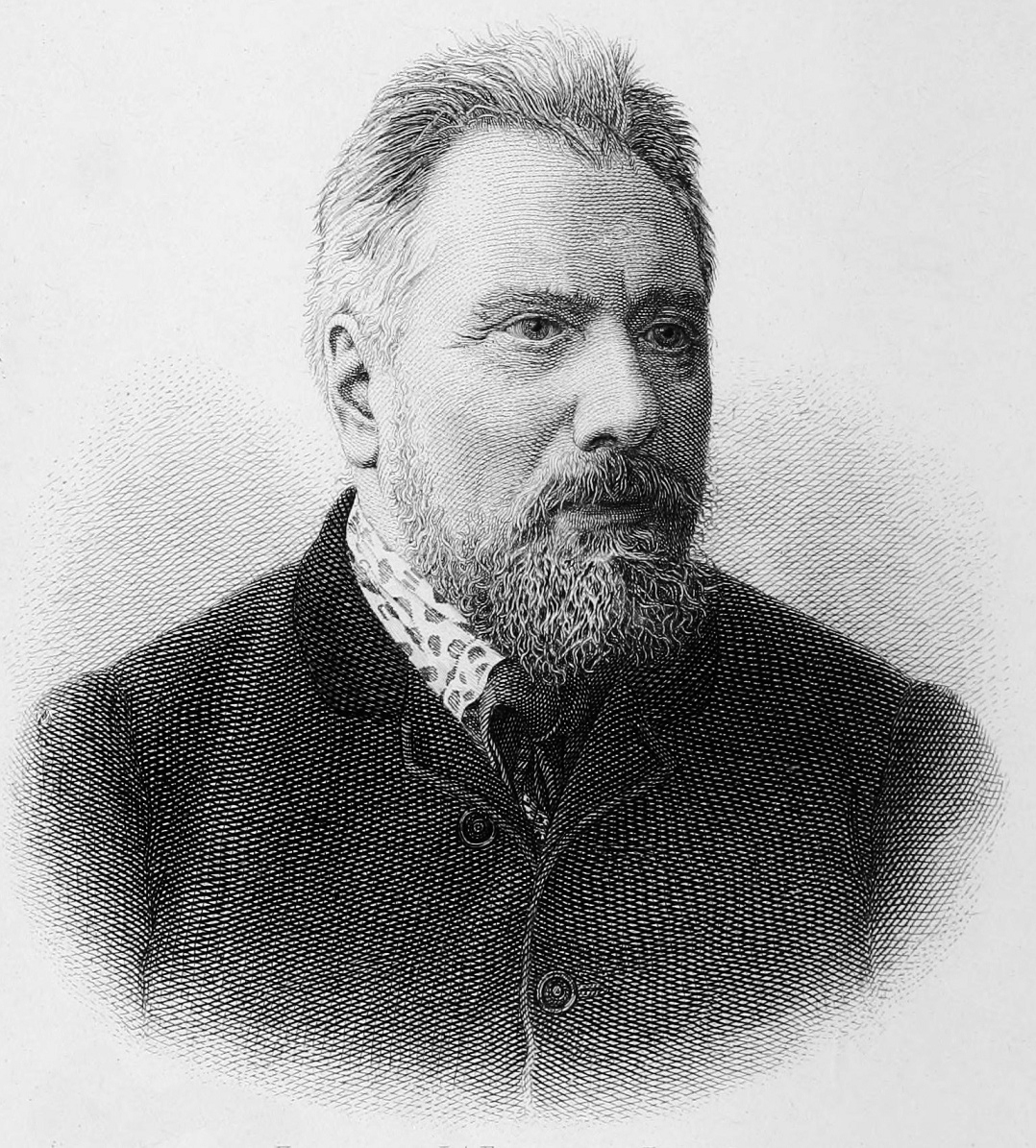
Engraving of Leskov

1862 saw the launch of Leskov's literary career, with the publication of "The Extinguished Flame" (later re-issued as "The Drought") in the March issue of Vek magazine, edited by Grigory Eliseev, followed by the short novels Musk-Ox (May 1863) and The Life of a Peasant Woman (September, 1863). In August the compilation Three stories by M. Stebnitsky came out. Another trip, to Riga in summer, resulted in a report on the Old Believers community there, which was published as a brochure at the end of the year.

In February 1864 Biblioteka Dlya Chteniya magazine began serially publishing his debut novel No Way Out (the April and May issues of the magazine, stopped by the censors, came out in June). The novel bore "every sign of haste and literary incompetence," as its author later admitted, but proved to be a powerful debut in its own way. No Way Out, which satirized nihilist communes on the one hand and praised the virtues of the common people and the powers of Christian values on the other, scandalized critics of the radical left who discovered that for most of the characters real life prototypes could be found, and its central figure, Beloyartsev, was obviously a caricature of author and social activist Vasily Sleptsov. All this seemed to confirm the view, now firmly rooted in the Russian literary community, that Leskov was a right-wing, 'reactionary' author. In April Dmitry Pisarev wrote in his review "A Walk In the Garden of Russian Literature" (Russkoye Slovo, 1865, No.3): "Can any other magazine be found anywhere in Russia, besides The Russian Messenger, that would venture to publish anything written by and signed as, Stebnitsky? Could one single honest writer be found in Russia who would be so careless, so indifferent regarding his reputation, as to contribute to a magazine that adorns itself with novels and novellas by Stebnitsky?" The social democrat-controlled press started spreading rumours that No Way Out had been 'commissioned' by the Interior Ministry's 3rd Department. What Leskov condemned as "a vicious libel" caused great harm to his career: popular journals boycotted him, while Mikhail Katkov of the conservative The Russian Messenger greeted him as a political ally.

=== Major works ===
Leskov's novel, Lady Macbeth of the Mtsensk District (written in Kiev in November 1864 and published in Dostoevsky's Epoch magazine in January 1865) and his novella The Amazon (Otechestvennye zapiski, No.7, 1866), both "pictures of almost unrelieved wickedness and passion", were ignored by contemporary critics but were praised decades later as masterpieces, containing powerful depictions of highly expressive female characters from different classes and walks of life. Both, marked by a peculiar "Leskovian" sense of humour, were written in the skaz manner, a unique folk-ish style of writing, of which Leskov, along with Gogol, was later declared an originator. Two more novellas came out at this time: Neglected People (Oboydyonnye; Otechestvennye Zapiski, 1865) which targeted Chernyshevsky's novel What's to Be Done?, and The Islanders (1866), about the everyday life of Vasilyevsky Island's German community. It was in these years that Leskov debuted as a dramatist. The Spendthrift (Rastratchik), published by Literaturnaya biblioteka in May 1867, was staged first at the Alexandrinsky Theatre (as a benefit for actress E. Levkeeva), then in December at Moscow's Maly Theater (with E. Chumakovskaya in the lead). The play was poorly received for "conveying pessimism and asocial tendencies." All the while Leskov was working as a critic: his six-part series of essays on the St. Petersburg Drama Theater was completed in December 1867. In February 1868 Stories by M.Stebnitsky (Volume 1) came out in Saint Petersburg to be followed by Volume 2 in April; both were criticized by the leftist press, Mikhail Saltykov-Shchedrin in particular.

In 1870 Leskov published the novel At Daggers Drawn, another attack aimed at the nihilist movement which, as the author saw it, was quickly merging with the Russian criminal community. Leskov's "political" novels (according to Mirsky) were not among his masterpieces, but they were enough to turn him into "a bogey figure for all the radicals in literature and made it impossible for any of the influential critics to treat him with even a modicum of objectivity." Leskov would later refer to the novel as a failure and blamed Katkov's incessant interference for it. "His was the publication in which literary qualities were being methodically repressed, destroyed, or applied to serve specific interests which had nothing to do with literature," he later insisted. Some of his colleagues (Dostoevsky among them) criticized the novel from the technical point of view, speaking of the stiltedness of the "adventure" plot and the improbability of some of its characters.

The short novel Laughter and Grief (Sovremennaya letopis, March–May, 1871), a strong social critique focusing on the fantastic disorganization and incivility of Russian life and commenting on the sufferings of individuals in a repressive society proved to be his last; from then on Leskov avoided the genre of the orthodox novel. In November 1872, though, he adapted Victor Hugo's Toilers of the Sea for children. Five years later Józef Ignacy Kraszewski's The Favourites of King August came out, translated from the Polish and edited by Leskov.

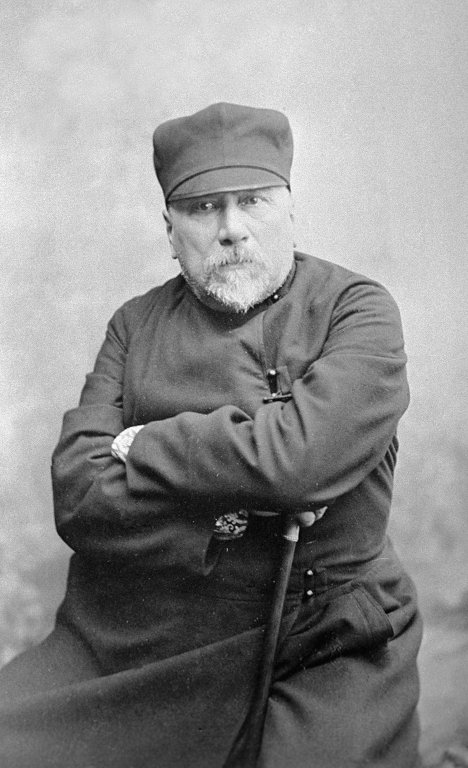
Leskov c1880s

The Cathedral Folk (Soboryane), published in 1872, is a compilation of stories and sketches which form an intricate tapestry of thinly drawn plotlines. It was seen as a turning point in the author's career; a departure from political negativism. According to Maxim Gorky, after Daggers, his "evil novel", Leskov's "craft became more of a literary icon-painting: he began to create a gallery of saints for the Russian iconostases." Leskov's miscellaneous sketches on the lives and tribulations of the Russian small-scale priesthood and rural nobility gradually gravitated (according to critic V. Korovin) into a cohesive, albeit frameless tapestry of a battlefield where "good men" (Tuberozov, Desnitsyn, Benefaktov, all of them priests) were fighting off a bunch of crooks and scoundrels; nihilists and officials. Soboryane, published by The Russian Messenger in 1872, had for its major theme the intrinsic, unbridgeable gap between the "down to earth", Christianity of the people and the official, state-sponsored corrupt version; it riled both the state and church authorities, was widely debated and had great resonance. In the summer of 1872 Leskov travelled to Karelia and visited the Valaam monastery in Lake Ladoga; the result of this trip was his Monastic Isles cycle of essays published in Russky mir in 1873. In October 1872 another collection, Small Belle-lettres Works by Leskov-Stebnitsky came out. These were the months of his short-lived friendship with Aleksey Pisemsky; Leskov greatly praised his novel In the Vortex and in August 1872 visited Pisemsky in Moscow.

At the same time, Leskov was working on two of his "Stargorod Chronicles", later regarded as part of a trilogy, along with The Cathedral Folk, Old Years in Plodomasovo (1869) and A Decayed Family (1873), each featuring a strong female character: virtuous, courageous, noble and "reasonably humane". Both works bore signs of being unfinished. It later transpired that the second work was ill-received by Mikhail Katkov, and that Leskov, having lost all interest, simply refused to complete what otherwise might have been developed into a full-blown novel. Both chronicles were thinly veiled satires on certain aspects of the Orthodox church, especially those incongruities it had with intrinsic Christian values which had made it impossible (according to the author) for the latter to take root firmly in the Russian soil. On 16 November 1874, Leskov wrote to Ivan Aksakov: "The second part of A Decayed Family which appeared in god-awful shape, became the last straw for me." It was in the course of the publication of this second part that Katkov told one of his associates, Voskoboynikov: "We've made a mistake: this man is not one of us."

In 1873 The Sealed Angel came out, about a miracle which caused an Old Believer community to return to the Orthodox fold. Influenced by traditional folk tales, it is regarded in retrospect one of Leskov's finest works, employing his skaz technique to the fullest effect. The Sealed Angel turned out to be the only story that avoided being heavily cut by The Russian Messenger because, as Leskov later wrote, "it slipped through, in the shadows, what with them being so busy." The story, rather critical of the authorities, resonated in high places and was read, reportedly, at the Court.

Inspired by his 1872 journey to Lake Ladoga, The Enchanted Wanderer (1873) was an amorphous, loosely structured piece of work, with several plotlines intertwined – the form Leskov thought the traditional novel was destined to be superseded by. Decades later scholars praised the story, comparing the character of Ivan Flyagin to that of Ilya Muromets, as symbolizing "the physical and moral duress of the Russian man in times of trouble," but the response of contemporary critics was lukewarm, Nikolay Mikhaylovsky complaining of its general formlessness: "details stringed together like beads, totally interchangeable." While all of Leskov's previous works were severely cut, this was the first one to be rejected outright; it had to be published in the odd October and November issues of the Russky mir newspaper . In December 1873 Leskov took part in Skladchina, the charity anthology aimed at helping victims of famine in Russia.

Having severed ties with The Russian Messenger, Leskov found himself in serious financial trouble. This was relieved to an extent by his invitation in January 1874 to join the Scholarly Committee of the Ministry of Education (for this he owed much to the Empress consort Maria Alexandrovna who was known to have read The Cathedral Folk and spoke warmly to it), where his duty was to choose literature for Russian libraries and atheneums for a meager wage of one thousand rubles per year. In 1874 Leskov began writing Wandering Lights: A Biography of Praotsev which was soon halted and later printed as Early Years: From Merkula Praotsev’s Memoirs. It was during the publication of this work that the author made a comment which was later seen as his artistic manifesto: "Things pass by us and I'm not going to diminish or boost their respective significance; I won't be forced into doing so by the unnatural, man-made format of the novel which demands the rounding up of fabulas and the drawing together of plotlines to one central course. That's not how life is. Human life runs on in its own way and that's how I'm going to treat the roll of events in my works."

In the spring of 1875 Leskov went abroad, first to Paris, then to Prague and Dresden in August. In December his novella "At the Edge of the World" was published in Grazhdanin (1875, No. 52). All the while he continued to work on a set of stories which would later form his cycle Virtuous Ones. Some critics found Leskov's heroes virtuous beyond belief, but he insisted they were not fantasies, but more like reminiscences of his earlier encounters. "I credit myself with having some ability for analyzing characters and their motives, but I'm hopless at fantasizing. Making up things is hard labour for me, so I've always felt the need for having before me real faces which could intrigue me with their spirituality; then they get hold of me and I infuse them with new life, using some real-life stories as a basis," he wrote later in the Varshavsky Dnevnik newspaper. Years of confrontation with critics and many of his colleagues have taken their toll. "Men of letters seem to recognize my writing as a force, but find great pleasure in killing it; in fact they have all but succeeded in killing it off altogether. I write nothing – I just can't!", he wrote to Pyotr Schebalsky in January 1876.

In October 1881 Rus magazine started publishing "The Tale of Cross-eyed Lefty from Tula and the Steel Flea", which is seen in retrospect as Leskov's finest piece of work, bringing out the best in him as an ingenious storyteller and stylistic virtuoso whose skaz style is rich in word play and full of original neologisms, each carrying not only humorous but satirical messages. In Lefty the author's point of view is engaged in lively interplay with that of the main (grotesquely naive, simple-minded) character. "Some people argued that I had done little to distinguish between the good and the bad, and that it was difficult to make out who was a helper and who put wrenches in the works. This can be explained by the intrinsic deceitfulness of my own character," Leskov later wrote. Most deceitful (according to critic B. Bukhstab) was the author's treatment of the character ataman Platov, whose actions, even as they are described in a grotesquely heroic manner by the simple-minded protagonist, are openly ridiculed by the author. What would later come to be seen as one of the gems of Russian literature was fiercely attacked both from the left (who accused Leskov of propagating jingoistic ideas) and the right, who found the general picture of the common people's existence as depicted in the story a bit too gloomy for their taste.

"Leftie" premiered publicly in March 1882 at the literary and musical evening of The Pushkin Circle; on 16 April it came out in book form. The collection of sketches called Pechersky Antics was written in December, and published by Kievskaya Starina, in its February and April issues. By this time a large Russian Antics cycle began to take shape, in which Leskov implemented, as he saw it, Nikolai Gogol's idea (formulated in the Selected Passages from Correspondence with Friends) of "extoling modest working men." "It is wrong and unworthy to pick out the worst in the soul of the Russian man, so I embarked on my own journey looking for virtuous ones. Whoever I asked would reply to the effect that they knew no such saints, and that all of us were sinful, but they had met some decent men... and I just started writing about them," he wrote in the preface to one such story ("Singlethought", Odnodum, 1879). A similar cycle of short stories involved legends of early Christianity, with plot lines taken from the "prologues" and Byzantine stories of the 10th and 11th centuries. The fact that some of these pieces ("Pamphalone", "Beautiful Azu") were translated into German and praised by publishers, made Leskov immensely proud. What was new to the Russian reader in them was, as Mirsky noted, "a boldly outspoken treatment of sensual episodes"; some critics accused the author of "treating his moral subjects as nothing but pretexts for the display of voluptuous and sensual scenes."

=== Later years ===
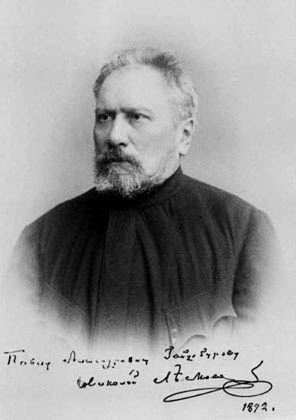
Inscribed portrait of Leskov c1892

In February 1883 the essay "Leap-frog in Church and Local Parish Whimsies" (based on an officially documented episode concerning the outrageous behaviour of a drunken pastor and deacon at a church in a provincial town) was published by Istorichesky vestnik. It caused a scandal and cost its author his job at the Ministry of Education. Minister Delyanov suggested that Leskov should sign a retirement paper, but the latter refused. "What do you need such a firing for?" the Minister reportedly asked. "For a decent obituary," Leskov retorted. In April he informed the director of the Oryol lyceum that he was sending him a gold medal he had received from the Ministry "to be given to the poorest of that year's graduates."

By this time the Russian Orthodox Church had become the major target of Leskov's satire. In an 1883 letter, remembering The Cathedral Folk, he

confessed: "These days I wouldn't do them, I'd rather have written Notes of a Defrocked Priest... to show how all of the Crucified One's commandments are being corrupted and falsified... [My position] would be defined as Tolstoyan these days, while things that have nothing to do with Christ's teaching would be termed Orthodoxy. I wouldn't oppose the term, I'd just say, Christianity this is not." Leskov's religious essays of the early 1880s continued the same line of sympathetically supporting poor clergymen and ridiculing the hypocrisy of the Russian Orthodoxy's higher ranks. In "Count Tolstoy and F. M. Dostoyevsky as Heresiarchs" and "The Golden Age", both 1883) he defended both from the criticism of Konstantin Leontiev. Leskov never became a Tolstoyan, but his later works were impregnated with the idea of "new Christianity" which he himself identified with Leo Tolstoy, whom he became close with in the mid-1880s and was inevitably influenced by. On 18 April 1887, Leskov wrote a letter to Tolstoy asking for permission to visit him in Moscow so as to fulfill a "long-standing desire." On 25 April the two authors met. "What a bright and original man," Tolstoy later wrote in a letter to Chertkov. Leskov spent January 1890 with Chertkov and Tolstoy at Yasnaya Polyana, where Tolstoy read to them his own play The Fruits of Enlightenment.

In July 1883 the first four chapters of the novel As the Falcon Flies were published by Gazeta Gatsuka, followed by chapters five through eight, then chapters nine and ten; at this point the publication ceased due to interference by the censors. In January 1884 the publication of Notes of a Stranger began in Gazeta Gatsuka (No. 2) to be stopped in April, again by the censors. In the summer of 1884, while Leskov was on a trip through Warsaw, Dresden, Marienbad, Prague and Vienna, a special censorship order came out, demanding withdrawal of 125 books from Russian libraries, Leskov's collection Trifles from the Life of Archbishops (1878–79) included. In November 1884, Nov magazine began publishing the novel The Unseen Trail: it was banned after chapter 26 and has never been completed. In November 1888 the novella Zenon the Goldsmith was written for Russkaya mysl and promptly banned. By this time, according to Bukhstab, Leskov found himself in isolation again. The right treated him as a dangerous radical, while the left, under pressure from the Russian government, were too scared to publish radical prose. Leskov himself referred to the stories of his later years as "cruel". "The public doesn't like them because they're cynical and in your face. But I don't want to please the public, I want to torture it and flog it," he wrote.

In August, November and December 1887 respectively, the first three volumes of the collection Novellas and Short Stories by N. S. Leskov were published. At the 1888 New Year party at Alexei Suvorin's, Leskov met Anton Chekhov for the first time. Soon Ilya Repin became Leskov's friend and illustrator. Several months later in a letter, asking Leskov to sit for him, Repin explained his motives: "Not only me but the whole of enlightened Russia loves you as an outstanding, distinguished writer and as a thinking man." The sittings early the next year were aborted: Leskov was unwilling to have his portrait seen at a forthcoming exhibition of Repin's works.

In September 1888 Pyotr Bykov published a full bibliography of Leskov's works (1860–1887) which intrigued publishers. In 1889 Alexei Suvorin's publishing house began publishing the Complete Leskov in 12 volumes (which contained mostly fiction). By June 1889, the fourth and fifth volumes had been issued, but in August volume six, containing some anti-Eastern Orthodox satires was stopped. On 16 August, Leskov suffered his first major heart attack on the stairs of Suvorin's house, upon learning the news. The publication of his works continued with volume seven, generating considerable royalties and greatly improving the author's financial situation. A different version of volume six came out in 1890.

In January 1890 the publication of the novel The Devil Dolls (with Tsar Nikolai I and Karl Bryullov as the prototypes for the two main characters) started in Russkaya Mysl, but was stopped by censors. In 1891 Polunochniki (Night Owls), a thinly veiled satire on the Orthodox Church in general and Ioann Kronshtadsky in particular, was published in Severny vestnik and caused an uproar. The 1894 novella The Rabbit Warren about a clergyman who'd been honoured for reporting people to the authorities and driving a police official into madness by his zealousness (one of "his most remarkable works and his greatest achievement in concentrated satire," according to Mirsky) was also banned and came out only in 1917 (in Niva magazine). The process of having his works published, which had always been difficult for Leskov, at this late stage became, in his own words, "quite unbearable".

In his last years Leskov suffered from angina pectoris and asthma. There were also rumours, whose accuracy and substantiation have been questioned, that he had been diagnosed with male breast cancer. In early 1894 he caught a severe cold; by the end of the year his general condition had deteriorated. Responding to Pavel Tretyakov's special request, Leskov (still very ill) agreed to pose for Valentin Serov, but in February 1895, when the portrait was exhibited in the Tretyakov Gallery, he felt utterly upset both by the portrait and the black frame.

On 5 March 1895, Leskov died, aged 64. The funeral service was held in silence, in accordance with the writer's December 1892 will, forbidding any speeches to be held over his dead body. "I know I have many bad things in me and do not deserve to be praised or pitied," he explained. Leskov was interred in the Literatorskiye Mostki necropolis at the Volkovo Cemetery in Saint Petersburg (the section reserved for literary figures). Due to Leskov's purportedly difficult nature (he has been described as despotic, vindictive, quick-tempered and prone to didacticism), he spent the last years of his life alone, his biological daughter Vera (from his first marriage) living far away and never visiting; his son Andrey residing in the capital but avoiding his father.

== Marriages and children ==
On 6 April 1853 Leskov married Olga Vasilyevna Smirnova (1831–1909), the daughter of an affluent Kiev trader. Their son Dmitry was born on 23 December 1854 but died in 1855. On 8 March 1856, their daughter Vera Leskova was born. She married Dmitry Noga in 1879 and died in 1918. Leskov's marriage was an unhappy one; his wife suffered from severe psychological problems and in 1878 had to be taken to the St. Nicholas Mental Hospital in Saint Petersburg. She died in 1909.

In 1865 Ekaterina Bubnova (née Savitskaya), whom he met for the first time in July 1864, became Leskov's common-law wife. Bubnova had four children from her first marriage; one of whom, Vera (coincidentally the same name as Leskov's daughter by his own marriage) Bubnova, was officially adopted by Leskov, who took care that his stepdaughter got a good education; she embarked upon a career in music. In 1866 Bubnova gave birth to their son, Andrey (1866–1953). In August 1878 Leskov and Bubnova parted, and, with Andrey, Nikolai moved into the Semyonov house at the corner of Kolomenskaya St. and Kuznechny Lane, in Saint Petersburg. Bubnova suffered greatly at having her son taken away from her, as her letters, published many years later, attested.

In November 1883 Varya Dolina (daughter of E.A. Cook, Leskov's maidservant and ethnic Finn) joined Leskov and his son, first as a pupil and protege, soon becoming another of Leskov's adopted daughters.

Andrey Leskov made a career in the military. From 1919 to 1931 he served as a staff officer on the Soviet Army's North-Western frontier and retired with the rank of Lieutenant-General. By this time he had become an authority on his father's legacy, praised by Maxim Gorky among many others and regularly consulted by specialists. Andrey Leskov's The Life of Nikolai Leskov, a comprehensive book of memoirs (which had its own dramatic story: destroyed in the 1942 Siege of Leningrad by a bomb, it was reconstructed from scratch by the 80-plus year old author after the War, and finished in 1948). It was first published by Goslitizdat in Moscow (1954); in 1981 it was re-issued in two volumes by Prioksky publishers in Tula.

== Legacy ==
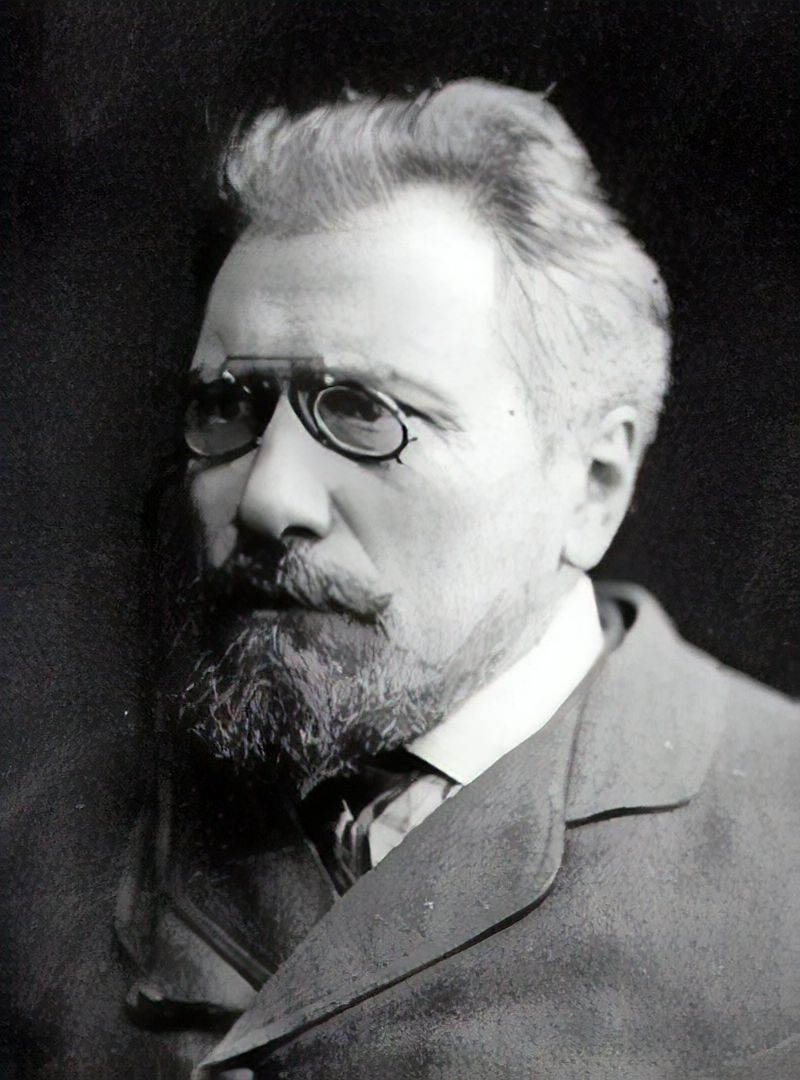

Nikolai Leskov, now widely regarded as a classic of Russian literature, had an extremely difficult literary career, marred by scandals which resulted in boycotts and ostracism. Describing the Russian literary scene at the time Leskov entered it, D. S. Mirsky wrote:

It was a time of intense party strife, when no writer could hope to be well received by all critics and only those who identified themselves with a definite party could hope for even partial recognition. Leskov had never identified himself with any party and had to take the consequences. His success with the reading public was considerable but the critics continued to neglect him. Leskov's case is a striking instance of the failure of Russian criticism to do its duty.

After his 1862 article on the "great fires" and the 1864 novel No Way Out, Leskov found himself in total isolation which in the 1870s and 1880s was only partially relieved. Apollon Grigoriev, the only critic who valued him and approved of his work, died in 1864 and, according to Mirsky, "Leskov owed his latter popularity to the good taste of that segment of the reading public who were beyond the scope of the 'directing' influences". In the 1870s things improved but, according to Brockhaus and Efron Encyclopedic Dictionary, "Leskov's position in his last 12 to 15 years was ambivalent, old friends distrusting him, new ones being still wary. For all his big name, he wasn't a centerpiece literary figure and critics all but ignored him. This didn't prevent the huge success of the Complete Leskov." After the 10th volume of this collection was published, critic Mikhail Protopopov authored an essay called "The Sick Talent". Crediting Leskov as a superb psychologist and a master of "reproducing domestic scenes," he rated him equal to Melnikov-Pechersky and Mikhail Avdeev. What prevented Leskov from getting any higher, the critic argued, were "his love of hyperbole" and what he termed "an overload of spices." At the time of his death in 1895 Leskov "had few friends in literary circles but a great many readers all over Russia," according to Mirsky.

In 1897 The Adolf Marks publishing house re-issued the 1889–1893 12-volume series and in 1902–1903 released the 36-volume version of it, expanded with essays, articles and letters. This, along with Anatoly Faresov's memoirs, Against the Grain (1904), caused a new wave of interest in Leskov's legacy. In 1923 three volumes of Nikolai Leskov's selected works came out in Berlin, featuring an often-quoted rapturous preface by Maxim Gorky (who called Leskov "the wizard of wording"), and was re-issued in the USSR in early 1941.

For decades after his death the attitude of critics toward Leskov and his legacy varied. Despite the fact that some of his sharpest satires could be published only after the 1917 Revolution, Soviet literary propaganda found little of use in Leskov's legacy, often labeling the author a "reactionary" who had "denied the possibility of social revolution," placing too much attention on saintly religious types. For highlighting the author's 'progressive' inclinations "Leftie" (a "glorification of Russian inventiveness and talent") and "The Toupee Artist" (a "denunciation of the repressive nature of Tsarist Russia") were invariably chosen. "He is a brilliant author, an insightful scholar of our ways of life, and still he's not being given enough credit", Maxim Gorky wrote in 1928, deploring the fact that after the 1917 Revolution Leskov was still failing to gain ground in his homeland as a major classic.

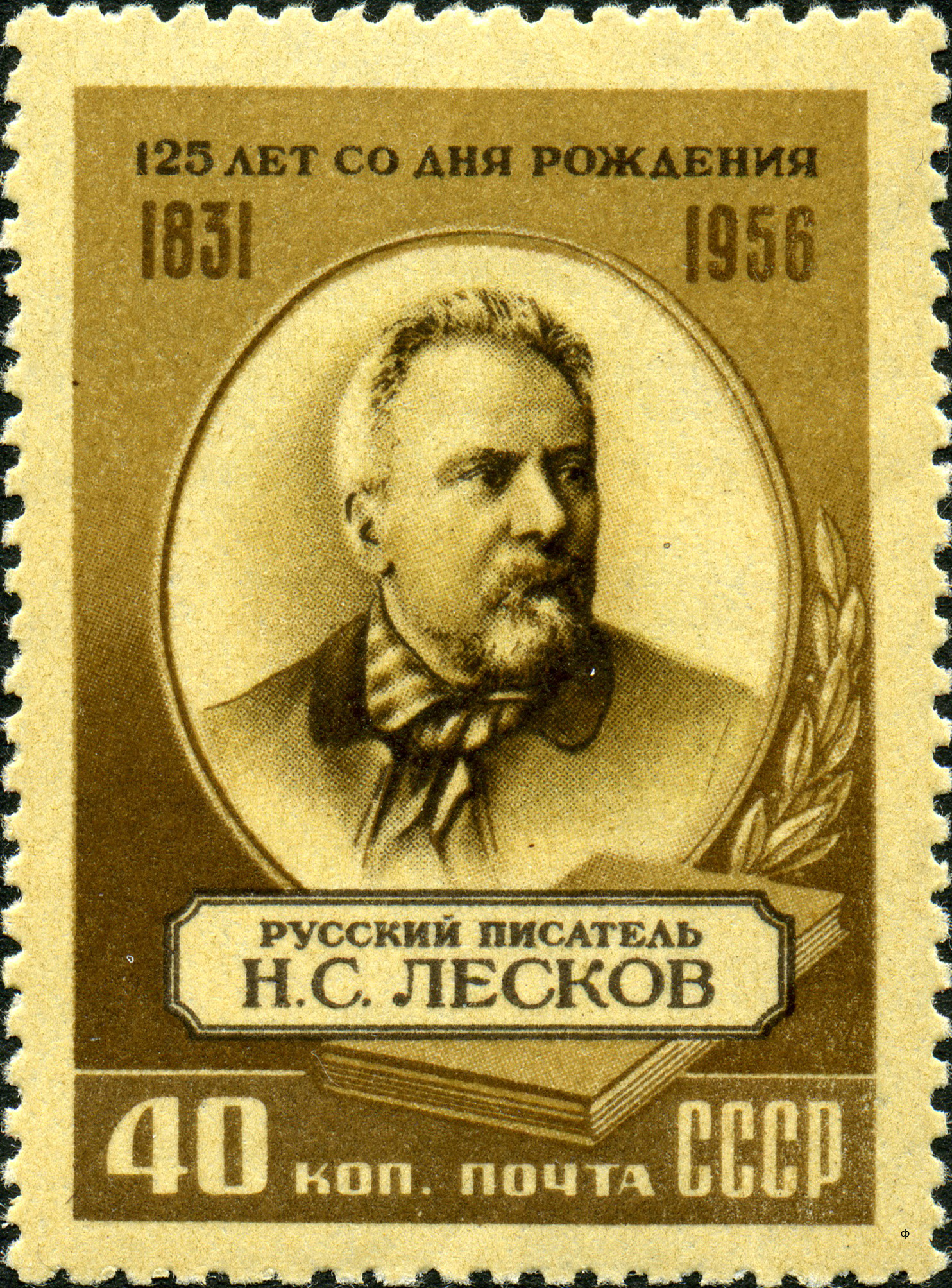
The 125th Leskov Anniversary stamp

The inability of the new literary ideologists to counterbalance demands of propaganda with attempts at objectivity was evidenced in the 1932 Soviet Literary Encyclopedia entry, which said: "In our times when the problem-highlighting type of novel has gained prominence, opening up new horizons for socialism and construction, Leskov's relevancy as a writer, totally foreign to the major tendencies of our Soviet literature, naturally wanes. The author of 'Lefty', though, retains some significance as a chronicler of his social environment and one of the best masters of Russian prose." Nevertheless, by 1934 Dmitry Shostakovich had finished his opera, Lady Macbeth of the Mtsensk District, which caused a furore at home and abroad (to be eventually denounced in 1936 by Pravda). Before that, in 1929, Ivan Shyshov's opera The Toupee Artist (after Leskov's story of the same name) had been published and successfully staged.

In the post-World War II USSR the interest in Leskov's legacy was continually on the rise, never going, though, beyond certain censorship-set limits. Several scholarly essays came out, and then an extensive biography by the writer's son Andrey Leskov was published in 1954. In 1953 the Complete Gorky series featured his 1923 essay on Leskov, which became the object of lively academic discussion. The 11-volume 1956–1958 (and then 6 volume 1973–1974) Complete Leskov editions were obviously incomplete: one of his political "anti-nihilistic" novels At Daggers Drawn, was missing, included essays and letters carefully selected. Yet, in fifty years' time things changed radically. While in 1931, on the 100th anniversary of Leskov's birth, critics wrote of the "scandalous reputation which followed Leskov's literary life from beginning to the end," by 1981 Leskov, according to the critic Lev Anninsky, was regarded as a first rank Russian classic, and academic essays on him had found their place in the Moscow University's new course between those on Dostoevsky and Leo Tolstoy. In 1989 Ogonyok re-issued the 12-volume Leskov collection in which At Daggers Drawn appeared for the first time in the USSR.

In 1996 the Terra publishing house in Russia started a 30-volume Leskov series, declaring the intention to include every single work or letter by the author, but by 2007 only 10 volumes of it had come out. The Literaturnoye nasledstvo publishers started the Unpublished Leskov series: book one (fiction) came out in 1991, book two (letters and articles) – in 2000; both were incomplete, and the volume six material, which had been banned a century ago and proved to be too tough for the Soviet censors, was again neglected. All 36 volumes of the 1902 Marks Complete Leskov were re-issued in 2002 and Moshkov's On-line Library gathered a significant part of Leskov's legacy, including his most controversial novels and essays.

=== Social and religious stance ===
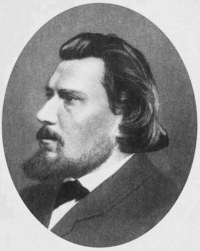
"I could never understand this idea of 'studying' the life of the common people, for I felt it would be more natural for a writer to 'live' this kind of life, rather than 'study' it." Nikolai Leskov in 1860

In retrospect, the majority of Leskov's legacy, documentary in essence, could be seen as part of the 19th century raznochintsy literature which relied upon the 'real life sketch' as a founding genre. But, while Gleb Uspensky, Vasily Sleptsov and Fyodor Reshetnikov were preaching "the urgent need to study the real life of the common people," Leskov was caustic in his scorn: "Never could I understand this popular idea among our publicists of 'studying' the life of the common people, for I felt it would be more natural for a writer to 'live' this kind of life, rather than 'study' it," he remarked. With his thorough knowledge of the Russian provinces, competence in every nuance of the industrial, agricultural and religious spheres, including obscure regional, sectarian or ethnic nuances, Leskov regarded his colleagues on the radical left as cabinet theoreticians, totally rootless in their "studies". Leskov was not indifferent to social injustice, according to Bukhstab. "It was just that he viewed social problems as a strict practitioner for whom only personal experience was worthy of trust while none of the theories based on philosophical doctrines held water. Unlike the Social Democrats, Leskov neither believed in the possibility of an agrarian revolution in Russia, nor wanted it to happen, seeing education and enlightenment, often of religious nature, as the factors for social improvement," wrote the biographer.

On the other hand, he had very little in common with Russian literary aristocrats. According to D. S. Mirsky, Leskov was "one of those Russian writers whose knowledge of life was not founded on the possession of serfs, to be later modified by university theories of French or German origin, like Turgenev's and Tolstoy's, but on practical and independent experience. This is why his view of Russian life is so unconventional and so free from that attitude of condescending and sentimental pity for the peasant which is typical of the liberal and educated serf-owner." Mirsky expressed bewilderment at how Leskov, after his first novel No Way Out, could have been seriously regarded as a 'vile and libelous reactionary', when in reality (according to the critic) "the principal socialist characters in the book were represented as little short of saints."

Some modern scholars argue that, contrary to what his contemporary detractors said, Leskov had not held "reactionary" or even "conservative" sensibilities and his outlook was basically that of a democratic enlightener, who placed great hopes upon the 1861 social reform and became deeply disillusioned soon afterwards. The post-serfdom anachronisms that permeated Russian life in every aspect, became one of his basic themes. Unlike Dostoevsky, who saw the greatest danger in the development of capitalism in Russia, Leskov regarded the "immovability of Russia's 'old ways' as its main liability," critic Viduetskaya insisted. Leskov's attitude towards 'revolutionaries' was never entirely negative, this critic argued; it's just that he saw them as totally unprepared for the mission they were trying to take upon themselves, this tragic incongruity being the leitmotif of many of his best known works; (The Musk-Ox, Mystery Man, The Passed By, At Daggers Drawn).

In 1891, after Mikhail Protopopov's article "The Sick Talent" was published, Leskov responded with a letter of gratitude, pointing out: "You've judged me better than those who wrote of me in the past. Yet historical context should be taken into account too. Class prejudices and false piety, religious stereotypes, nationalistic narrow-mindedness, what with having to defend the state with its glory... I grew up amidst all of this, and I was sometimes abhorred by it all... still I couldn't see the [true Christianity's guiding] light."

Like Tolstoy and Dostoevsky, Leskov saw the Gospel as the moral codex for humanity, the guiding light of its development and an ideological basis for any progress. His "saintly" gallery of characters propagated the same idea of "multiplying what was good all over the land." On the other hand, the author often used religious plots to highlight contemporary problems, often in the most frivolous manner. Some of his stories, Christian on the face of it, were, according to Viduetskaya, "pagan in spirit, especially next to the ascetic Tolstoy's prose of the similar kind." Intrigued by the Raskol movement with its history and current trends, Leskov never agreed with those of his collaugues (Afanasy Shchapov among them) who saw Raskol communities as a potentially revolutionary force and shared the views of Melnikov-Pechersky concerning Old Believers.

In his latter years Leskov came under the influence of Leo Tolstoy, developing the concept of "new Christianity" he himself identified with the latter. "I am in total harmony with him, and there's not a single person in the whole world who's more dear to me. Things I don't share with him never bother me; what I cherish is the general state of his soul, as it were, and his mind's frightful insightfulness," Leskov wrote in another letter, to Vladimir Chertkov.

As D.S. Mirsky pointed out, Leskov's Christianity, like that of Tolstoy, was "anti-clerical, undenominational and purely ethical." But there, the critic argued, the similarities ended. "The dominant ethical note is different. It is the cult not of moral purity and of reason, but of humility and charity. "Spiritual pride", self-conscious righteousness is for Leskov the greatest of crimes. Active charity is for him the principal virtue, and he attaches very little value to moral purity, still less to physical purity... [The] feeling of sin as the necessary soil for sanctity and the condemnation of self-righteous pride as a sin against the Holy Ghost is intimately akin to the moral sense of the Russian people and of the Eastern church, and very different from Tolstoy's proud Protestant and Luciferian ideas of perfection", Mirsky wrote.

=== Style and form ===
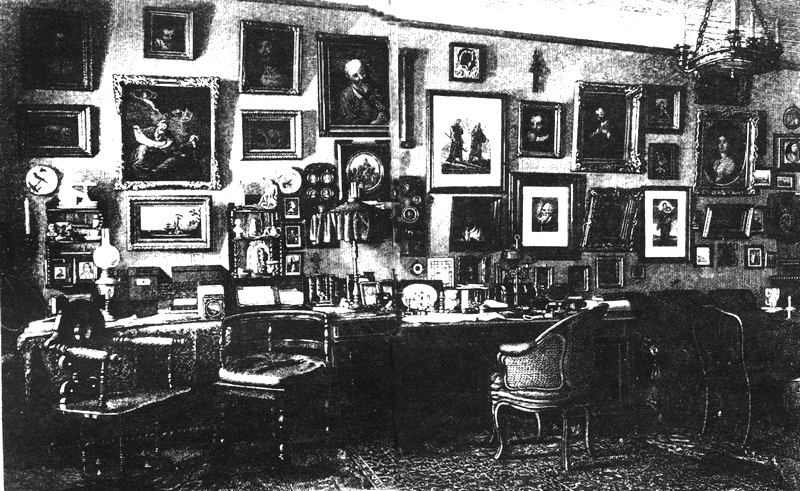
Leskov's study in Saint Petersburg

Not long before his death, Leskov reportedly said: "Now they read me just for the intricacies of my stories, but in fifty years' time the beauty of it all will fade and only the ideas my books contain will retain value." That, according to Mirsky, was an exceptionally ill-judged forecast. "Now more than ever Leskov is being read and praised for his inimitable form, style and manner of speech," the critic wrote in 1926. Many critics and colleagues of Leskov wrote about his innovative style and experiments in form. Anton Chekhov called him and Turgenev his two "tutors in literature."

According to Bukhstab, it was Leskov whose works Chekhov used as a template for mastering his technique of constructing short stories, marveling at their density and concentration, but also at their author's ability to make a reader share his views without imposing them, using subtle irony as an instrument. Tellingly, Leskov was the first of the major Russian authors to notice Chekhov's debut and predict his future rise. Leo Tolstoy (while still expressing reservations as to the "overabundance of colours") called Leskov "a writer for the future."

Maxim Gorky was another great admirer of Leskov's prose, seeing him as one of the few figures in 19th century Russian literature who had both ideas of their own and the courage to speak them out loud. Gorky linked Leskov to the elite of Russian literary thinkers (Dostoyevsky, Pisemsky, Goncharov and Turgenev) who "formed more or less firm and distinct views on the history of Russia and developed their own way of working within its culture." 20th century critics credited Leskov with being an innovator who used the art of wording in a totally new and different manner, increasing the functional scope of phrasing, making it a precision instrument for drawing the nuances of human character. According to Gorky, unlike Tolstoy, Gogol, Turgenev or Goncharov who created "portraits set in landscapes," Leskov painted his backgrounds unobtrusively by "simply telling his stories," being a true master of "weaving a nervous fabric of lively Russian common talk," and "in this art had no equals."

Gorky saw Leskov as a true artist whose place "beside masters like L. Tolstoy, Gogol, Turgenev and Goncharov is well-deserved". He was greatly intrigued by the way Leskov managed to secure himself total independence in the community where no such thing seemed possible ("he was neither Narodnik nor Slavophile, neither Westernizer, nor liberal or conservative") and, at the same time, developed "deep insight into the life of the existing classes and social groups of Russia... something none of his greater contemporaries like Tolstoy or Turgenev, could ever do". "... It was Leskov who dissected Rus thoroughly," Gorky said (through his character Klim Samgin), later explaining: "Leskov was... the only Russian author to have succeeded in separating the whole generation of his countrymen into a new set of sub-classes, each belonging to a different epoch." Gorky mentioned Leskov among authors that had helped him form his own style and outlook. "It was partly under Leskov's influence that I decided to go out and see how real people lived," he wrote. "Leskov influenced me enormously, with his knowledge of the Russian language and its richness," Gorky remarked in another letter.

Leskov was continuously experimenting with forms, his most favourable being "the chronicle" which he saw as a healthy alternative to orthodox novel. "Things pass by us and I'm not going to diminish or boost their respective significance; I won't be forced into doing so by the unnatural, man-made format of the novel which demands the rounding up of fabulas and the drawing together of plotlines to one central course. That's not how life is. Human life runs on in its own way and that's how I'm going to treat the roll of events in my works," he once wrote. Brockhaus and Efron Encyclopedic Dictionary's biographer Semyon Vengerov found in Leskov traits common to Alexander Ostrovsky, Aleksey Pisemsky and Fyodor Dostoevsky. "But the most astounding feature in him is what Turgenev called his 'inventiveness'. Some of Leskov's 5–6 page stories are packed with plotlines that could have filled volumes. This is especially true for The Enchanted Wanderer where each new turn brings out another fascinating scene, with its own new set of colours. Apart from his large anti-nihilistic novels (No Way Out, At Daggers Drawn), less successful artistically, Leskov's prose is remarkably concise and totally devoid of filler and ballast," Vengerov added.

The major issue contemporary critics had with Leskov's prose was what they perceived to be an "overabundance of colours"; the grotesque expressiveness of the language he used. This view was shared by some of his colleagues. Leo Tolstoy who rated Leskov very high still thought he was "too over the top" in his linguistic experiments. In a December 3, 1890, letter, writing of the short story "The Hour of God's Will", he remarked: "This fairytale is excellent, but it would have been much better if not for this overabundance of talent." Leskov was unrepentant. "To write in a simple manner as Lev Nikolayevich does, is beyond me. Such a gift is not mine... take me as I am, for I've gotten used to polishing my stuff and simply cannot work in any other way," he wrote to Chertkov in one of his 1888 letters. "My clergymen talk like clergymen do, and my muzhiks talk like muzhiks talk in real life... this folkish, vulgar and intricate language is not of my invention, I've listened for years to Russian people talking... and I can say that in my books they talk like they do in real life, not in literary fashion," he insisted later, speaking to biographer Anatoly Faresov.

Contemporary critics often dismissed Leskov as a mere "anecdote collector". Years later scholars found a uniqueness in Leskov's prose mostly in that it was almost entirely based on anecdotes; bizarre or absurd real life events. Some of his collections, like Notes of a Stranger (1884) and Trifles from the Life of Archbishops (1878–79) "were nothing but collections of anecdotes, a fact which made them no less powerful, expressive pieces of prose," critic E. Viduetskaya argued. Leskov, who liked to unite his stories and sketches into cycles (The Voice of Nature (1883), The Uniters (1884), Aleksandrit (1885), a series of Christmas stories (1881–1885), etc.) has been credited with creating a comprehensive picture of contemporary Russian society using mostly short literary forms.

Enchanted by the ways of life, customs and habits of different, often obscure, ethnic and social groups in Russia, but (unlike Chekhov and Pisemsky who were interested in tendencies) focusing on the bizarre and strange elements of it, Leskov was helped by the unique linguistic memory he'd been endowed with. A profound analysis of Russia through its language was for him a major aim. "The author develops his own voice by learning how to make the voices of his characters his own", he remarked, adding: "A man shows his character best in the smallest things."

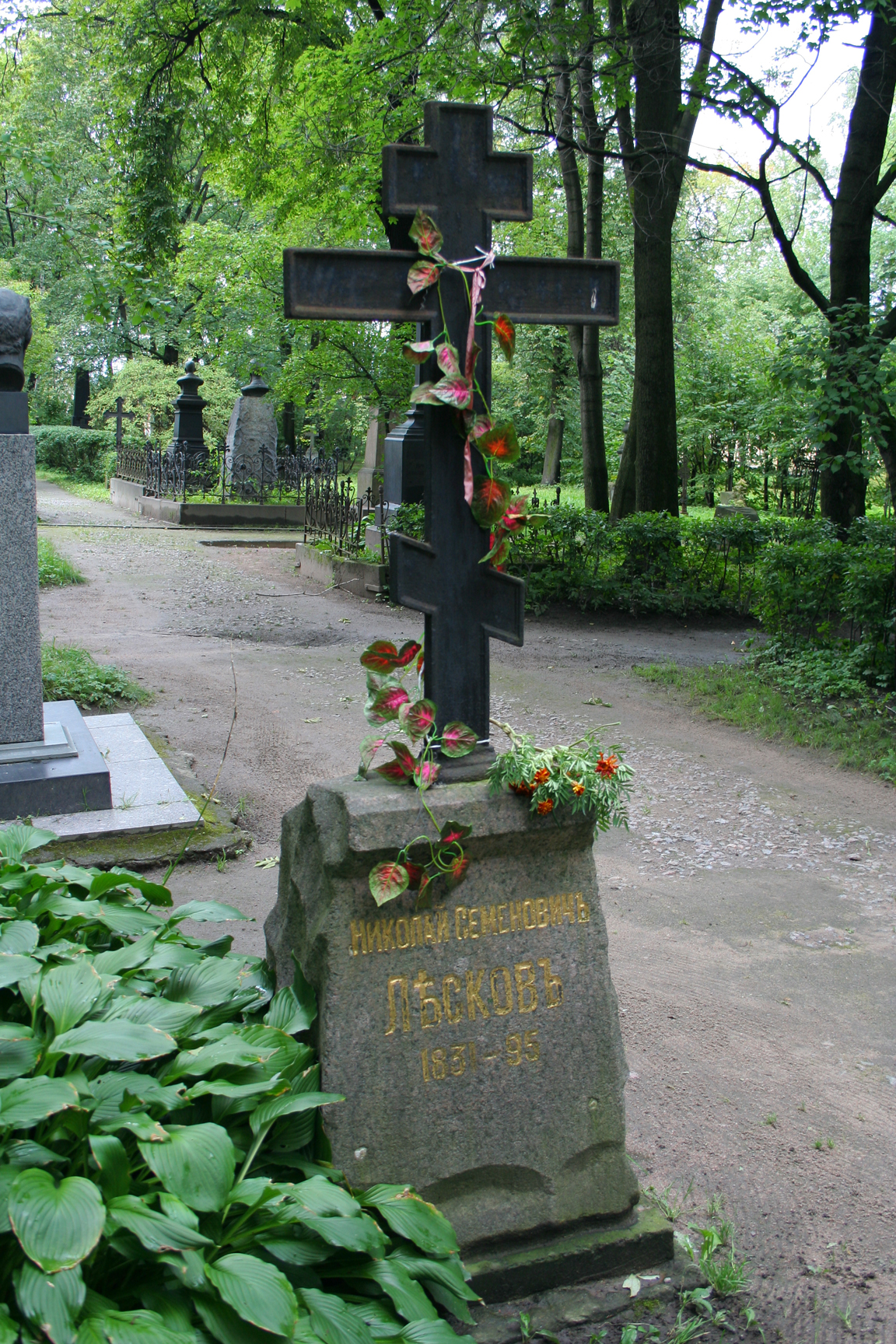
Volkov Cemetery. Nikolai Leskov's grave

"I prefer to build a story upon a real fact, not fiction," he once remarked. This had to do more with his own concept of literature as a branch of history, in other words, being an intrinsically documentary art form. He attributed great social importance to history, seeing it as a major factor in healthy social development. Most of Leskov's characters had real life prototypes, while some of them bore the names of real persons ("Cadet Monastery", "A Man at the Guard", "Vladyka's Judgment", "Penniless Engineers", etc.) "Truth can indeed be made to be more thrilling than fiction, and you surely are the master of this art," Leo Tolstoy wrote Leskov in a letter. "The Russian people acknowledge Leskov as the Most Russian of all Russian writers; a man who knew the Russian people better and more deeply than anybody else," Mirsky maintained.

Explaining why Leskov had not yet come into his own with English-speaking readers, in spite of the admiration for him of some English critics, like Maurice Baring, Mirsky wrote in 1926: "The Anglo-Saxon public have made up their minds as to what they want from a Russian writer, and Leskov does not fit into that idea. But those who really want to know more about Russians sooner or later recognize that Russia is not all contained in Dostoyevsky and Chekhov, and that if you want to know anything, you must first be free of prejudice and on your guard against hasty generalizations."

== Selected bibliography ==
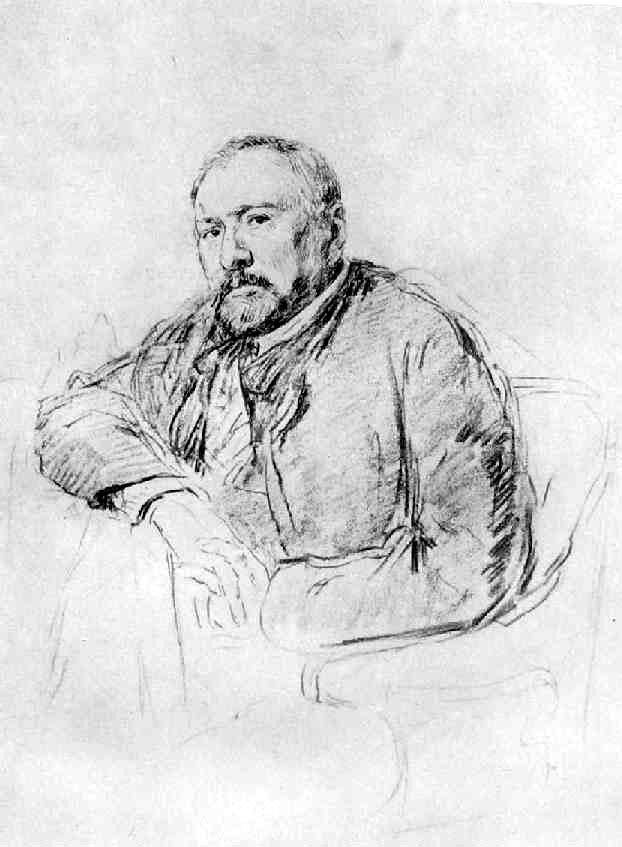
Nikolai Semyonovich Leskov by Ilya Repin, 1888–89

=== Novels ===
- Nekuda (1864, No Way Out, not translated)
- Oboydyonnye (1865, Neglected People, not translated)
- Ostrovityane (1866, The Islanders, not translated)
- Na Nozhakh (1870, At Daggers Drawn, not translated)
- The Cathedral Folk (1872, tr. 1924)
- Zakhudalyy Rod (1873, A Decayed Family, not translated)
- Chyortovy Kukly (1890, The Devil Dolls, full text published in 2015, not translated)

=== Novellas ===
- Musk-Ox (1862)
- Lady Macbeth of the Mtsensk District (1865)
- The Amazon (1866)
- The Sealed Angel (1872)
- The Enchanted Wanderer (1873)
- ”On the Edge of the World” (1876)

=== Short stories ===
- The Tale of Cross-eyed Lefty from Tula and the Steel Flea (1881)
- Pamphalon the Mountebank (1887)
- Gora (The Mountain) (1890)
- Judol (Vale of Tears) (1892)
- Zayachii remiz (The Rabbit Warren) (1895)

=== English translations ===
- 'The Sealed Angel,' in Russian Sketches, Chiefly of Peasant Life, translated by Beatrix L. Tollemache, Smith, Elder, 1913.
- The Steel Flea, translated by Isabel F. Hapgood, privately printed for the Company of Gentlemen Adventurers at the Merrymount Press, 1916.
- The Sentry and Other Stories, translated by A. E. Chamot (John Lane, 1922; Hyperion Press, 1977. ISBN 0-88355-501-8)
- The Enchanted Wanderer, translated by A. G. Paschkoff, Robert M. McBride & Company, 1924.
- The Cathedral Folk, translated by Isabel F. Hapgood (John Lane, 1924; Hyperion Press, 1977. ISBN 0-88355-488-7)
- The Steel Flea, translated by Babette Deutsch and Avrahm Yarmolinsky, Harper & Row, 1943.
- The Musk-Ox and Other Tales, translated by R. Norman (Routledge, 1944; Hyperion Press, 1977. ISBN 0-88355-499-2)
- The Enchanted Pilgrim and Other Stories, translated by David Magarshack, Hutchinson, 1946.
- The Amazon and Other Stories, translated by David Magarshack (George Allen & Unwin, 1949; Hyperion Press, 1976. ISBN 0-88355-495-X)
- The Enchanted Wanderer and Other Stories, translated by George H. Hanna (Raduga, 1958; University Press of the Pacific, 2001. ISBN 0-89875-195-0)
- Selected Tales, translated by David Magarshack (Noonday Press, 1961. ISBN 0-374-50208-0; Modern Library Classics, 2003. ISBN 0-8129-6696-1)
- The Wild Beast, translated by Guy Daniels, Funk & Wagnalls, 1968.
- Satirical Stories of Nikolai Leskov, translated by William B. Edgerton and Hugh McLean, Pegasus, 1969. ISBN 0-672-63589-5
- The Sealed Angel and Other Stories, translated by K. A. Lantz, University of Tennessee Press, 1984. ISBN 0-87049-411-2
- Lady Macbeth of Mtsensk and Other Stories, translated by David McDuff, Penguin Classics, 1988. ISBN 0-14-044491-2
- On the Edge of the World, translated by Michael Prokurat, St. Vladimir's Seminary Press, 1993. ISBN 0-88141-118-3
- Lady Macbeth of Mtsensk, translated by Robert Chandler, Hesperus Classics, 2003. ISBN 1-84391-068-3
- The Cathedral Clergy: A Chronicle, translated by Margaret Winchell, Slavica Publishers, 2010. ISBN 0-89357-373-6
- The Enchanted Wanderer, translated by Ian Dreiblatt, Melville House Publishers, 2012. ISBN 1-61219-103-7
- The Enchanted Wanderer and Other Stories, translated by Richard Pevear and Larissa Volokhonsky, Alfred A. Knopf, 2013. ISBN 0-30726-882-9
- Lady Macbeth of Mtsensk: Selected Stories of Nikolai Leskov, translated by Donald Rayfield, Robert Chandler and William Edgerton, New York Review Books, 2020.
