= Musk-ox (Nikolai Leskov) =

1863 novella by Nikolai Leskov

Musk-Ox
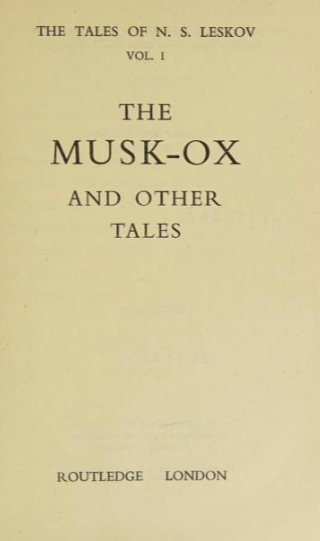
- Title page for Musk-ox (1944 edition, original publication 1863)
- Author: Nikolai Leskov
- Original title: Овцебык
- Language: Russian
- Publisher: Otechestvennye Zapiski
- Publication date: 1863
- Publication place: Russia
- Media type: Print (Paperback & Hardback)
- Followed by: No Way Out

Musk-Ox (Russian: Овцебык, romanized: Ovtsebyk) is a novella by Nikolai Leskov, first published in the April, No. 4 1863 issue of Otechestvennye Zapiski. According to the author, it was written on 28 November 1862 in Paris, France. The text of the novel has been revised twice, first before its inclusion into the Stories and Sketches by M. Stebnitsky (vol. I, 1867), Stebnitsky being Leskov's pseudonym, and later for the first edition of The Works by N.S. Leskov (vol. VI, 1890).

== Plot summary ==
An ex-seminary student, Vasily Bogoslovsky, a.k.a. Ovtsebyk (Musk-Ox, a nickname referring both to peculiarities of his appearance and certain habits), is an eccentric whose every step and phrase baffles and amuses people. He detests what's going on around him, but is incapable of any practical work, spending his time loitering in the woods, reading Latin philosophers and visiting his old friends from time to time, reminding them about his urgent need of finding any kind of employment.

Alexander Sviridov, once a serf peasant and now a successful building engineer, entrepreneur and businessman, is a direct opposite: intelligent and good-natured, he is a practical man, enjoying all-round respect and admiration. It is to him and Nastasya Petrovna, his beautiful wife, that the narrator comes asking to help find for Ovtsebyk just any occupation to keep him from trouble. Alexander and Nastasya try their best but fail. Ovtsebyk shies the caring Nastasya, and ignores whatever work he's presented with, preferring to wander around, "agitating" against the general state of things. Developing an almost irrational hatred towards the only man who's eager to give him work and shelter, he's deeply pained by the way the "common people" he cares for, love the latter and ignore his own anti-social "sermons". Unable to cope with this unfairness, he hangs himself.

== Reception ==
According to Maxim Gorky,

Leskov has succeeded in making everybody dislike him instantly. The young readership, for one, failed to hear from him the urge "to go and join the common people" they've got used to already. Conversely, this sad story of his, The Muck-Ox, carried the warning: do not meddle with things you know nothing of... Those were the times when people were eager to believe into the fictitious freedom-loving muzhik. But Leskov came out with his Musk-Ox featuring a seminary student going out to agitate peasants, trying to convince them that all timber dealers were enemy to them. Muzhiks agree: 'You are right' man, - then go and report him to the trader: 'Keep an eye on this guy, he’s not right in his head'. And the poor agitator hangs himself, seeing that there's no way for him to overcome the trader.

"This was the prelude to this 'avengeful' novel, No Way Out," the author's son Andrey Leskov wrote in his biography. The Great Soviet Encyclopedia (1979) also mentions Musk-ox alongside No Way Out and Neglected People as being were "directed against the 'new men'."
