= The Garin Death Ray =

1926–1927 novel by Aleksey Nikolayevich Tolstoy

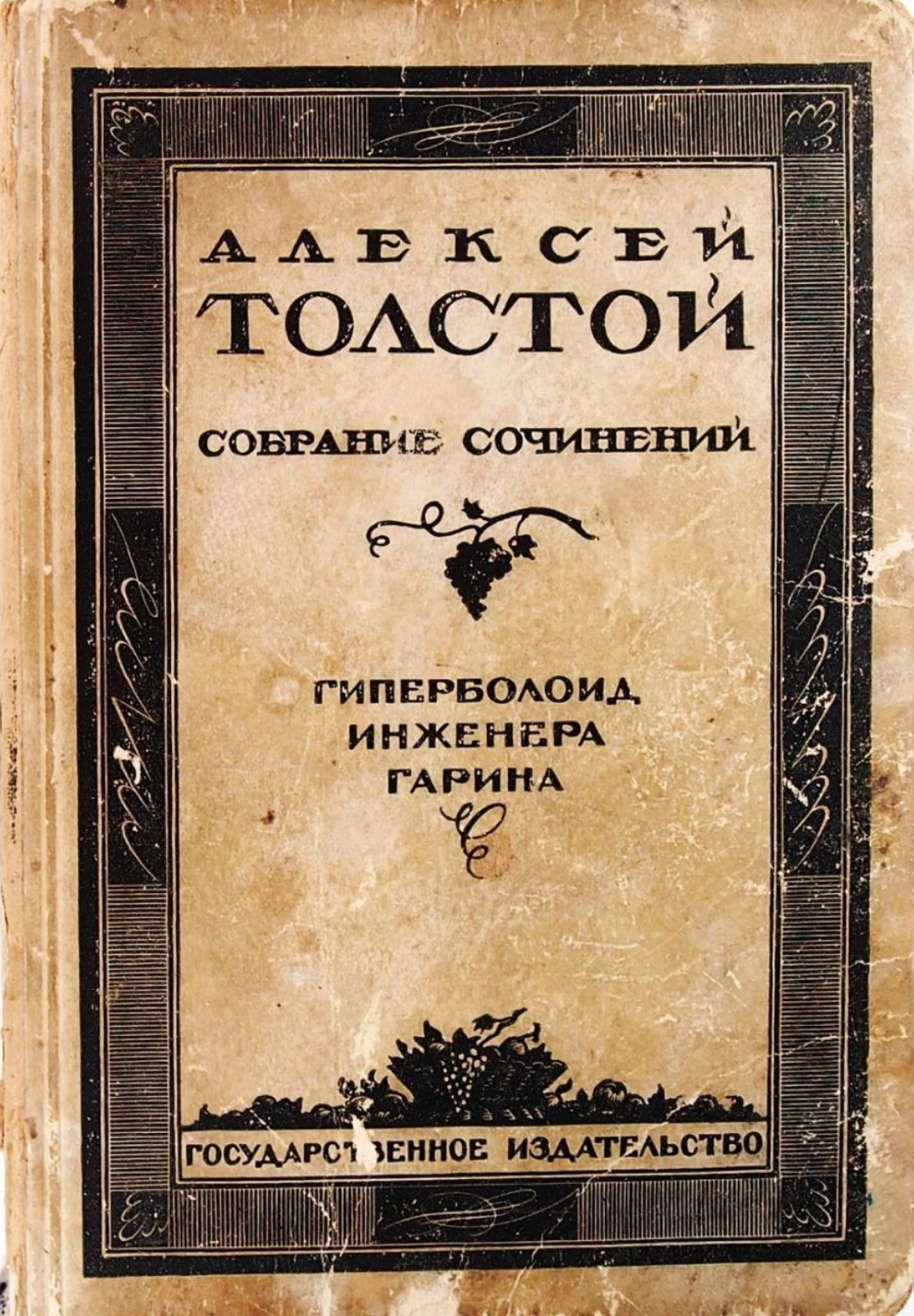
- Book cover of the first Russian edition, 1927
- Author: Aleksey Tolstoy
- Original title: Гиперболоид инженера Гарина
- Translator: Bernard Guilbert Guerney (1st edition); George Hanna (revised ed.)
- Language: Russian
- Genre: Science-fiction novel
- Publisher: Methuen (1st edition); Foreign Language (revised edition)
- Publication date: 1927
- Publication place: Soviet Union
- English publication date: 1936 (1st edition) and 1955 (revised edition)

The Garin Death Ray, also known as The Death Box and The Hyperboloid of Engineer Garin (Russian: Гиперболоид инженера Гарина), is a science-fiction novel written in 1926–1927 by the Russian author Aleksey Nikolayevich Tolstoy (1882–1945).

The "hyperboloid" of the title is not a geometrical surface (though that is utilized in the device design) but a "death ray"-laser-like device (thought up by the author many decades before lasers were invented) that the protagonist, engineer Garin, uses to fight his enemies while trying to become the dictator of the world. The idea of a "death ray" (popularized in The War of the Worlds by H. G. Wells, among others) was commonplace in science fiction of the time, but Aleksey Tolstoy's version is unique for its level of technical details. "Hyperboloids" of different power-capability differ in their effect. The device uses two hyperbolic mirrors (in contrast to Wells's Heat-Ray, which uses a parabolic mirror) to concentrate light rays in a parallel beam. Larger "hyperboloids" can destroy military ships on the horizon, while those of less power can only injure people and cut electric cables on walls of rooms.

Professor Georgy Slyusarev, an expert in optics, in his 1944 book "О возможном и невозможном в оптике" ("About Possible and Impossible in Optics") presented arguments about the infeasibility of Garin's fictional device.

== Adaptations ==
Two film adaptations of the novel were released in the Soviet Union in 1965 (The Hyperboloid of Engineer Garin) and 1973 (Failure of Engineer Garin).

Aleksandr Abdulov started shooting his own version of Hyperboloid, but it was unfinished due to Abdulov's illness and death.

== Influence ==
- Charles H. Townes, the inventor of laser, said that his invention had been inspired by this novel.
- Vladimir Nabokov included parodic elements in his tragicomedy The Waltz Invention (1938).
- The Soviet rock band Kino was originally known as Garin i giperboloidy (Russian: Гарин и Гиперболоиды, Garin and the hyperboloids).
- The Estonian punk band Vennaskond has an album and a song "Insener Garini hüperboloid" (The Hyperboloid of Engineer Garin in Estonian).
