= The Life of a Peasant Woman =

1863 novel by Nikolai Leskov

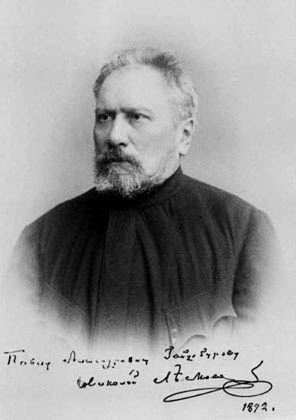
- Author Nikolay Leskov in 1872
- Author: Nikolai Leskov
- Original title: Житие одной бабы
- Language: Russian
- Publisher: Biblioteka dlya tchtenya
- Publication date: 1863
- Publication place: Russia
- Media type: Print (Paperback & Hardback)

The Life of a Peasant Woman (Житие одной бабы, Zhitiye odnoi baby) is a short novel by Nikolai Leskov, first published in 1863's 7th and 8th issues of Biblioteka dlya chteniya magazine, under the moniker of M. Stebnitsky. It has never been re-issued in its author's lifetime. In 1924 the novel was published in Leningrad by an editor and literary historian Pyotr Bykov in a different version and under the new title, Amour in Lapotochki subtitled: "An attempt at a peasant novel. The new, unpublished version." This publication caused controversy and later its authenticity has been called into question. In the latter Soviet collections the original 1863 Leskov text was used, all the editorial cuts and additions being mentioned in commentaries.

== Synopsis ==
Nastya, a quiet, shy and nice-looking peasant servant, strikes a friendship with Masha, the landlord's six-year-old daughter. Then disaster strikes: Nastya is to marry Grigory, an ugly half-wit with a reputation of a village idiot, the outrageous scheme being arranged between her own evil brother Kostik and his business partner Isay Prokudin, Grigory's father, desperately looking for an 'heir'. The marriage proves to be a tragic farce. For Nastya a long period of fierce mental and physical suffering follows. She tries to escape, gets retrieved, suffers from a mysterious mental condition people around her see as "possession" which promptly disappears as she finds herself in the home of Sila Ivanovich Krylushkin, an old man and a local herb-healer. Meanwhile, Grigory ventures for Ukraine to make money as a labourer, Nastya returns to Prokudin's house and slowly gets back to life, still feeling apathetic and unhappy.

She meets Stepan, a good-looking peasant man, equally unhappy in his family life, who falls in love with her. She reciprocates. The two decide to run away, obtain false documents and head for the South aiming at Nikolayev, but get caught in Nezhin, a provincial Oryol Governorate town, and find themselves jailed. Nastya gives birth to a boy, who soon dies. As the pair is being transported back home, Stepan falls ill and lags behind, later to die of typhoid. Now raving mad, Nastya arrives back to the Prokudin house. Again Sila Krylushkin comes to help, giving the woman safe haven in his home where some of his patients are being kept. The house is raided by the police to investigate its owner's illegal healing practice. Nastya is sent to an asylum, escapes, lives in the local woods for some time, then, as the winter comes, is found frozen to death.

=== The epilogue ===
The novel ends with a lengthy epilogue where the narrator (judging by some personal details, none other than Leskov himself) returns to the village of Gostomlh after five years' absence. He finds things changed here, some of them for the better, even if there's another melancholy note being struck by the news that lovely Masha, Nastya's little loyal friend, has died in the boarding house at the age of 12, of scarlet fever.

Serfdom abolished, the atmosphere has changed ("People there became - not exactly happier, but showing more care, the former apathy's gone; they are busy talking about things among themselves"). Men's treatment of their women, though, remains the same. The author becomes a witness of an ugly scene: a woman gets flogged by a group of men just for "not showing enough respect" to her husband. Horrified, she pleads only to be punished by women, but the male community responds with good-natured laughter and, as afterwards she pronounces the humiliating "thank you for the lesson," sincerely believe they've done a good job, only one of them mourning the fact that the team of punishers was not big enough. Another incident of the same kind takes place at the market square where a woman gets force-fed with a piece of soap she was trying to steal ("just to wash my baby's cloth," she sobs). The author runs to a local policeman asking to stop the outrage, but the latter, treating the guest to his wine, remarks: "Come on, they sure know better. And what could I possibly do? They are self-governed nowadays." "Self-government (samoupravle′nye) equals to self-handedness (samoupra′vstvo) in their minds," the author bitterly comments.

There's one thing that fills Leskov with unqualified delight, and that's the conversation with Misha, a 14-year-old brother to the late Masha. The teenager tells him about how different were now things in the gymnasium the author feared and hated. "Take our teacher of the Russian language, what a good soul he is, and how does he love common people," Misha marvels. It turns out he, along with his classmates, volunteered to give lessons to peasant boys (who were "so respoding and so quick in learning!") In the end he recites to the elder guest the poem by Apollon Maykov, beginning with words: "Oh God! You give my motherland your warmth and bread, those sacred gifts of Heaven/ Please, dear God, impart to it some of your spiritual feeding, too..." "We firmly shook hands and kissed and parted as very good friends," thus Leskov concludes the epilogue.

== The second version controversy ==
In the epilogue to his 1924 publication Pyotr Bykov wrote:

Leskov has attached much importance to this first attempt at a peasant novel. While revisiting his work and making editorial changes he more and more highlighted certain aspects of it which made him more and more intrigued. Once, having gathered around him a tight circle of literary friends, Nikolai Semyonovich read the novel and, having finished, announced his intention to radically re-work it. He fulfilled his promise. Having made drastic changes, he wanted to publish it as a separate edition but failed to do this due to heavy censorship that was there [in the late 1880s].

According to Bykov, Leskov has presented him the manuscript as a gift, a sign of gratitude for the Bibliography of N.S. Leskov. Thirty years: 1860–1889 which Bykov compiled and also for the work he's done as an editor for the 1889 Complete Leskov edition.

"I think it would be only fair to pass to you this re-worked version of The Life of a Peasant Woman which I renamed now into Amour in Lapotochki. Read this and do not judge me harsh. May be you'll be able to make use of it when better day for Russian peasants will come and there will be a renewed interest towards [this book]," Leskov has allegedly told him.

The fact that Leskov indeed was going to make changes to his 1863 original text was indisputable, for he wrote of this very intention in his foreword to the 1867 collection called The Novelets, Sketches and Stories. It was there that he promised that the book's 2nd volume will feature "an attempt at a peasant novel" called Amour in Lapotochki. But this re-worked version of The Life of a Peasant Woman never materialized – neither in the Vol.2 of Stories by M.Stebnitsky (1869), nor in its 1873 re-issue or in the 1889 Complete Leskov.

From Bykov's account it followed, though, that Leskov re-wrote his novel in the 1880s. The author's contemporaries insisted that such work could have been done much earlier, in the 1860s. Later scholars were doubting Bykov's tale in general as well as particular details of it, like that concerning the author's reading the original text (7 printer sheets) to his friends in one sitting – only to declare his intention to re-work it. It was only logical for Leskov to gather his friends to read them the new version of the text. The question why he's never published it (under the new title, which apparently appeared in 1867) remained unanswered.

In the mid-20th century Soviet versions of Complete Leskov Bykov-published version has been ignored. In fact, the whereabouts of Bykov's manuscript by this time have been unknown, apparently it has been lost. Yet, the comparative analysis of the two texts has been made. Changes that Leskov has made, were mostly editorial cuts: he removed numerous descriptions and side-plots, like the whole story of Nastya's tender relations with (part 1, chapter 3), the anecdote about a bell being dragged uphill (part 1, chapter 4), the story of the newly-wed's journey to Nastya's landlord (part 1, chapter 5). It looked indeed as if Leskov was trying to make the piece look more like a traditional novel, removing sketch-like aberrations he deemed superfluous. A lengthy epilogue, describing the life of the villagers after the abolition of serfdom has been removed too; perhaps for the author it looked dated. One large piece of text has been added to the original one (part 1, chapter 8): it dealt with "strange feelings" Nastya has had on her way from the local smith's house back to that of Prokudin, - an obvious attempt to add psychological touch to the description of his heroine's mental condition.
