= George Hanna (translator) =

British Communist and translator (1902–1966)

George Hanna Георгий Ханна
- Born: George Herbert Hanna; 1902
- Died: 1966 (aged 63–64)
- Resting place: Novodevichy Cemetery
- Occupation: Translator
- Writing career
- Period: 20th century
- Literary movement: Communism
- Political party: CPSU
- Other political affiliations: CPB

George Herbert Hanna (1902–1966, Russian: Георгий Вильямович Ханна) was a British Communist and translator.

== Life ==
Hanna was born in London, England on 31 Dec 1902. His parents were William Hanna and Harriet Eunice Green.

After emigrating to the Soviet Union in the early 1930s, Hanna worked for the Communist International. He was imprisoned during the 1940s, and after about 10 years in prison was released in 1957 and later rehabilitated. He was a fellow Gulag inmate to Lev Gumilev. He celebrated his release with a party at the Hotel Astoria in Gorky Street, Moscow. Sam Russell, Moscow correspondent of the Daily Worker attended the party. Hanna worked as a translator for the Foreign Languages Publishing House and Radio Moscow. He taught English at Maurice Thorez Moscow State Pedagogical Institute of Foreign Languages and worked for the Soviet Information Bureau. He was a member of the Communist Party of Britain and the Communist Party of the Soviet Union.

He translated a great deal of the works of Lenin, for example, his revisions of What Is to Be Done? were incorporated into the revised translation included in the English edition of Lenin's Complete Works. He also translated the science-fiction novels The Garin Death Ray by Aleksey Tolstoy and Andromeda: A Space-Age Tale by Ivan Efremov.

He was buried at Novodevichy Cemetery in Moscow.

== Books ==
- Rabinovich, D. (1955). Dmitry Shostakovich Composer. Translated by Hanna, George. Moscow: Foreign Languages Publishing House.
- Volkov, A. (1959). Earth and Sky. Translated by Hanna, George. Moscow: Foreign Languages Publishing House.
- Fundamentals of Soviet Criminal Legislation, the Judicial System and Criminal Court Procedure. Translated by Hanna, George. Moscow: Foreign Languages Publishing House. 1960.
- Outline History of the USSR. Translated by Hanna, George. Moscow: Foreign Languages Publishing House. 1960.
- A Short History of the USSR: Part I. Translated by Hanna, George. Moscow: Progress Publishers. 1963.
- Leskov, Nikolai (1960). Lefty: Being the Tale of Cross-Eyed Lefty of Tula and The Steel Flea. Translated by Hanna, George. Moscow: Progress Publishers.
- Leskov, Nikolai (1965). Katzer, J. (ed.). The Enchanted Wanderer and Other Stories. Translated by Hanna, George. Moscow: Foreign Languages Publishing House.
- Lunacharsky, A.; Kollontai, A.; Vorovsky, V.; Gorky, M.; Bonch-Bruyevich, V.; Bek, A.; Antonov, S.; Dangulov, S.; Drabkina, Y.; Ghil, S.; Aramilev, I.; Radischev, L.; Vinogradskaya, S. (1965). Hanna, George (ed.). About Lenin. Translated by Guralsky, J. Moscow: Progress Publishers.
- Lenin, Vladimir (1964). Hanna, George (ed.). Lenin: Collected Works. Vol. 22. Translated by Sdobnikov, Yuri. London: Lawrence & Wishart.
- Lenin, Vladimir (1972). Hanna, George (ed.). Lenin: Collected Works. Vol. 26. Translated by Sdobnikov, Yuri; Hanna, George. Moscow: Progress Publishers.
- Lenin, Vladimir (1974). Hanna, George (ed.). Lenin: Collected Works. Vol. 29. Moscow: Progress Publishers.
- Lenin, Vladimir (1974). Hanna, George (ed.). Lenin: Collected Works. Vol. 30. Moscow: Progress Publishers.
- Yefremov, Ivan (1990). Andromeda: A Space-Age Tale. Translated by Hanna, George. Moscow: Raduga Publishers. ISBN 5-05-002828-0.
- Tolstoy, Aleksey N. (1991). The Fox And The Thrush: A Russian Folk Tale. Translated by Hanna, George. Moscow: Raduga Publishers. ISBN 5-05-002832-9.
