= The Cathedral Folk =

1872 novel by Nikolai Leskov

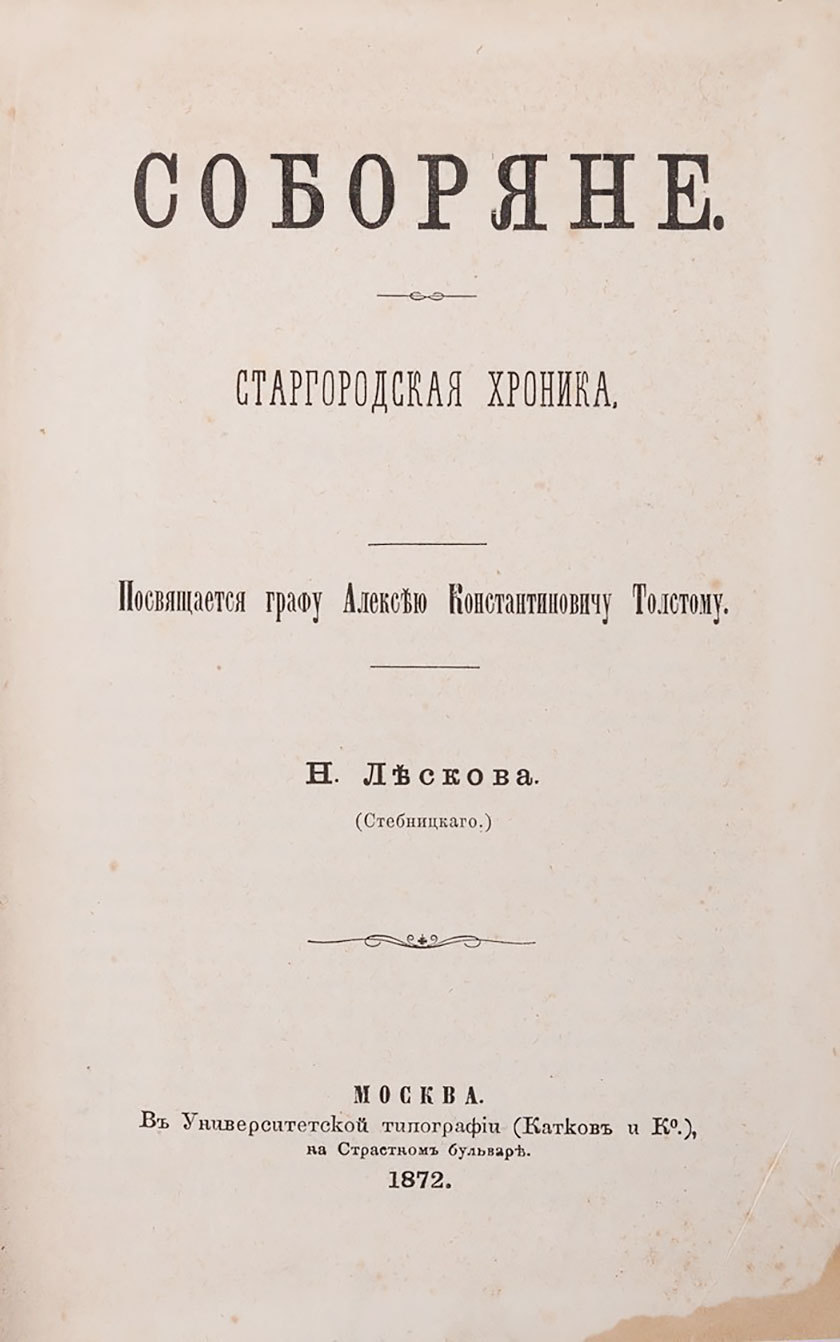
- Title page of the first edition
- Author: Nikolai Leskov
- Original title: Соборяне
- Language: Russian
- Publisher: The Russian Messenger
- Publication date: 1872
- Publication place: Russia
- English publication date: 1924

The Cathedral Folk (Russian: Соборяне, romanized: Soboryane), also translated as The Cathedral Clergy, is a novel by Nikolai Leskov, a series of "romantic chronicles" (as the author called them) of the fictional town of Stargorod. It is his only full-length novel translated into English. It was first published in 1872 in The Russian Messenger magazine and formed a trilogy with Old Years in Plodomasovo (1869) and A Decayed Family (1874).

== Background ==
Leskov started working on his "romantic chronicles" in January 1866. In 1867, Book 1 appeared in Otechestvennye Zapiski under the original title: Waiting for the Moving of the Water. The Romantic Chronicles. (Note: From the Gospel of John: "In these lay a multitude of them that were sick, blind, halt, withered, waiting for the moving of the water. (V, 4) For an angel of the Lord went down at certain seasons into the pool, and troubled the water: whosoever then first after the troubling of the waters stepped in was made whole, with whatsoever disease he was holden. (V, 5)) The publication was stopped after a row between Leskov and Andrey Krayevsky over the cuts that had been made. Then Literaturnaya Biblioteka started publishing the novel from the beginning, in its first two issues of 1868 (as Bozhedomy), but then stopped. Only in 1872 did The Russian Messenger publish the full text of a revised version of the novel as The Cathedral Clergy.

In its original version (the one published in Otechestvennye Zapiski), the novel dealt more with the life of Stargorod in general, focusing on its starovery community, but also describing in detail the ordinary, non-religious people's spiritual leanings. Book I looked more like background for the story of Savely Tuberozov, the novel's main character. In the Russian Messenger version, most of the side plots, which had little to do with protopope Tuberozov and his colleagues, have been cut. Konstantin Pizonsky and Platonida, who featured prominently in the chronicles, disappeared from the latter version and resurfaced as the main characters of the short story "Kotin the He-Cow and Platonida," which was included in the collection Novelets and Short Stories by M. Stebnitsky.

== Plot ==
Archpriest (protopope) Savely Tuberozov is a spiritual leader of a Sobor (cathedral) in a provincial town of Stargorod, supported by Father Zakharia Benefaktov and the deacon Akhilla Desnitsyn. He firmly believes in his spiritual and social mission, and, unwilling to make compromises, comes into conflict with his church seniors, as well as the local authorities. As a young man, he came to Stargorod to combat the Old Believers, but he gave up because he realized that he had to take bribes and denounce the Old Believers to the authorities. At the time the novel opens, Tuberozov is an old man, depressed by his inability to turn the Orthodoxy of the townspeople into an active faith. Tuberozov's main enemies are the corrupt local officials and the atheist schoolteacher Prepotensky. Tuberozov's mission of guiding the townspeople is hardened by the mischiefs of the deacon Akhilla.

Tuberozov's downfall starts after the government inspector Bornovolokov arrives to Stargorod. Bornovolokov's secretary is Izmail Termosesov, an amoral ex-nihilist, and he wants to build himself a career by any means. Tuberozov makes the speech, accusing the local officials of religious hypocrisy, exploiting peasants and abusing the rural areas. Termosesov denounces Tuberozov to the authorities as a dangerous revolutionary. Tuberozov gets removed from his post, falls ill and dies. Akhilla tries to defend the memory of his teacher, but dies himself in a freak accident. Father Zakharia dies of natural causes soon afterwards.

== Literary significance and criticism ==
These early stories were followed by a series of "Chronicles" of the imaginary town of Stargorod, which may be called a Russian Barchester, as an English reviewer has honoured Leskov on account of one of these with the title of a Russian Trollope. They form a trilogy – Old Years in Plodomasovo (1869), Soboryane (Cathedral, or rather Minster, folk, 1872), and A Decayed Family (1875). The second of these chronicles is the most widely popular of all Leskov's works. It deals with the Stargorod clergy. Its head, the Archpriest Tuberozov, is one of Leskov's most successful and noble portraits of a "just man". The deacon Akhila is his greatest character creation. It is one of the most wonderful of the whole portrait - gallery of Russian literature . The comic escapades and unconscious mischief – making of this enormous, exuberant, very unspiritual, and quite childlike deacon and the constant reprimands his behaviour draws from Father Tuberozov are familiar to every Russian reader, and Akhila himself is a universal favourite. But Soboryane is not at all points representative of their author – it is too leisurely, too uneventful, too placid to be really quite Leskovian . The very idea of a comparison with Trollope would be ridiculous in reference to one of his more typical tales.

— D. S. Mirsky. Contemporary Russian Literature: From 1881 to 1925

The novel is also notable for the skaz techniques of Tuberozov's diary, for its "vigorous and distinctive style", bookish turn of phrases, Slavonicisms and biblical quotations.

However, some critics, who judge the Russian novel by the criteria of Dostoevskian or Tolstoian novel of ideas, complain about the triviliazation of issues such as the struggle of materialism and religion in The Cathedral Folk and the novel's comic tone. Others dislike the replacement of a "real" traditional well-structured plot of a classic "realist" 19th-century novel and its balanced portraiture with a "series of anecdotes". This is because Leskov tried to write not a traditional novel, but a chronicle, a fictional history of Stargorod, which was intended as a microcosm of the old Russia (Rus'). The name of Stargorod literally translates as "Old Town", and it symbolic significance is evoked through a series of parallels with early Russian literature and folklore. Tuberozov is modelled on Archpriest Avvakum, Father Zakharia is in the tradition of saints, who believed in non-resistance to evil, while Akhilla is presented as one of the heroes of Russian folk epic, characters and episodes with them may be folklorized.

Some criticized the novel for its crudely one-sided portrayal between belief and doubt and disbelief. But although portraits of the ex-nihilist Termosesov and his employer Bornovolokov are unrelievedly black, all the positive characters of the novel have clear failings (although treated indulgently), and Leskov criticises not only the foreigners and left radicals (nihilists), but also the Russian Orthodox Church for its bureaucratic consistory system and too close relations with the State. Although Leskov considered himself a "friend" of the Church and thought that it can still be revived, the end of the novel is deeply pessimistic, and few years later Leskov will be disappointed in the Church.

== English editions ==
- The Cathedral Folk, translated by Isabel F. Hapgood, John Lane, 1924.
  - The Cathedral Folk, translated by Isabel F. Hapgood, Greenwood Press, 1971.
  - The Cathedral Folk, translated by Isabel F. Hapgood, Hyperion Press, 1977.
- The Cathedral Clergy: A Chronicle, translated by Margaret Winchell, Slavica Publishers, 2010. ISBN 0-89357-373-6
