= Vasily Avenarius =

Russian writer and memoirist (1839–1923)

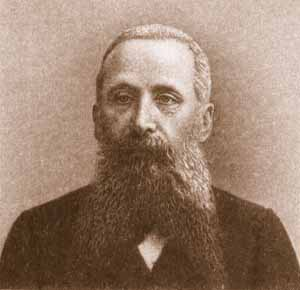
- Born: Wilhelm Heinrich Appolonius Avenarius; 10 October 1839; Saint Petersburg, Russian Empire
- Died: 9 November 1923 (aged 84); Petrograd, USSR
- Occupations: writer, memoirist

Vasily Petrovich Avenarius (Russian: Василий Петрович Авенариус, born Wilhelm Heinrich Appolonius Avenarius 10 October 1839 – 9 November 1923) was a Russian writer and memoirist.

== Biography ==
Born on 10 October 1839, in Tsarskoye Selo, to a Lutheran pastor, he graduated from the Saint Petersburg University to join first the Russian Interior Ministry and later the Office of the Institutions of Empress Maria. His first two novels, the anti-nihilist The Modern Idyll (Современная идиллия, 1865), and The Passing Craze (Поветрие, 1867), were deemed and 'reactionary' by the influential democratic press. Shocked by the almost unanimous negative response, Avenarius turned away from political issues and from then on have been publishing only books for children, as well as biographies (also adapted for the young readership), notably of Pushkin and Gogol. Several of his books (including The Book of the Kiev Bogatyrs, 1875, The Tale of a Bumble-Bee, 1879, What the Room Tells, 1880, and Fairytales for Children, 1885), enjoyed steady success and numerous re-issues. Avenarius also published several historical novels and, later in his life, memoirs ("Bits of Memories from Childhood", "Before Dawn", "For Thirty Years"). He died in Petrograd, 9 November 1923 and is interred in the Smolensky Lutheran Cemetery.
