= No Way Out (novel) =

1864 novel by Nikolai Leskov

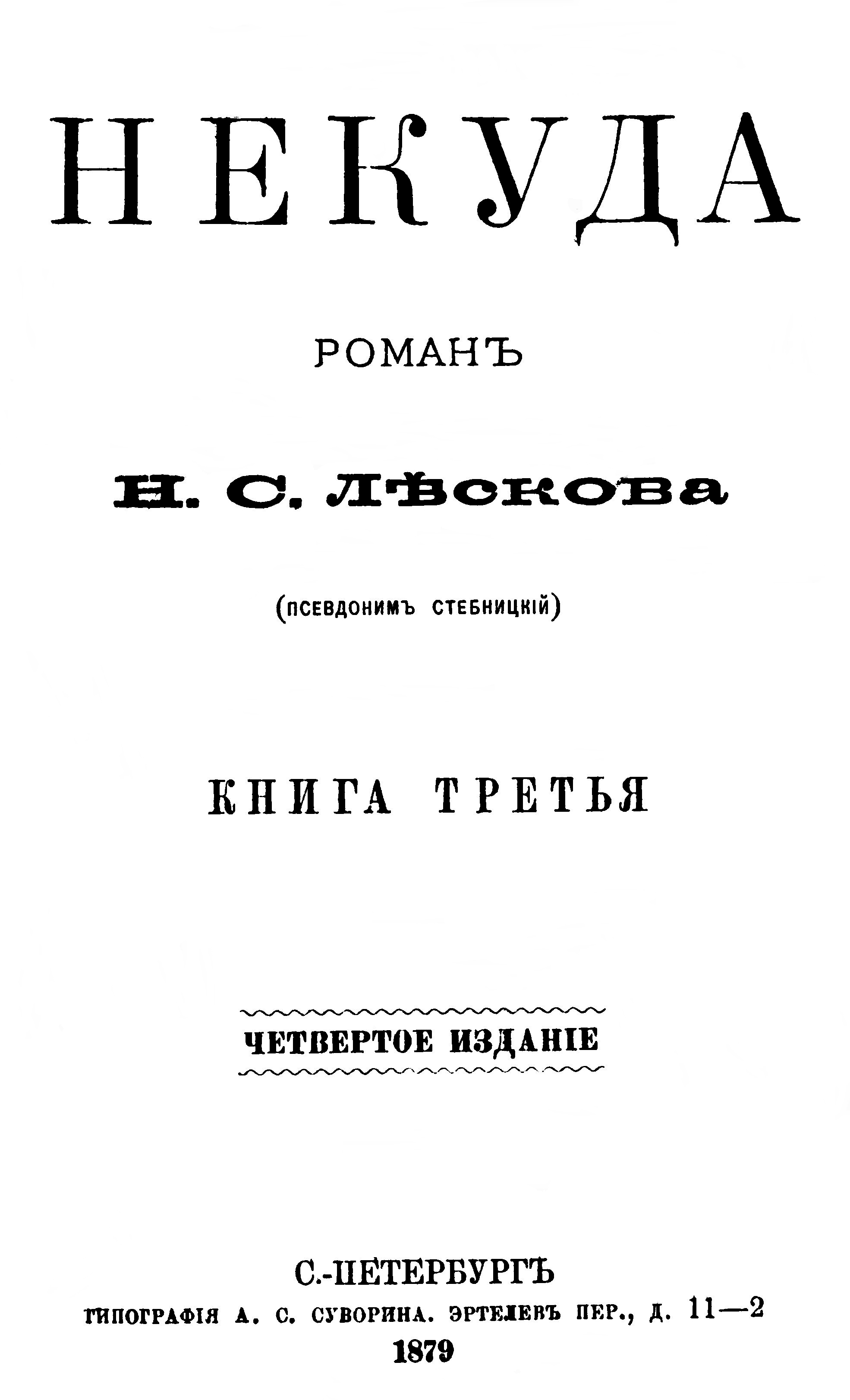
- 1879 title page
- Author: Nikolai Leskov
- Original title: Некуда
- Language: Russian
- Publication date: 1864
- Publication place: Russia
- Media type: Print (Paperback & Hardback)

No Way Out (Russian: Не́куда, romanized: Nekuda) is an anti-nihilist novel by Nikolai Leskov, published in 1864 under the pseudonym M.Stebnitsky in Biblioteka Dlya Chteniya. The original epigraph ("The slow one will be God-provided, the quick one will run up himself to grab. A proverb") has been later removed. During the author’s lifetime the novel was re-issued five times: in 1865, 1867, 1879, 1887 and 1889.

== Synopsis ==
The novel tells the story of young and naïve European Socialist Vasily (Wilhelm) Rainer who comes to Russia to somehow apply his rootless, artificial ideas to the local reality. The action takes place in houses of state officials and merchants, in literary circles of Moscow and Saint Petersburg, in editorial rooms, and Polish revolutionaries’ headquarters. Among those surrounding Rainer are some honest people (like Liza Bakhareva, another character who’s been shown by Leskov with great sympathy), but in general the 'nihilist' community is being portrayed in the novel as a bunch of amoral crooks for whom high ideals serve as mere means to their own ends; such characters (Arapov, Beloyartsev, Zavulonov, Krasin) the author has treated with open disgust.

== Reception ==
No Way Out scandalized critics of the radical left who discovered that for most of the characters real life prototypes could be found, and its central figure, Beloyartsev, was obviously a caricature of author and social activist Vasily Sleptsov. All this seemed to confirm the view, now rooted in the Russian literary community, that Leskov was a right-wing, 'reactionary' author. In April Dmitry Pisarev wrote in his "The Walk In the Russian Literature Garden" (Russkoye slovo, 1865, #3) review: "Can there be found anywhere in Russia any other magazine, except for The Russian Messenger, that would venture on publishing anything written by and signed as, Stebnitsky? Could there be found one single honest writer in Russia who'd be so careless, so indifferent as to his reputation, so as to contribute to a magazine that adorns itself with novels and novelets by Stebnitsky?" The social democrat-controlled press started spreading rumours that No Way Out had been 'commissioned' by the Interior Ministry's 3rd Department. What Leskov condemned as "a vicious libel" caused great harm to his career: popular journals boycotted him, while Mikhail Katkov of the conservative The Russian Messenger greeted him as a political ally.

Presenting the copy of the novel's second edition to historian, publicist and editor Pyotr Schebalsky, Leskov enclosed a short entry, summarizing his view on the novel that made him both famous and infamous.

The No Way Out novel is my second prosaic work, preceded only by Musk-ox. The novel was being written hastily and was going to print literally from scraps of manuscripts, some scribbled by pencil, in the printing-works. Its success was solid. The first edition has been sold out in just three months and the final copies of it were being sold at 8-10 rubles a piece. So it's No Way Out that is to be blamed for my modest fame and the abyss of most aggravating insults I had to endure. My opponents were alleging and are still prepared to repeat it that the novel had been commissioned by the 3rd Department (see my Paris letters on this matter). The truth is, none of my book had been ever throttled by censors with such zeal frenzy as this one. After the part 1 has been released Turunov (Note: M.N.Turunov was the Chairman of the Saint Petersburgh censorship committee in 1864-1865.) appointed Vesealgo to check censor Deroberti. Then he ordered the proof-read lists to be taken to him by Veselago and was himself carving whole chapters out of it... I mas on the verge of madness and was cursing the day when I decided to start this cursed thing...

In the early 20th century the attitude in Russia towards this novel started to change. Maxim Gorky wrote: "In No Way Out almost every characters is ridiculous or evil, most are ignorant of reality, garrulous, self-important types, who indeed have nowhere to go. But what was more important to Leskov was to show among this pathetic, dishonest mob real heroes whom he could sympathise [with], like that of Rainer. Rainer calls himself a Socialist, bravely promotes Socialism in Russia and dies as a hero in the Polish uprising in 1863. Leskov surrounded Rainer with a halo of gallantry and saintliness." Leskov himself wrote later: "For all the gallery of vile nihilists I've created there were heroes like Rainer, Liza and Pomada – kind of characters none of the nihilist sympathizer author would be able to come up with." D.S. Mirsky too expressed bewilderment at how Leskov, after his first novel No Way Out, could have been seriously regarded as 'vile and libelous reactionary', when in reality (according to the critic) "the principal Socialist characters in the book were represented as little short of saints."
