= The Sealed Angel =

Story by Nikolai Leskov

- Author: Nikolai Leskov
- Original title: Запечатленный ангел
- Language: Russian
- Publisher: The Russian Messenger
- Publication date: 1873
- Publication place: Russia
- Media type: Print (Paperback & Hardback)

The Sealed Angel (Russian: Запечатленный ангел) is a story by Nikolai Leskov, written in 1872 and first published in the No.1, January 1873 issue of The Russian Messenger. The story concerns a group of Old Believers whose revered icon of an angel is confiscated by officials and sealed with wax.

== Background ==
Nikolai Leskov developed a great interest in the Raskol history and movement in the early 1860s. His attitude towards it changed over time from very cautious to openly appreciative, as he came to see the Old Believers as keepers of old Russian artistic traditions which otherwise would have disappeared without a trace, lacking governmental support. Leskov got interested in the art of icon-painting after having met the iconographer Nikita Racheiskov (d. 1886), whom he commemorated later by the posthumous essay "Of the Artist Man Nikita and Those Brought up by Him" (Novoye vremya, 1886, December 25). It was in Racheiskov's studio that Leskov, while studying Ikonopisny podlinnik (a hand-written manual of icon-painting), wrote The Sealed Angel. The story which came out at the time when the academic studies of icon-painting began, influenced and contributed to the process, according to scholar I. Serman.

Leskov remarked later that The Sealed Angel was his only work that avoided any editorial cuts, explaining this by Mikhail Katkov's men being "too busy to pay much notice". Apparently, there was another reason. The Sealed Angel, being close to a Christmas story in style and form, was warmly received at the Russian Court. Empress consort Maria Alexandrovna and Tsar Alexander II reportedly liked it, which must have kept both editors and censors off.

=== Finale ===
The story's finale, where the Old Believers' community all of a sudden return to mainstream Orthodoxy, was criticized as being unnatural. Ten years later Leskov conceded that, while the story itself was mostly based on real facts, the ending was made up. What happened in reality he revealed in Chapter 41 of The Pechersk Antics set of memoir sketches.

As my story The Sealed Angel appeared in Katkov's The Russian Messenger, some periodicals, condescendingly giving me credit for having some talent, stressed the fact that such a story had indeed taken place – in the times when the Kiev bridge (the old one, obviously) was being constructed. The story, mind you, is that of an icon "sealed" by officials so as to be transferred to an Orthodox monastery, and of a group of Old Believers, those to whom it belonged, which retrieved the icon by replacing it with another, during the Easter Matins. This feat involved another one: a man crossed the river over stretched chain, in times of violent ice break-up. […] The setting of The Sealed Angel... is indeed reminiscent of Kiev, which can be explained by my being rather used to Kiev backdrops. But no Old Believer man has ever crossed Dnieper by chain with an icon. What did happen in reality – a stonemason from Kaluga – and chains indeed have been stretched already, - made it over Dnieper to the Chernigov bank during the Easter morning service, walking a chain like a tightrope. It was not, though, an icon that he'd made this venture for, but vodka which in those times sold much cheeper on the Chernigov side. With a barrel of vodka hung down his neck and armed with a pole for maintaining balance, this intrepid traveler indeed safely walked a chain over to Kiev side with his cargo which has been promptly consumed by his comrades, in celebration of the Easter. This brave expedition has indeed taken place and I used the fact in the story to highlight the desperate Russian prowess, but since the goal of the expedition had been different, The Seal Angel is, of course, fiction.

== English translations ==
- The Sealed Angel from Russian Sketches, Chiefly of Peasant Life. Translated by Beatrix Tollemache.
- K. A. Lantz (1984)
- David McDuff (1988)
- Richard Pevear and Larissa Volokhonsky (2013)
- Donald Rayfield (2020)

== Music ==
The story became the basis for the 1988 Russian-language choral work The Sealed Angel, by Rodion Shchedrin.
