= The Amazon (novella) =

Novel by Nikolai Leskov

- Author: Nikolai Leskov
- Original title: Воительница
- Language: Russian
- Publisher: Otechestvennye zapiski
- Publication date: 1866
- Publication place: Russia
- Media type: Print (Paperback & Hardback)
- Preceded by: Lady Macbeth of the Mtsensk District (1865)
- Followed by: Old Years in Plodomasovo (1869)

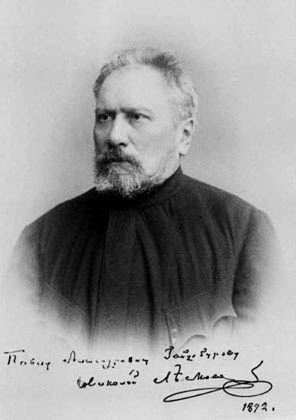
Nikolai Leskov, 1892

The Amazon (Russian: Вои′тельница, romanized: Voitelnitsa; translated also as The Warrior Woman) is a short novel by Nikolai Leskov, first published in the April (vol.1; No.7) 1866 issue of Otechestvennye Zapiski, with a dedication to the artist Mikhail Mikeshin (with whom the author was friends at the time). It was included into the collection (vol. 1, 1967) Novelets, Sketches and Stories by M.Stebnitsky (Stebnitsky being Leskov's pseudonym) and later into the Works by N.S. Leskov (1889), in a slightly revised version. The epigraph, "The whole of my life has been a set of lessons, of which my death is but another one," comes from the lyrical drama Lucius (Люций) by Apollon Maykov (Seneka's words in part 1 of it).

== Synopsis ==
Domna Platonovna, a forceful and industrious woman who seems to be in contact with half of Saint Petersburg, is in a state of permanent war with the outside world. Supplying people with laces (the major item of her trade) but also with all kinds of services (like setting marriages, not to speak of less formal liaisons), she greatly resents people's ingratitude, as she sees it. To illustrate how badly people treat her, she tells the narrator the story of Lekanida Petrovna, a beautiful and sensitive woman who, having left her provincial husband, came to the capital hoping to find her happiness here, only to be forced into prostitution, by Domna Platonovna herself.

The narrator is baffled: this 'warrior woman' is by no means vile, she's just misguided, lacking basic ideas about what's right and wrong. Curious as to what circumstances might have turned a human being (she once apparently must have been) into such a pathetic 'fat-hearted' creature, he tries to draw from her some kind of confession, but the stories she tells him about her past are comically bizarre and explain little. Some things are for certain, though: the meaning of the word "love" is totally foreign to her. And her only moral defect, as far as she is concerned, is exceptionally sound sleep. She claims there's just one sin she'd ever committed, that of having inadvertently swapped husbands with her godmother, and blames for it her sleeping habits again.

Five years later the narrator, visiting a hospital, meets Domna Platonovna, who is now a nurse. She is out of her 'business', looks shabby and is on the brink of madness. It turns out that she'd fallen in love with a 21-year-old man (currently in jail for some petty crime) and gave him all of her property. She spends the next month praying, asking God to relieve her from this horrible disease, 'love'; then dies, from what seems to be "life force extinction." Before her death she gives the narrator the last two things she's been left with, her pillow and a can of jam, to be sent to her jailed sweetheart.
