= The Russian Messenger =

Three Russian magazines

Russkiy vestnik
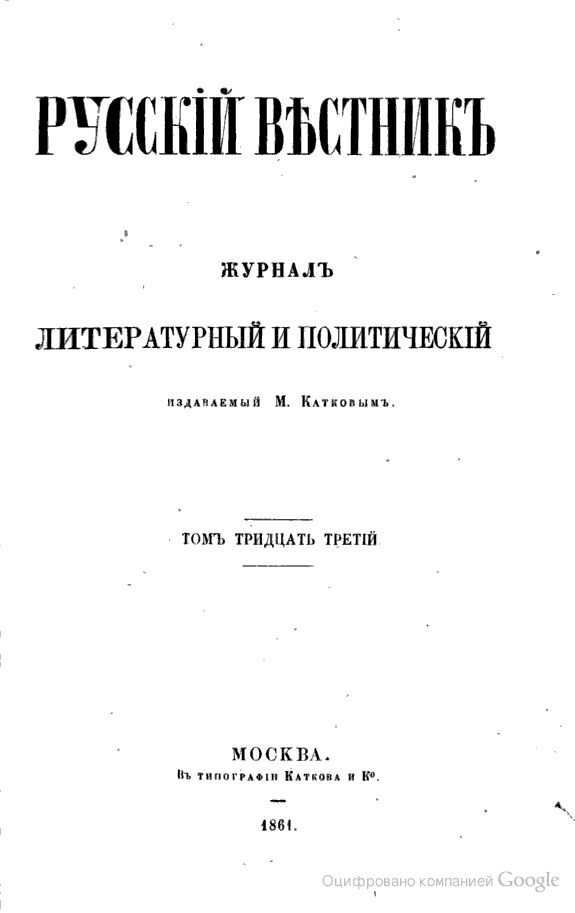
- Cover of the Russian Messenger, volume 33
- Frequency: Monthly
- Founded: 1808
- Final issue: 1906
- Country: Russia
- Based in: St. Petersburg
- Language: Russian

The Russian Messenger or Russian Herald (Russian: Ру́сский ве́стник, romanized: Russkiy Vestnik, Pre-reform Russian: Русскій Вѣстникъ) was the title of three magazines published in Russia during the 19th century and early 20th century.

== Russian Messenger period I and II ==
The first publishing period of the Russian Messenger falls within the period 1808 to 1820, and 1824. Relocated to Moscow, the monthly journal was edited by writer Sergey Glinka. It was sponsored by the minister and adjutant general Count Fyodor Rostopchin and its orientation classified as patriotic monarchist.

The second publishing period falls in the years from 1841 to 1844 and appeared in Saint Petersburg. On its creation, the publisher, editor, journalist and publicist Nikolay Gretsch and writer, playwright, journalist and historian Nikolai Polevoy were involved. Another employee was the historian Ivan Snegiryov.

== Russian Messenger period III ==
The third publishing period of the Russian Messenger falls in the years from 1856 to 1887, appeared in Moscow, and 1887 to 1906, appeared in St. Petersburg. Unlike its predecessors, the magazine was no longer limited to historical and military articles, as well as general political themes, but saw itself as a literary journal and quickly became one of the most influential magazines in the second half of the 19th century in Russia.

The magazine was founded in 1856 by a group of liberal writers and scholars, among them as an editor Mikhail Katkov, but also the professor of Moscow University Pyotr Kudryavtsev.

In 1887 it was bought by Count Friedrich von Berg and moved to Saint Petersburg, but later he abandoned the magazine due to the lack of finances, and eventually the magazine was shut down.

=== Legacy ===
The magazine inspired Al Nafais Al Asriyyah, an Arabic literary and political magazine which was published in Jerusalem between 1908 and 1923.

=== Featured titles ===
- Mikhail Saltykov-Shchedrin
  - Provincial Sketches (1856–1857)
  - Pazukhin's Death (1857)
- Ivan Turgenev
  - On the Eve (1860)
  - Fathers and Sons (1862)
- Leo Tolstoy
  - The Cossacks (1863)
  - War and Peace (1865–1869)
  - Anna Karenina (1873–1877)
- Fyodor Dostoyevsky
  - Crime and Punishment (1866)
  - The Idiot (1868)
  - Demons (1871–1872)
  - The Brothers Karamazov (1879–1880)
- Nikolai Leskov
  - The Cathedral Folk (1872)
  - The Sealed Angel (1873)
- Helena Blavatsky
  - From the Caves and Jungles of Hindostan (1879–1886)
