= Ludwik Leonid Słonimski =

Russian journalist (1849–1918)

Leonid Ludwik Słonimski
- Людвиг-Леонид Слонимский
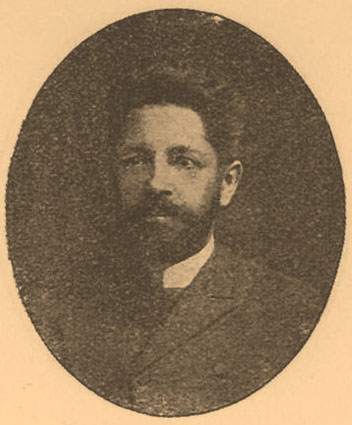
- Born: 1 November 1849; Warsaw, Congress Poland, Russian Empire
- Died: 1918 (aged 68–69); Petrograd, Russia
- Resting place: Literatorskiye Mostki, Saint Petersburg
- Occupations: Journalist; lawyer; editor
- Spouse: Faina Vengerova (m. 1880)

Ludwik Leonid Słonimski (Russian: Леонид [Людвиг] Зиновьевич Слонимский, romanized: Leonid [Lyudvig] Zinovyevich Slonimsky, 1 November 1849 – 1918) was a Polish–Russian journalist, publicist, economist and lawyer of Jewish origin, the son of Hebrew scientist and publisher Hayyim Selig Slonimski.

== Career ==
Słonimski was born in Warsaw on 1 November 1849 to Hayyim Selig Słonimski and Sara (Salomea) Stern. His father was a mathematician, astronomer, publisher of Hebrew-language press, and an inventor. His older brother, Stanisław Słonimski, was a physician and the father of the poet Antoni Słonimski. His younger brother, Józef Słonimski, was a polyglot and the creator of a system of shorthand and a universal language, linguo romane universale.

He spent his childhood in Tomaszów Mazowiecki, then attended secondary school in Warsaw and Zhytomyr, where the family moved in 1862. He later took up law studies at the University of Kyiv, which he completed in 1872.

Słonimski started publishing articles on law and jurisprudence in Sudebny Vestnik (Court Herald) in Saint Petersburg in 1872. From 1875 to 1879 he was the head of the Foreign Policy section in Russkiy Mir, and for some time co-edited it with Yevgeny Rapp. After a short stint with the Slovo magazine, in 1881 he joined the newspaper Poryadok (Order), then succeeded Valentin Korsh as its Foreign Policies editor. In late 1882 Słonimski became a member of the Severny Vestnik staff where his essays on economics soon started to appear regularly; in 1883 he became the head of this magazine's Foreign Review section.

Słonimski lectured at the St Petersburg Juridical Society. He criticized Russia's financial policy, Marxist economics, and opposed the narodniks, while supporting obshchina. Among the issues he regularly returned to were the theory of progress, usury, the rights of mentally ill patients, the legal rights of Jews in Russia and Leo Tolstoy's philosophy. He also published numerous historical essays, including those on Napoleon I, Oliver Cromwell, Alexander I and Nicholas I. Later in his life he co-edited (with Viktor Fausek) the Brockhaus and Efron Encyclopedic Dictionary.

== Family ==
In 1880 he married Faina Vengerova, the daughter of the Jewish writer Paulina née Epstein and Afanasii Vengerov, director of the Commercial Bank in the city of Lubny, and the sister of literary critic Zinaida Vengerova, pianist Isabelle Vengerova, and literary historian Semyon Vengerov. In 1881 both converted to Orthodoxy in order to spare their children the fate of second-class citizens; the family did not cultivate Jewish traditions and raised their children as Russians.

They had five children who survived into adulthood:

- Aleksandr, a literary scholar and Pushkin specialist;
- Yulia, a writer, dance critic, and promoter of puppet theatre;
- Nicolas, a musicologist and conductor;
- Vladimir, a gifted musician who died prematurely; and
- Mikhail, a writer and supporter of the Bolsheviks.

== Sources ==
- "Слонимский, Леонид-Людвиг Зиновьевич" . Brockhaus and Efron Encyclopedic Dictionary (in Russian). 1906.
