= Yulia Slonimskaya Sazonova =

Russian actor, puppeteer, theater and dance critic (1884-1957)

- Born: Yulia Leonidovna Slonimskaya; 19 September 1884; Saint Petersburg, Russia
- Died: 18 November 1957 (aged 73); Paris, France
- Other names: Iulie Slonimskaia, Julia Sazonova Slonimskaya, Julia Slonimskaia, Julie Sazonova, Julie Sazonouva, Yulia Leonidovna Sazonova-Slonim, Yulia Leonidovna Slonimskaya, Yuliya Leonidovna Sazonova
- Citizenship: Russian, French
- Years active: 1905-1950
- Known for: marionette theater, puppet theory, and dance critique
- Partner: Nicolas Millioti (during 1920–1921)

Yulia Leonidovna Sazonova (Note: Russian: Юлия Леонидовна Сазонова (Слонимская).) (née Slonimskaya; 19 September 1884 – 18 November 1957) was a Russian-born writer, theater critic and historian, actress, and puppeteer. Fleeing Russia after the October Revolution, she moved to France and continued her craft. She wrote and performed marionette shows in Europe and was one of the most prolific women dance and theater critics of the first half of the twentieth century. When World War II broke out, she moved to Portugal and later the United States, before returning to Paris.

== Early life ==
Yulia Leonidovna Slonimskaya, known as Ditia, was born on 19 September 1884 in Saint Petersburg, in the Russian Empire to Faina Afanasievna (née Vengerova) and Leonid Zinovevich Slonimsky. The couple had at least 8 children, though only four survived, after Faina lost a set of triplets in 1887. Ditia was the second child in the family, after Alexander (born 1881) and was followed by Nicolas (born 1894), Vladimir (1895–1915), and Michael (1897–1972). Slonimskaya’s father was an editor of the Messenger of Europe and had trained to be a lawyer. Her mother had trained to be a medical doctor, though she did not complete her studies, and came from an artistic and literary family, including the pianist Isabella Vengerova, historian Semyon Vengerov, and Zinaida Vengerova, a noted translator and specialist on English and French literature. Her maternal grandmother, Pauline (née Epstien) Vengeroff, had written a book about Jewish family life, Rememberings, in 1913, noted for being an early work giving a woman’s perspective.

Though her maternal family had strong Jewish roots, Slonimskaya's mother, denied her heritage, often causing confusion for the siblings. Raised in Saint Petersburg, Slonimskaya attended the Bestuzhev Courses and, at her mother's insistence, pursued mathematical studies, though she also studied dance at the Imperial Ballet School and drama at the Imperial Theater School. After completing a course at the Theater School under Vladimir Davydov and Konstantin Stanislavski between 1905 and 1906, Slonimskaya was given the lead in a play written by Evgeny Chirikov, Jews in the theater company of Lidia Yavorskaya. During the performance, she met the actor, Peter Sazonov, who she would later marry in 1908. Graduating after completion of her mathematics studies, Slonimskaya chose to focus on ballet and acting and was soon touring the provinces with productions and writing about history of dance and theater.

== Career ==
After her marriage, in the early 1910s, Sazonova began publishing articles on Russian puppet theater and critiques of ballet and ballet history in the magazine, Apollo (Russian: Аполлон), challenging theories that they originated as art form of elites. Instead, she argued that the roots were in festivals and folk culture. In 1915, she wrote an analysis of Alexander Ostrovsky's work for the Imperial Theater Yearbook in which she argued that his plays could not be evaluated on the basis of the words alone, but that one must look for the symbolism behind the words to find the struggle for the human soul.

In 1916, Sazonova staged an opulent production of The Forces of Love in Magic at the cabaret, "Comedian’s Halt" in Saint Petersburg. The play, based on a seventeenth-century French work, was jointly created by Sazonova and her husband and featured costumes and scenery designed by famous designers and music by noted musicians. That same year, she published an article evaluating marionettes in Apollo, which provided substantial historical information on the craft. In spite of the war situations, the Sazonovs tried to introduce the innovations being created in the craft to Russia over the next few years, but by 1920, Sazonova fled. She first went to the Crimea, where she met the artist Nicolas Millioti. The two began an affair and Sazonova discovered she was pregnant. She fled to Constantinople and then arrived in Sofia in 1921, where she gave birth to Millioti's son, Dmitri Petrovich Sazonov, giving him her husband’s name.

By 1923, the couple were in Paris and Sazonova had begun staging marionette plays again. One of Sazonova's first productions was a shadow play based on a traditional Turkish theme produced in 1924 by Natalia Goncharova. Between 1925 and 1926, she was extremely ill, after developing an infection as the result of an appendectomy. The experience changed her outlook on life in general, but specifically on art, which from that point forward, she maintained that traditions were improved by a fusion of cultural experiences. She maintained that people living in exile viewed their own cultures with an enhanced lens, because the interaction of cultures enhanced the best parts of diverse traditions and believed that censorship harmed artistic creation. By 1926, she had recovered sufficiently to take her puppet theater on the road, where her small wooden marionettes performed for the first time in The Hague.

By 1930, Sazonova was writing works evaluating the performances of Sergei Diaghilev, La Chorégraphie des ballets de Diaghilew, for the literary journal Čisla, reviewed the work of Anna Pavlova in a work of the same name for La Revue Musicale in 1931 and in 1937, published La Vie de la danse. Du ballet comique de La Reine á Icare, in which she analyzed the transmission of ballet from France to Russia and then back to France and the impact Serge Lifar had in that multi-layered process. Sazonova was one of the most recognized women critics of dance in Paris in the first half of the twentieth century, publishing articles in La Nouvelle Revue Française and La Revue Musicale on a regular basis.

With the outbreak of World War II, Sazonova moved to Portugal and then to the United States. In spite of her limited skill with English, she found work as a teacher and continued writing. She returned to France in 1955 and was reunited with Millioti and her son, who were living in Paris.

== Death and legacy ==
Sazonova died on 18 November 1957 and was buried in the Russian cemetery of Saint Genevieve-de-Bois, near Paris.
