= Russkiy Mir (St. Petersburg newspaper, 1871–1880) =

Russian newspaper

- Type: Daily
- Publisher: Mikhail Chernyayev, Pavel Viskovatov, Fyodor Berg, Evgeny Rapp
- Editor: Mikhail Chernyayev
- Founded: 1871
- Ceased publication: 1880
- Headquarters: Saint Petersburg, Russian Empire

Russkiy Mir (Russian: Русский мир, Russian World) (Note: Not to be confused with a weekly newspaper of the same name published in 1859-1863 in Saint Petersburg by Fyodor Stellovsky and edited by Alexander Gieroglifov) was a daily Russian newspaper published in Saint Petersburg in 1871–1880. Its publishers Mikhail Chernyayev, Vissarion Komarov, Pavel Viskovatov, and Fyodor Berg were also its co-editors, alongside Dmitry Stakheyev and later Evgeny Rapp.

Launched on 1 September 1871 by the army general Mikhail Chernyayev who'd just left the Ministry of Defense in defiantly anti-reformist mood, it was originally a conservative publication. Regarded as the stronghold of the 'Old Russia party', its position "could be seen as parallel to that of the British Tories of the time... What it opposed apparently were not the Alexander II's reforms as such, but the fact that the landowners and the gentry had been denied the leading role in the new developments," the Brockhaus and Efron Encyclopedic Dictionary argued.

In 1877, as Evgeny Rapp became its editor-in-chief, the newspaper took a more liberal stance, with Semyon Vengerov and Nikolai Minsky becoming its active contributors and Ludwig Slonimsky taking charge of the foreign policy section. It started to publish literary supplements, then merged with Birzhevoy Vestnik (Stock Exchange Herald) and in January 1880 changed its name to Birzhevye Vedomosti (Stock Exchange News).
