= Carex xiphium =

Scientific classification
- Kingdom: Plantae
- Clade: Tracheophytes
- Clade: Angiosperms
- Clade: Monocots
- Clade: Commelinids
- Order: Poales
- Family: Cyperaceae
- Genus: Carex
- Species: C. xiphium

Binomial name
- Carex xiphium Kom.

Species of plant in the genus Carex

Carex xiphium is a species of sedge in the family Cyperaceae, native to the Russian Far East, Manchuria, and the Korean Peninsula. Its chromosome number is 2n = 56.
