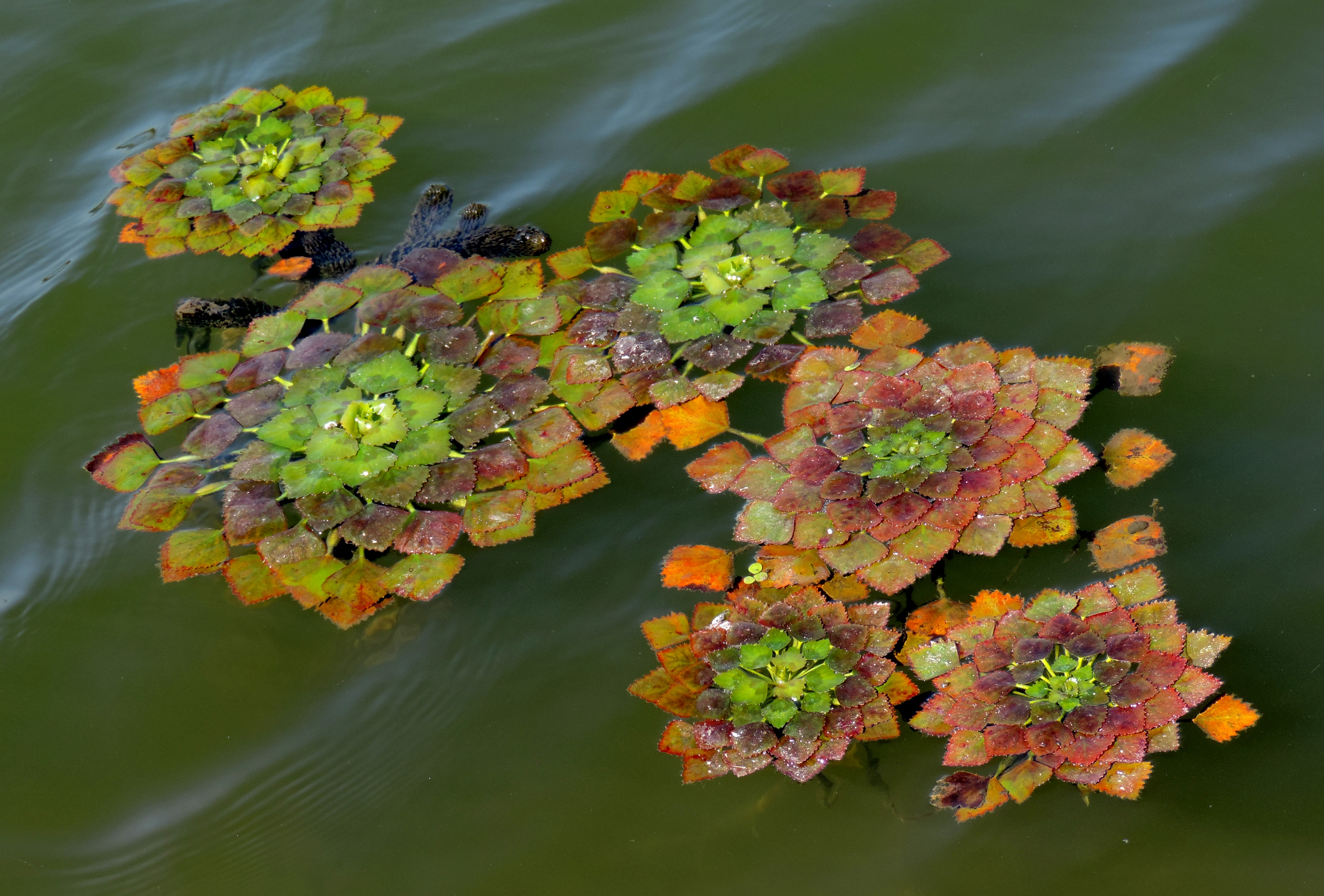
- Rosettes of floating leaves
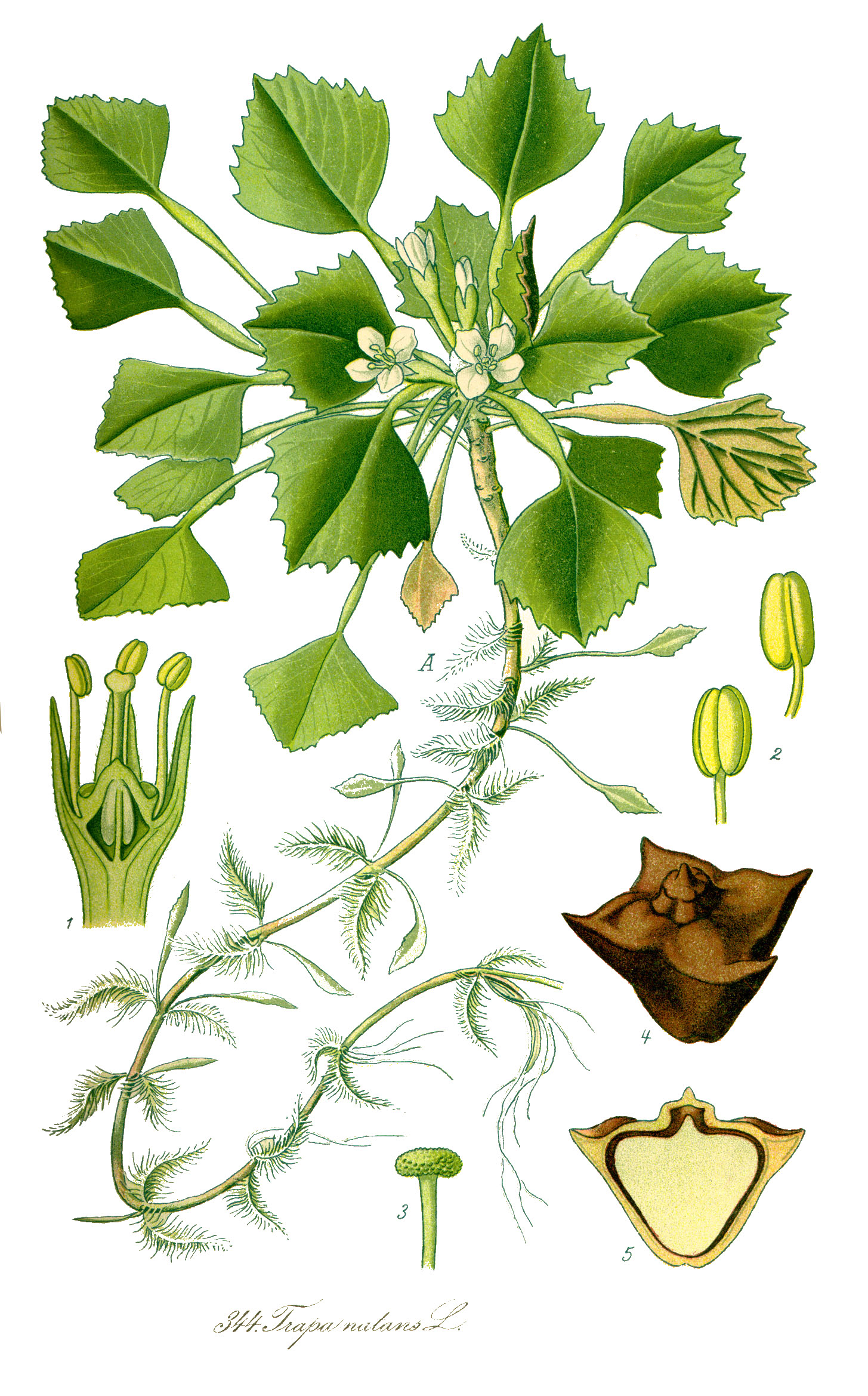
- Illustration of Trapa natans, Otto Wilhelm Thomé, 1885

Scientific classification
- Kingdom: Plantae
- Clade: Tracheophytes
- Clade: Angiosperms
- Clade: Eudicots
- Clade: Rosids
- Order: Myrtales
- Family: Lythraceae
- Genus: Trapa
- Species: T. natans

Binomial name
- Trapa natans L.

Synonyms
- see list

= Water caltrop =

Aquatic plant with edible fruit

Trapa natans, the water caltrop, is a widespread species of flowering plant in the genus Trapa, family Lythraceae, grown as a food crop. Other vernacular names include buffalo nut, bat nut, devil pod, ling nut, mustache nut, singhara nut, water nut, and water chestnut, though this last name is commonly applied to Eleocharis dulcis.

It is a floating annual aquatic plant, growing in slow-moving freshwater up to 5 metres (16 feet) deep, native to warm temperate parts of Eurasia and Africa. It bears horned fruits. Each fruit contains a single large seed. T. natans has been cultivated in China and the Indian subcontinent for the edible seeds for at least 3,000 years.

In feudal Japan, the fruits were used as substitutes for iron caltrops, an area denial weapon; they were sharp enough to penetrate the shoes of the period. The Japanese manufacturing group Mitsubishi takes its name and its logo from the plant. The Bengali name for the samosa or fried triangular pastry snack, shingara, is likewise the name of the plant.

== Description ==
Trapa natans forms floating leaf rosettes up to about 50 cm (20 in) across. It grows as an annual plant in shallow, slow-flowing fresh water, with a submerged stem up to some 2 m (7 ft) long and up to 6 mm (0.24 in) thick, rooted in the bottom mud and bearing thin leaves. The surface leaves are diamond-shaped, toothed, and up to 5 cm (2 in) long and 6 cm (2.5 in) wide. Their petioles (leaf stalks) are up to 21 cm (8.3 in) long.

The flowers have 4 white to pink petals up to 10 mm (0.4 in) long, 4 sepals, 4 stamens, and one pistil. There are initially 2 ovules in the ovary but only one develops. The flowers are mainly self-fertilising, occasionally insect-pollinated. The fruit is a nut (botanically a single-seeded drupe) with two to four barbed spines 12 mm (0.5 in) long that develop from the sepals. The plant contains an ellagitannin polyphenol called bicornin.

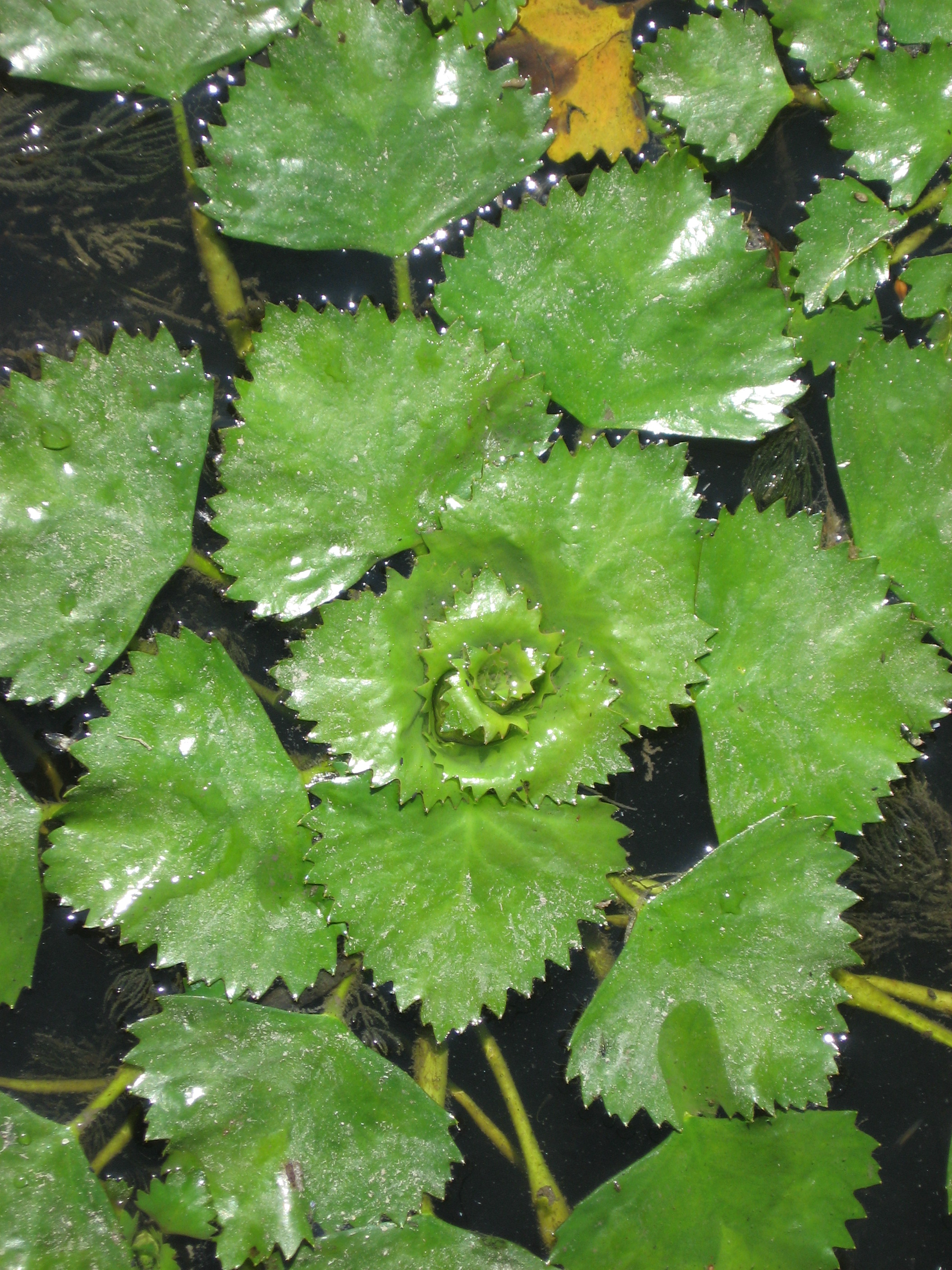
Floating leaves

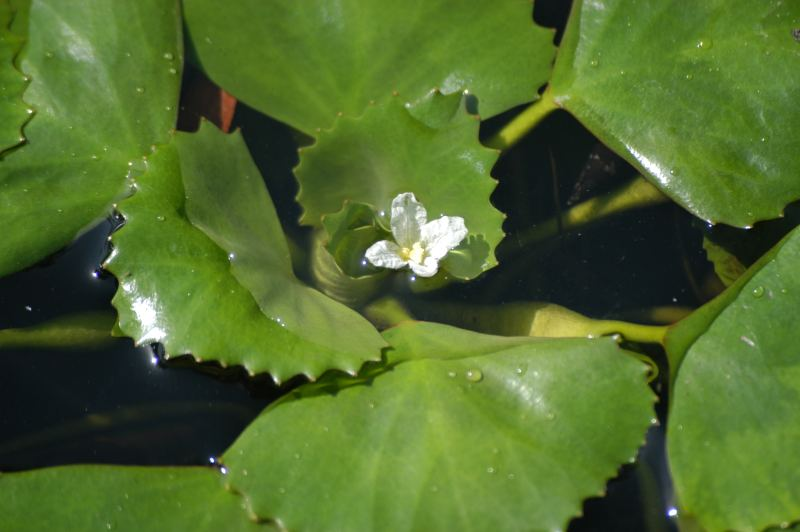
Flower

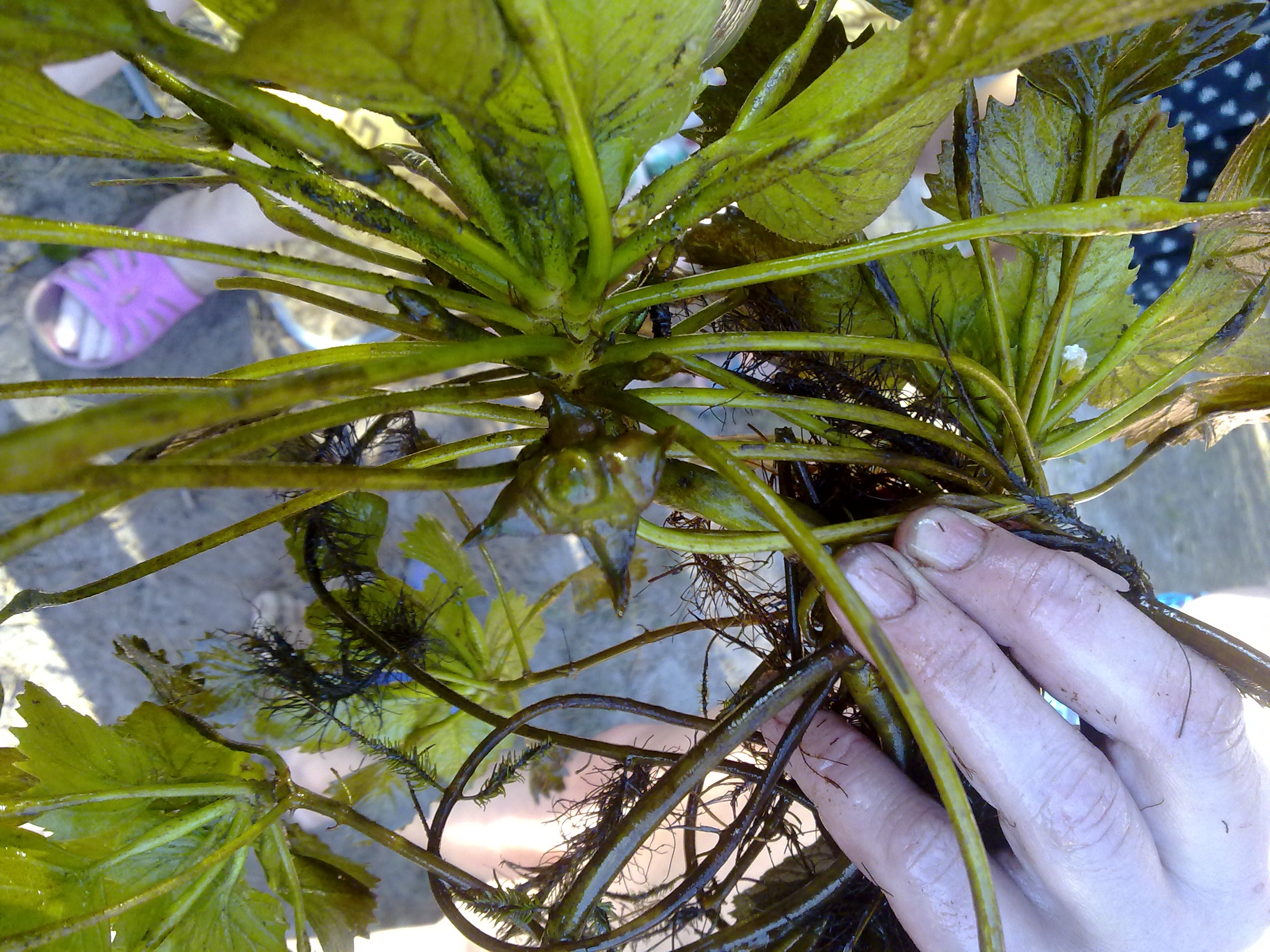
Plant showing floating petioles, submerged leaves and stem,
and a young fruit

== Evolution ==
=== Fossil record ===
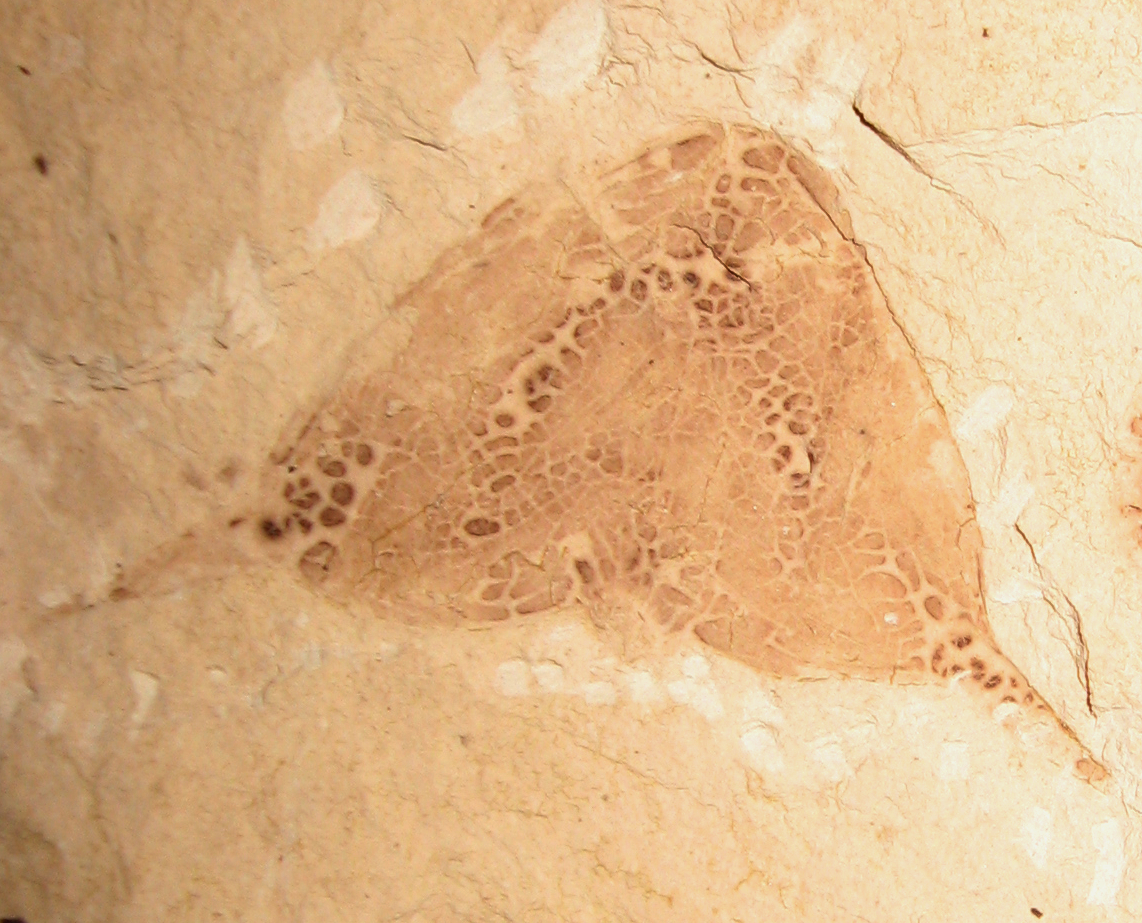
Trapa americana, Latah Formation, North America

The genus has an extensive fossil record, with numerous, distinctive species. Undisputed fossilized seeds have been found in Cenozoic strata starting from the Eocene throughout Europe, China and North America (though the genus became extinct in North America prior to the Pleistocene). The oldest known fossils attributed to the genus are of leaves from Cretaceous Alaska, referred to the species, T. borealis.

=== Taxonomy ===
Trapa natans is the type species of its genus, named by the Swedish botanist Carl Linnaeus in his Species Plantarum in 1753. The generic name Trapa is derived from a late Latin word for a caltrop, calcitrappa, an area denial weapon. The specific name natans is the Latin for swimming or floating, from the verb natare, "to swim". There are eight named varieties of T. natans. The Scottish surgeon and botanist William Roxburgh described Trapa bispinosa as a species in 1815, but botanists treat this as a variety of T. natans; "T. bicornis" was described by the Swedish botanist Pehr Osbeck as a species in 1757, but is treated as a synonym of T. natans var bispinosa. T. rossica was described by the Russian botanist Viktor Nikolayevich Vassiljev and published by Vladimir Leontyevich Komarov in 1949; it is treated as a synonym for T. natans var natans.

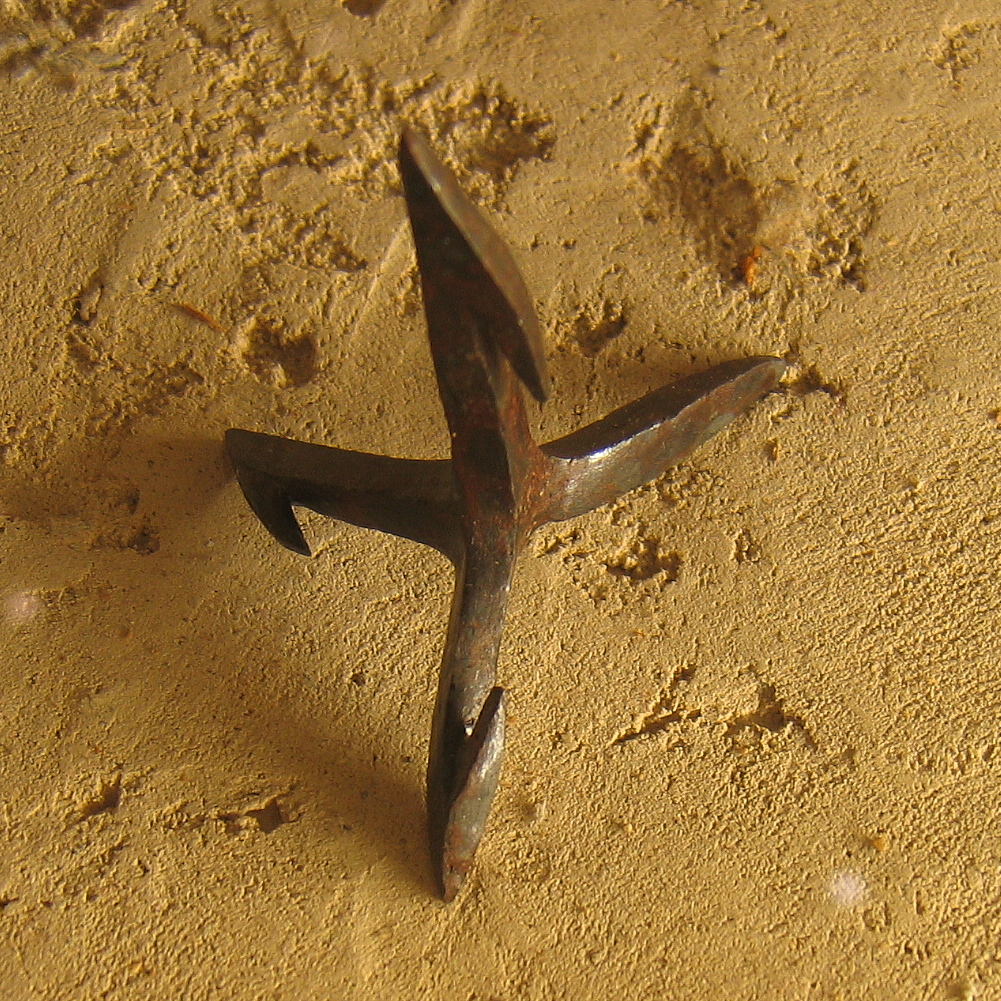
The generic name is derived from a Latin word for a caltrop.

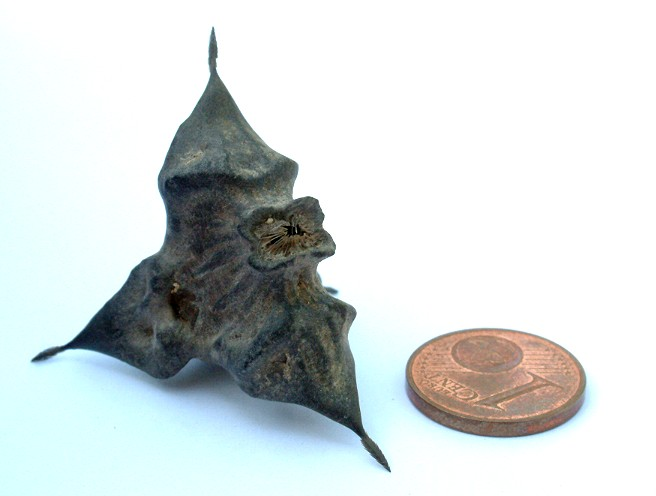
Trapa natans,
4-horned fruit

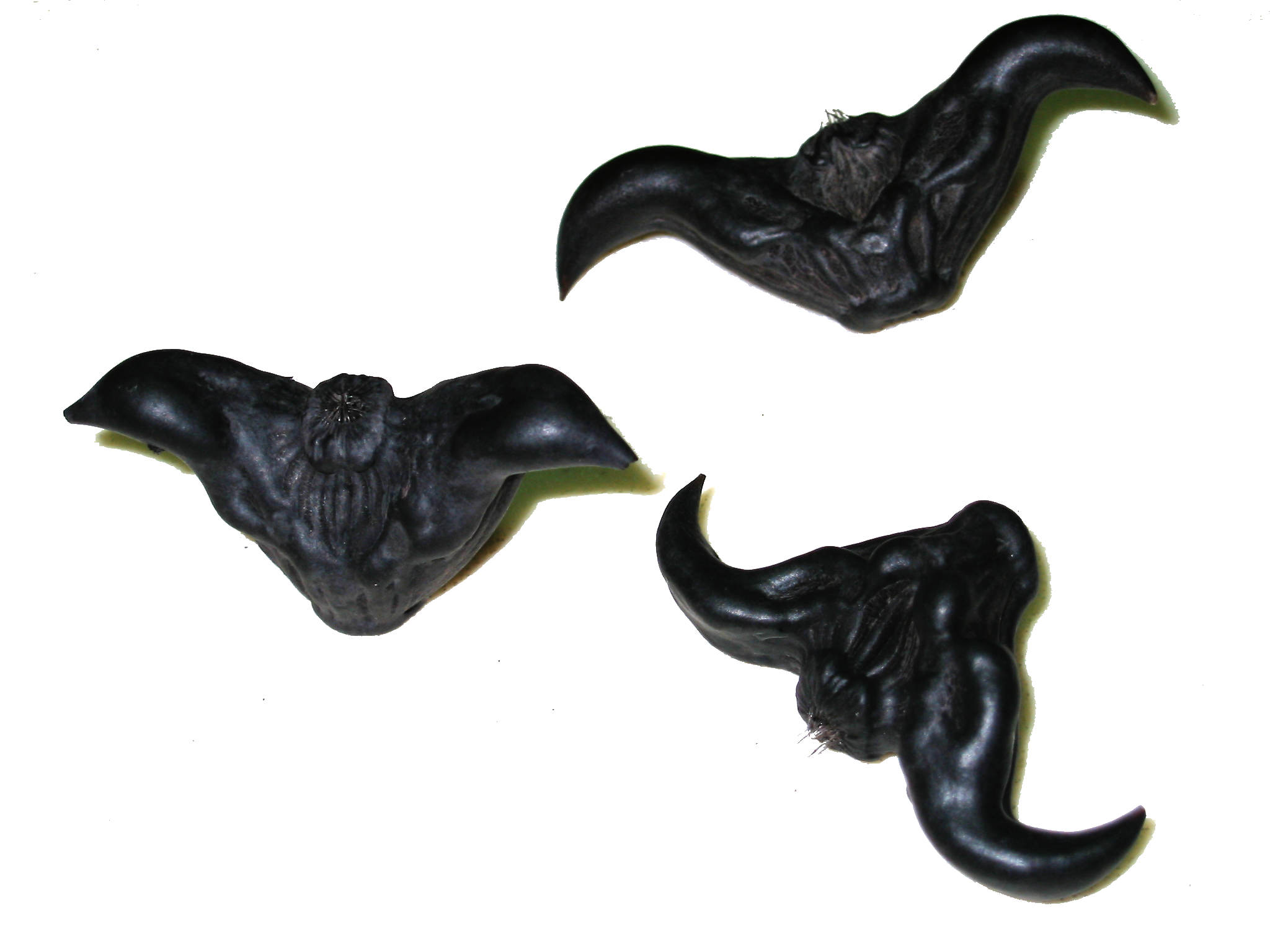
Trapa natans var bispinosa,
2-horned fruit

=== Subtaxa ===
The following varieties are accepted:

- Trapa natans var. africana Brenan – Tanzania, Uganda
- Trapa natans var. bispinosa (Roxb.) Makino – Tropical and southern Africa, Indian Subcontinent, eastern Asia
- Trapa natans var. japonica Nakai – Korea, Japan
- Trapa natans var. magnicorona (Z.T.Xiong) B.Y.Ding & X.F.Jin – Russian Far East, eastern China, Korea, Japan
- Trapa natans var. natans – North Africa, Eurasia, and introduced to eastern North America
- Trapa natans var. pseudincisa (Nakai) ined. – Russian Far East, eastern China, Korea, Japan
- Trapa natans var. quadricaudata (Glück) B.Y.Ding & X.F.Jin – Cameroon, KwaZulu-Natal, Southeast Asia, eastern China, Russian Far East, Japan
- Trapa natans var. quadrispinosa (Roxb.) Makino – Himalayas to Japan

== Distribution and habitat ==
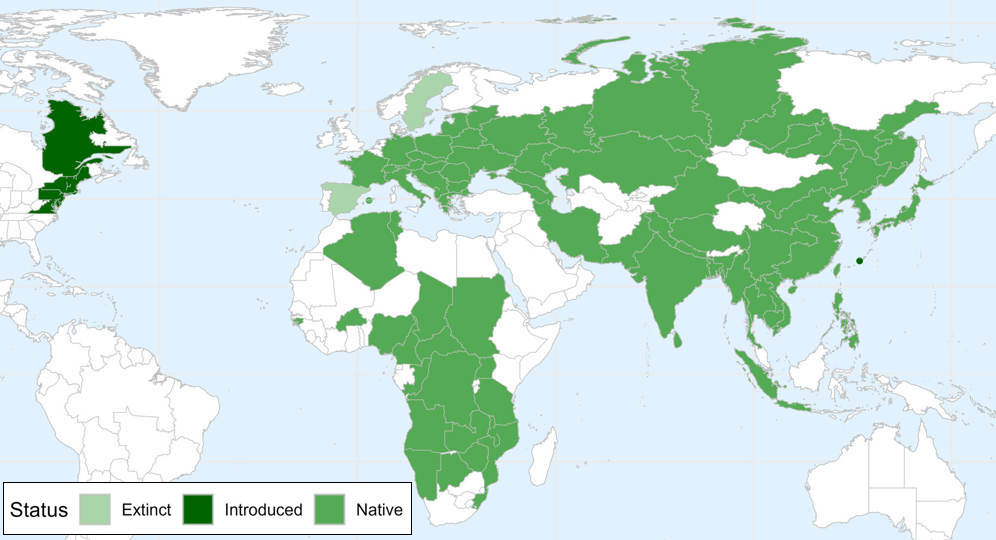
Trapa natans global distribution (Note: Whole political regions are highlighted if the species is present in them, potentially exaggerating the distribution.)

The habitat of Trapa natans is shallow, slow-flowing fresh water with bottom mud. The species prefers warm, nutrient-rich and sunny areas; the bottom is usually soft and rich in organic matter. It requires water temperatures to be above 22 °C (72 °F) for at least 2 months per year, and is expanding its range northwards due to climate change.

=== Native ===
Trapa natans is widely distributed across Eurasia and Africa, and its seeds disperse naturally via floating and by attaching to both birds and mammals. In Europe, it is extinct in Spain and Sweden, and is absent from Portugal, the British Isles, Norway, and Finland. It is so rare in Germany that it is listed as an endangered species. In 2024, it was predicted that the species, whose European distribution shrank between 1950 and 1980, will continue the expansion it began around 2000 until at least 2080, as global warming creates warmer conditions in the north of Europe. In Southeast Asia, it is present in Sumatra and Java; it is found, too, across the Philippines and Japan.

=== Introduced ===
In eastern North America, T. natans has been declared an invasive species from Vermont to Virginia, and is classified as a noxious weed in Florida, North Carolina, and Washington. As of 2020, both the natans and the bispinosa varieties were growing wild in US waterways. In 1956 T. natans was banned for sale or shipment in the US, subject to a fine and imprisonment. The law was repealed in 2020. T. natans was introduced to Massachusetts around 1874 as a planting in the Harvard University Botanic Garden, and from there intentionally spread into nearby ponds and waterways.

== Ecology ==
=== Competition ===
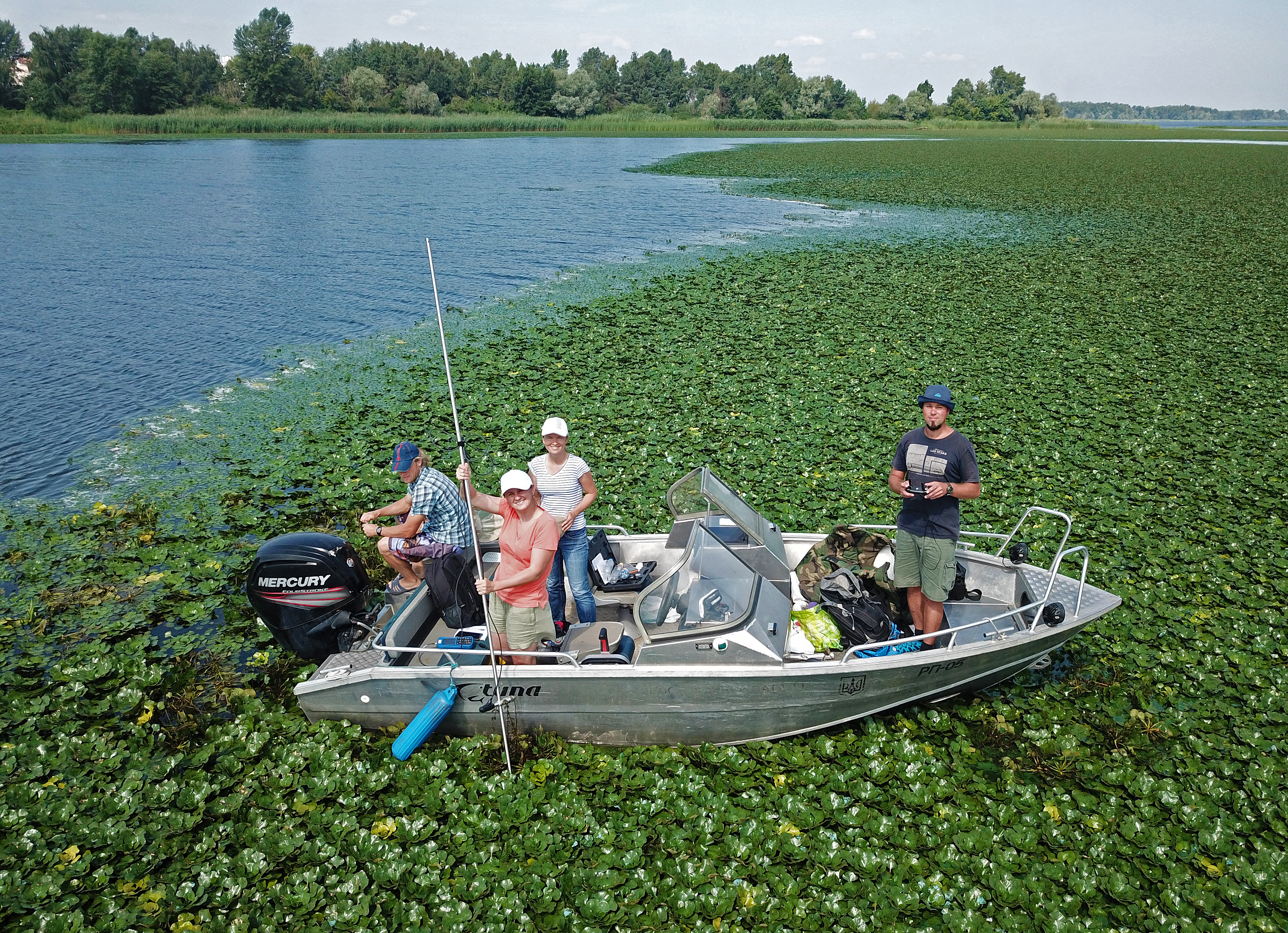
The plant can form a thick floating mat covering many hectares.

Trapa natans, being widespread, occurs alongside many other aquatic plants. In suitable conditions its rapid growth and ability to form a canopy over the water enable it to monopolise areas of water. Its ability to produce large numbers of seeds then enable it to maintain a dense coverage where it has established itself. The species can trap 95% of the sunlight falling on an area, depriving other plants of light for photosynthesis. Respiration by its submerged parts depletes oxygen in the water, which can cause methane to be produced, acidification of the water, and eutrophication. It modifies its own ecosystem by creating a thick surface canopy of dead leaves.

=== Pests and diseases ===
The species is grazed on by a species of chrysomelid leaf beetle, Galerucella birmanica in Asia; larvae and adults both eat the leaf blade. Curculionid weevils including Nanophyes japonica appear to be specialised feeders on the floating leaves including their petioles. The armyworm moth Spodoptera litura is a pest of T. natans cultivation. The crambid moth Elophila interruptalis eats and kills the central bud of the plant's shoot, killing it and stopping growth.

Among mammals, the beaver, coypu, muskrat and some squirrels eat the fruits and other parts of the plant. Among aquatic birds, swans have been recorded as eating the plant.

Ascomycete fungi such as Cercospora, Botrytis cinerea, and Cochliobolus spicifer occur with the plant, along with the basidiomycete pathogen Agroathelia rolfsii.

=== Parasite transmission ===
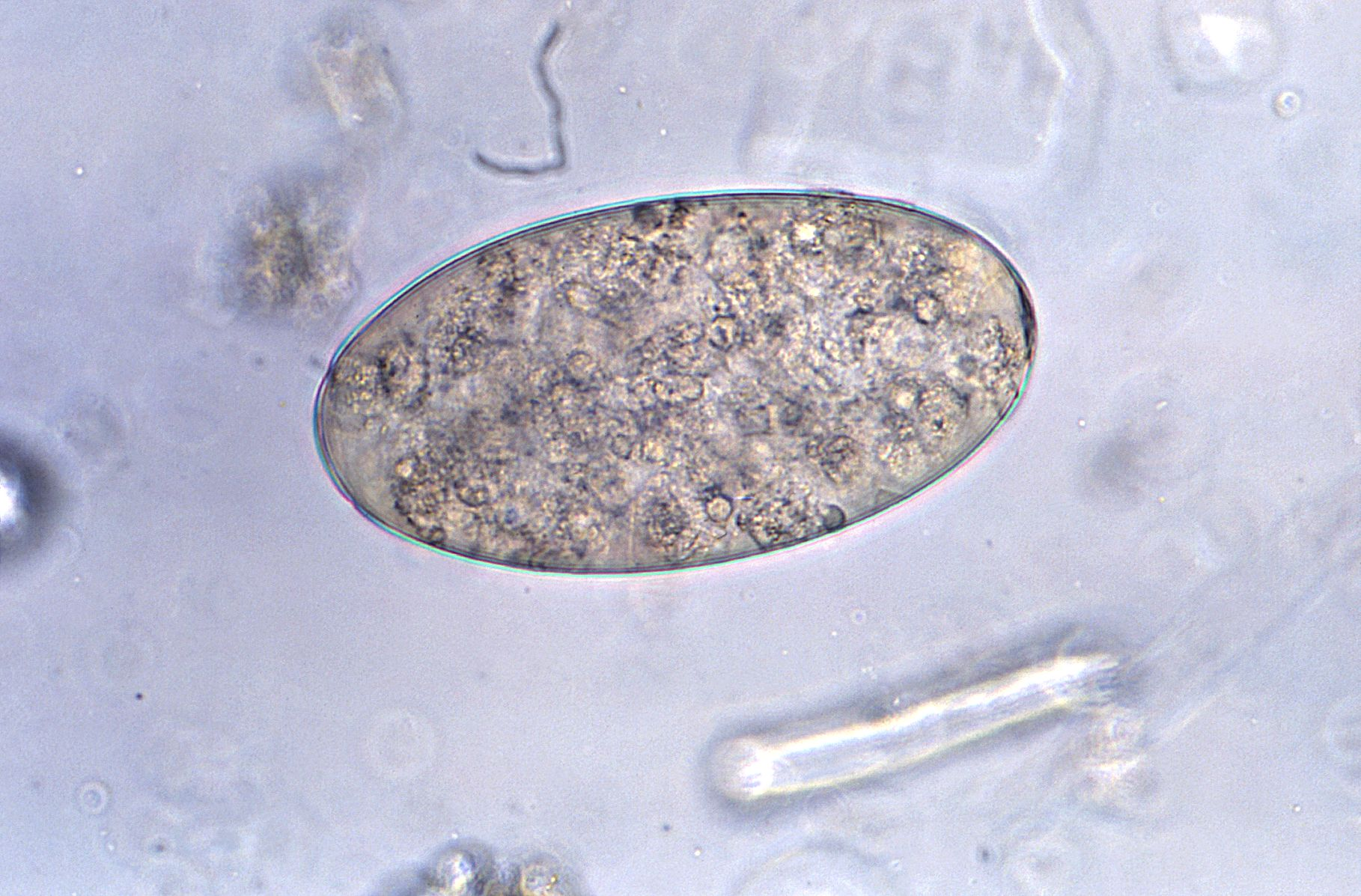
Eggs of the parasite Fasciolopsis buski, transmitted on the surface of T. natans fruits

Fasciolopsiasis is a disease caused by the trematode Fasciolopsis buski, an intestinal fluke of humans and pigs, endemic in China, Southeast Asia, and India. It can be transmitted via the surfaces of water plants, generally T. natans fruits. The larval flukes leave their freshwater snail hosts, and form cysts on the plants. If these are eaten raw or undercooked, the flukes can infect their mammalian hosts.

== Interactions with humans ==
=== Use as food ===
The fruits and seeds are edible raw or cooked. Archaeological finds from southern Germany indicate that the prehistoric population of that region may have relied significantly upon wild water caltrops to supplement their normal diet and, in times of cultivated cereal crop failure, water caltrops may have been the main dietary component.

Water caltrop has been an important food for prayer offerings since the Chinese Zhou dynasty. The Rites of Zhou (second century BC) required worshippers to carry bamboo baskets of dried water caltrops (加籩之實，菱芡栗脯).

In India and Pakistan, it is known as singhara or paniphal (eastern India) and is widely cultivated in freshwater lakes. The fruits are eaten raw or boiled. When the fruit has been dried, it is ground to a flour called singhare ka atta, used in many religious rituals, and can be consumed as a phalahar (fruit diet) on the Hindu fasting days, the navratas.

It was possible to buy water caltrops in markets all over Europe until 1880. In northern Italy, the nuts were offered roasted, much as sweet chestnuts (Castanea sativa) are still sold today. In many parts of Europe, water caltrops were known and used for human food until the beginning of the 20th century. The plant has however become rare in Europe. Several reasons for its near extirpation exist, such as climate fluctuations, changes in the nutrient content of water bodies, and the drainage of many wetlands, ponds, and oxbow lakes.

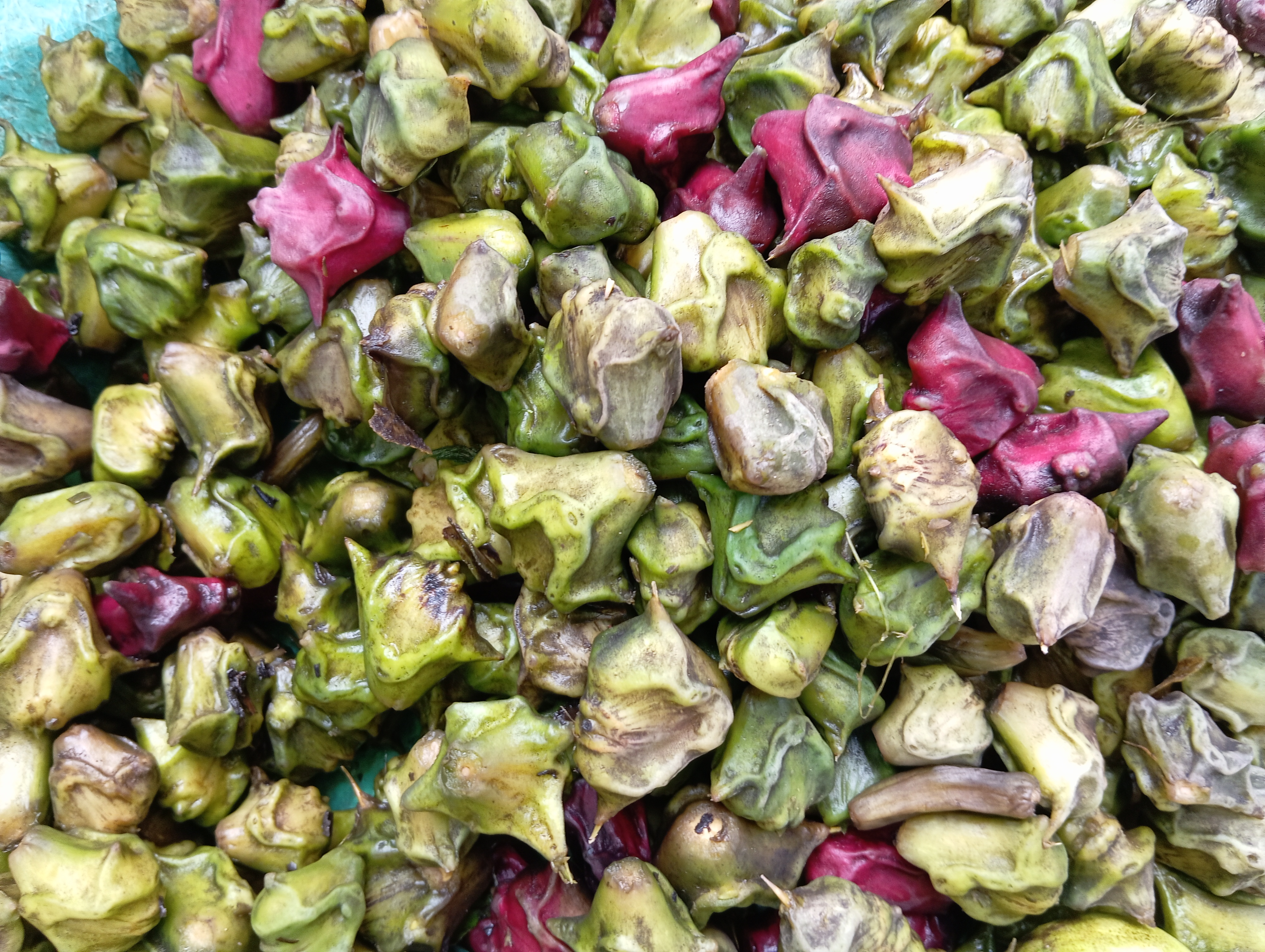
Harvested fruits

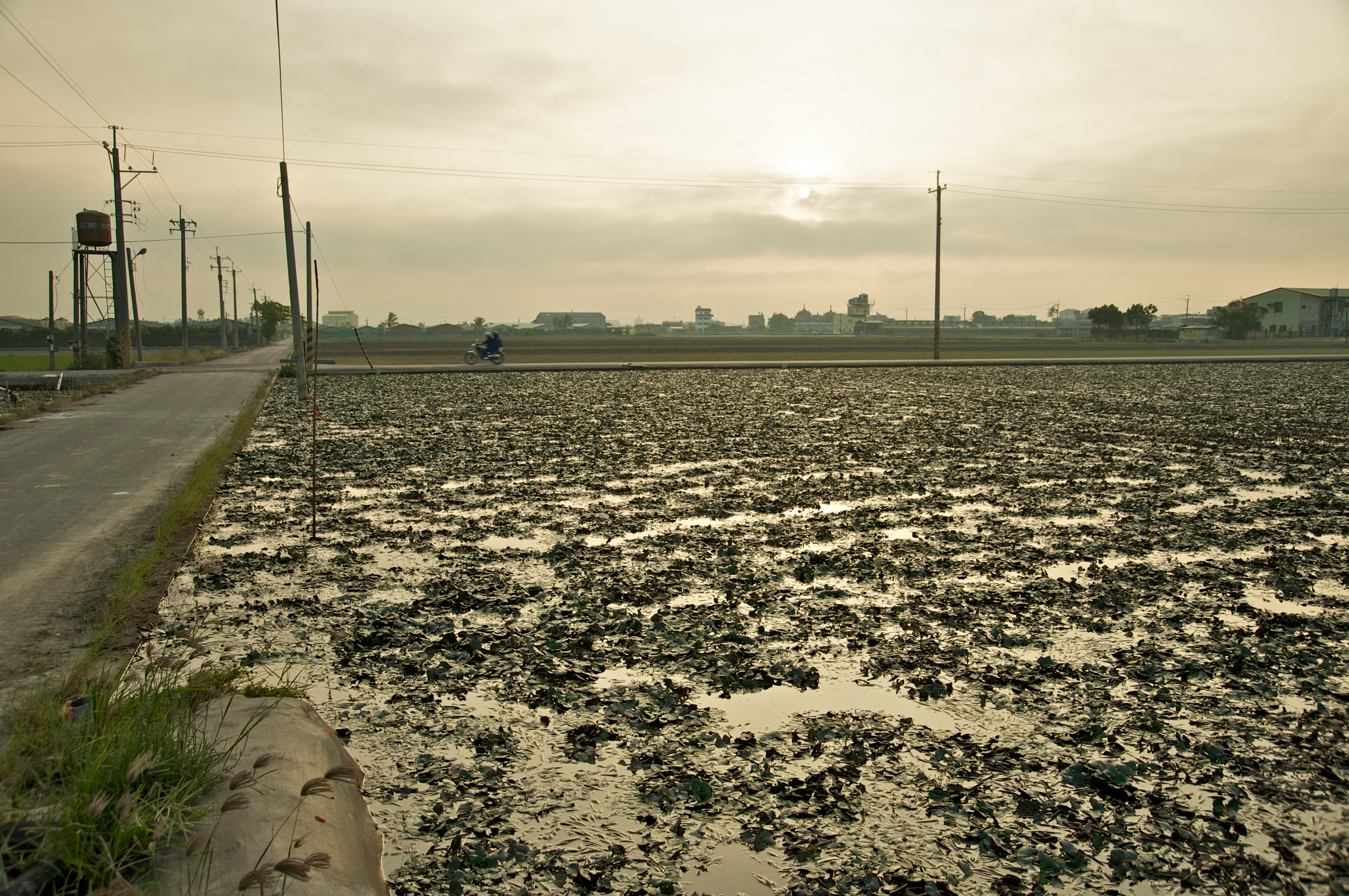
Water caltrop field, Taiwan

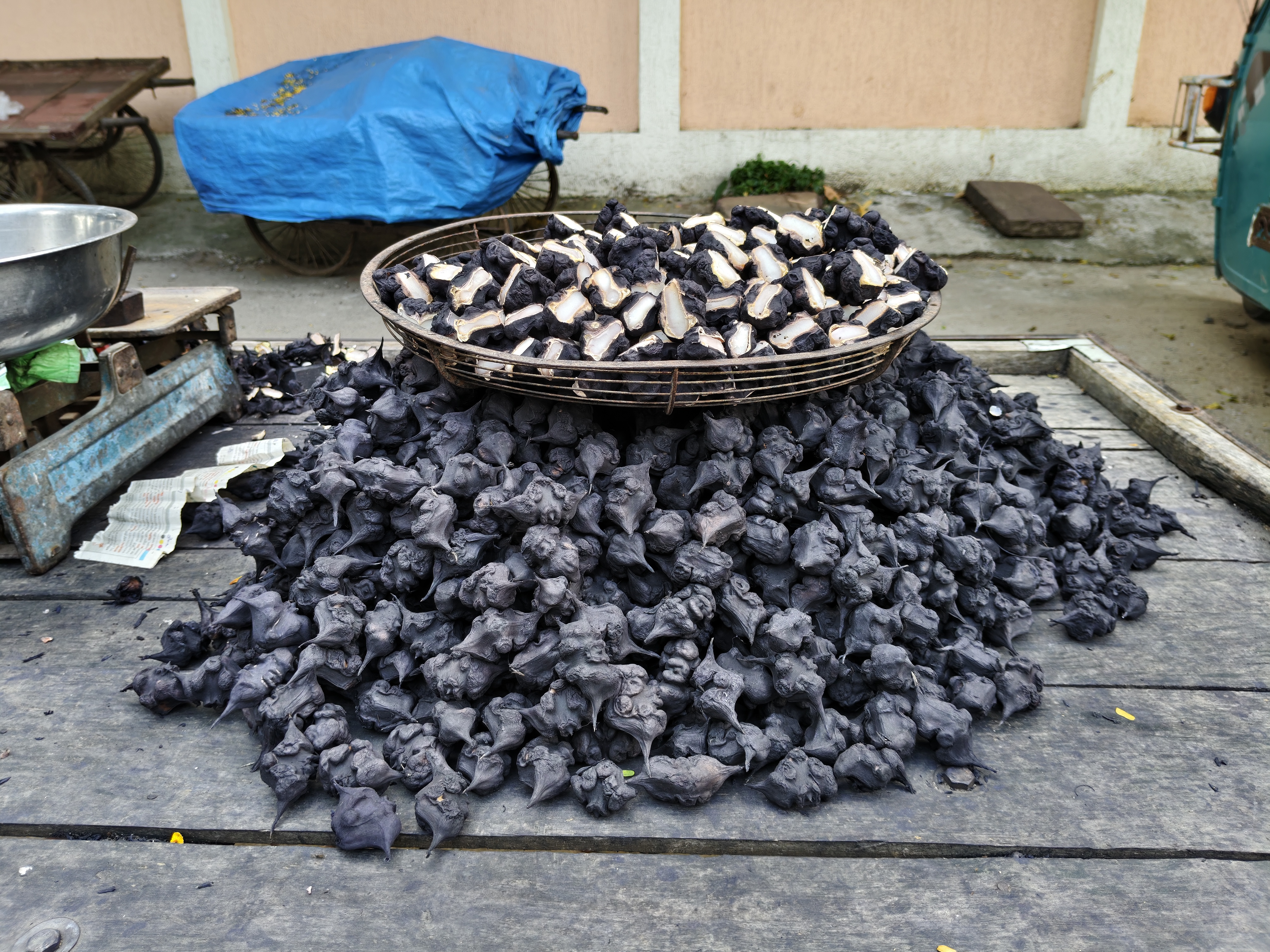
Boiled singhara (Trapa natans) for sale, Bhopal, India

=== In culture ===
In feudal Japan, water caltrop fruits were sometimes used as substitutes, tennenbishi for iron caltrops, makibishi. Both types were sharp enough to penetrate the soles of the waraji sandals worn by warriors of the period. The manufacturing group Mitsubishi takes its name, which means "three rhombuses" or "three water caltrops" (Japanese 三 mitsu, "three", 菱 hishi "water caltrop"), and its logo from the plant. In Eastern India and Bangladesh, the samosa (a fried triangular pastry) is called सिंघाड़ा shingara after the fruit.

The company name Mitsubishi and its logo denote the fruit.

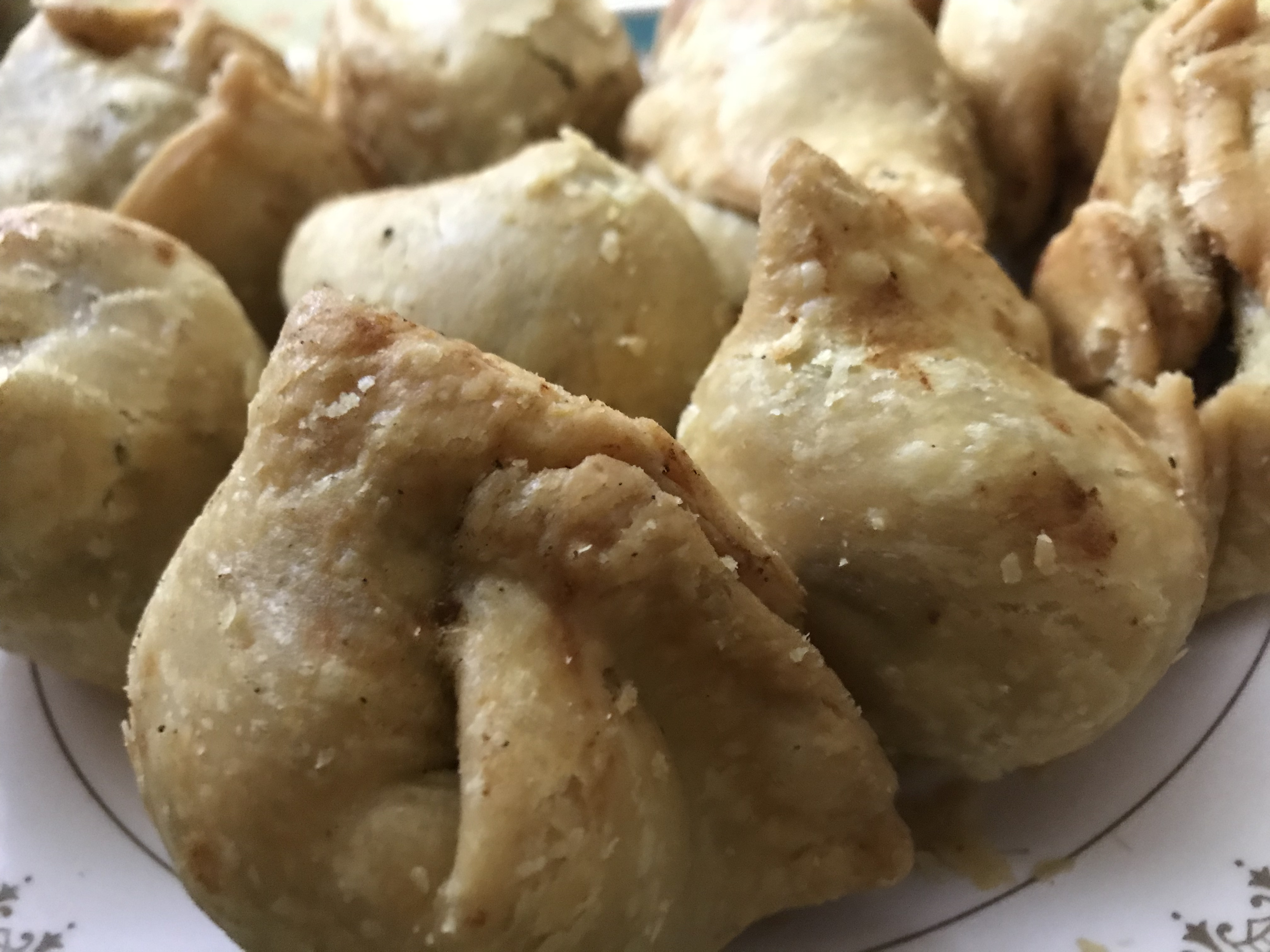
Shingara, meaning water caltrop, is the Bengali name for samosas, fried triangular pastry snacks.
