= Birzhevyie Vedomosti (1880–1917) =

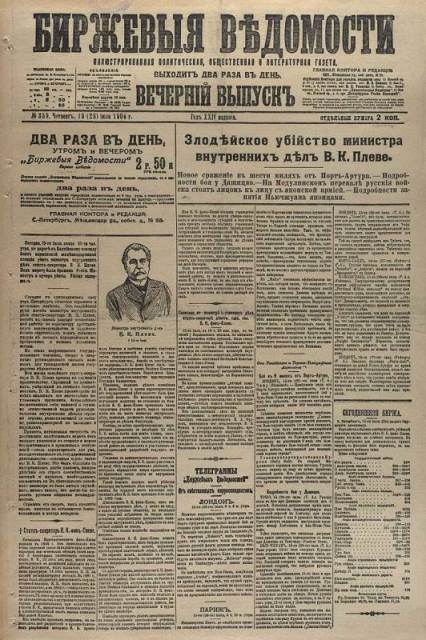
- 15 July 1904 edition reporting on the assassination of Vyacheslav von Plehve
- Type: Daily newspaper
- Owner: Stanislav Propper
- Founded: 1880
- Ceased publication: 1917
- Political alignment: center left
- Headquarters: Saint Petersburg, Russian Empire

Birzhevyie Vedomosti (Russian: Биржевы́е ве́домости/Биржевыя Вѣдомости, lit. 'Stock Exchange News') was a Russian newspaper established in 1880 in St. Petersburg. It was a merger of two pre-existent publications, Birzhevy Vestnik and Russkiy Mir, founded by Stanislav Propper, then an Austrian citizen, who allegedly bought the rights at an auction for 13 rubles he had borrowed from friends. Often referred to as Birzhevye Vedomosti's "Second edition", it became a daily in 1885. It was edited first by Propper, and later by Vladimir Bondi and Ieronim Yasinsky. A centrist, mildly liberal publication, it lasted until 1917 and was shut down by the city's Bolshevik authorities, answering the allegation of being engaged in "anti-Soviet propaganda".
