= Vissarion Komarov =

Russian journalist, editor and colonel

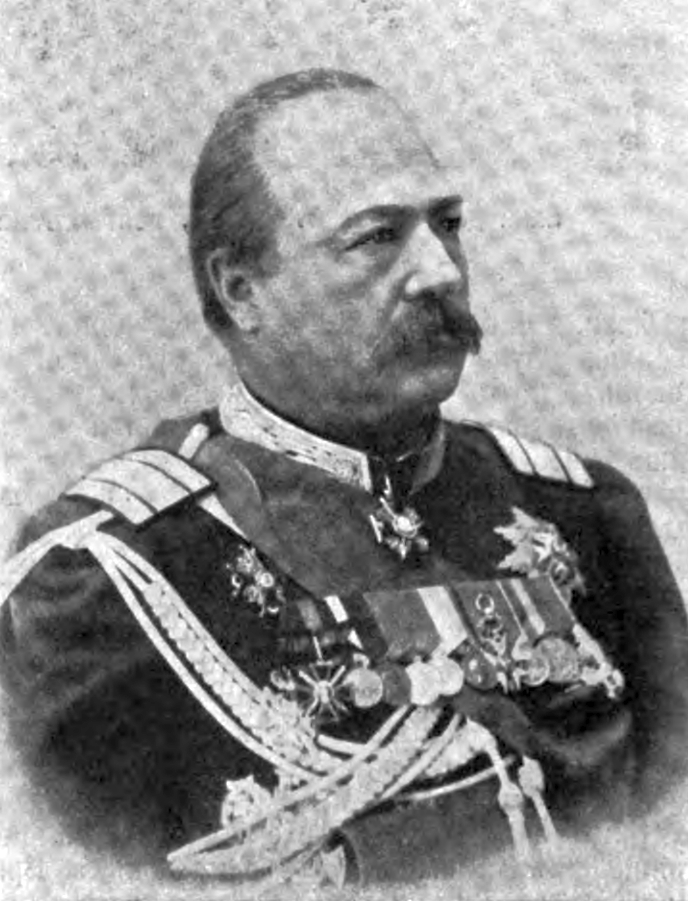
- Born: Vissarion Vissarionovich Komarov; Виссарион Виссарионович Комаров; 26 October 1838; Vitebsk Governorate, Russian Empire
- Died: 4 January 1908 (aged 69); Saint Petersburg, Russian Empire
- Occupations: journalist, publicist, editor

Vissarion Vissarionovich Komarov (Russian: Виссарио́н Виссарио́нович Комаро́в, 26 October 1838—4 January 1908) was a Russian journalist, editor and an Imperial Russian Army colonel who in 1876 was promoted to the rank of the Serbian army general for his victories in several battles he conducted against the Turkish army during the Montenegrin–Ottoman War, in 1876.

A Second Cadet Corps (1857) and Nicholas General Staff Academy (1861) alumnus, Komarov started his military career in St Petersburg. There he started to contribute essays to Russky Invalid, Voyenny Sbornik (Military Collection) and Moskovskiye Vedomosti, then hit the spotlight in 1871 when, alongside General Mikhail Chernyayev and Major General Rostislav Fadeyev, he co-founded the newspaper Russkiy Mir in Saint Petersburg (to become also its publisher) and in his essays started to criticize the sweeping military reforms conducted by Count Dmitry Milyutin. In 1877-1883 Komarov edited Sankt-Peterburgskie Vedomosti. In 1882 he founded his own newspaper Svet (Light) which he remained with until his death, and was extremely proud of. Among the authors whose work appeared there regularly, was historical novelist Grigory Danilevsky, whose daughter Komarov had married. He also published Zvezda magazine (in 1886—1891), Slavyanskiye Izvestiya (1889—1891) and in 1902—1906 Russky Vestnik.

A staunch Slavophile and monarchist, Komarov was one of the leaders of the Slavic Charitable Society (where he met Dostoyevsky). In 1901 he became a co-founder of Russkoye Sobraniye, a loyalist right-wing monarchist political group. His nephew and godson was Vladimir L. Komarov.
