= Taxonomic synonyms of Trapa natans =

Classification of water caltrop

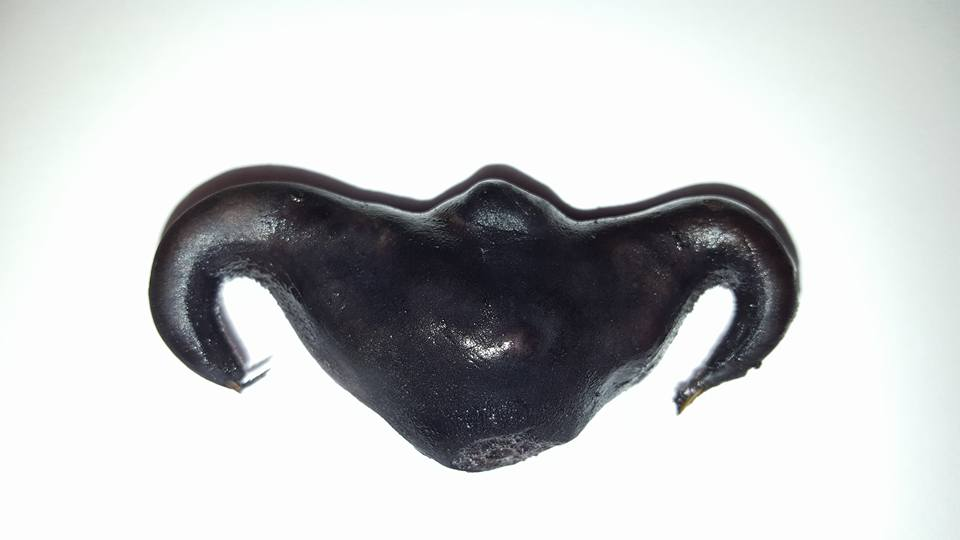
Fruit of Trapa natans var bispinosa

Trapa natans, the water caltrop, is a widespread species and has a large number of accepted subtaxa, all varieties. These varieties have at least 185 taxonomic synonyms, as listed in the Royal Botanic Gardens, Kew taxonomic database Plants of the World Online.

== Trapa natans var. bispinosa ==
=== Homotypic synonyms ===
- Trapa bicornis var. bispinosa (Roxb.) Nakano
- Trapa bispinosa Roxb.

=== Heterotypic synonyms ===
- Trapa arcuata S.H.Li & Y.L.Chang
- Trapa austroafricana V.N.Vassil.
- Trapa bicornis Osbeck
- Trapa bicornis var. cochinchinensis (Lour.) Steenis
- Trapa bicornis var. makinosa (Nakano) Nakano
- Trapa bicornis var. taiwanensis (Nakai) Z.T.Xiong
- Trapa bispinosa var. cochinchinensis Nakai
- Trapa bispinosa var. iwasakii Nakano
- Trapa bispinosa var. makinoa Nakano
- Trapa chinensis Flerow
- Trapa chinensis Lour.
- Trapa chinensis var. flerovii Skvortsov
- Trapa chinensis var. manshurica Skvortsov
- Trapa cochinchinensis Lour.
- Trapa congolensis V.N.Vassil.
- Trapa dimorphocarpa Z.S.Diao
- Trapa insperata V.N.Vassil.
- Trapa japonica Flerow
- Trapa japonica var. jeholensis (Nakai) Kitag.
- Trapa japonica var. macrocarpa Flerow
- Trapa japonica var. oblonga Flerow
- Trapa jeholensis Nakai
- Trapa manshurica var. bispinosa Flerow
- Trapa natans var. bicornis (Osbeck) Makino
- Trapa taiwanensis Nakai

== Trapa natans var. magnicorona ==
=== Homotypic synonyms ===
- Trapa japonica var. magnicorona Z.T.Xiong

=== Heterotypic synonyms ===
- Trapa japonica var. longicollum Z.T.Xiong
- Trapa japonica var. tuberculifera (V.N.Vassil.) Tzvelev
- Trapa korshinskyi V.N.Vassil.
- Trapa litwinowii V.N.Vassil.
- Trapa litwinowii var. chihuensis S.F.Guan & Q.Lang
- Trapa tuberculifera V.N.Vassil.

== Trapa natans var. natans ==
=== Heterotypic synonyms ===
- Trapa acicularis V.N.Vassil.
- Trapa alatyrica Sprygin ex V.N.Vassil.
- Trapa algeriensis V.N.Vassil.
- Trapa amurensis Flerow
- Trapa amurensis var. bispinosa Flerow
- Trapa annosa Janković
- Trapa annosa f. bicornis Janković
- Trapa annosa f. erecticornis Janković
- Trapa annosa f. pseudomuzzanensis Janković
- Trapa araborum V.N.Vassil.
- Trapa astrachanica (Flerow) N.A.Winter
- Trapa astrachanica var. caspica (V.N.Vassil.) Tzvelev
- Trapa bicornis var. iwasakii Nakano
- Trapa bicornis var. jinumae (Nakano) Nakano
- Trapa bispinosa var. jinumae Nakano
- Trapa borysthenica V.N.Vassil.
- Trapa brevicarpa Janković
- Trapa brevicarpa subsp. calosa Janković
- Trapa brevicarpa var. delicata Janković
- Trapa brevicarpa f. effigia Janković
- Trapa brevicarpa f. miniata Janković
- Trapa brevicarpa var. mirabila Janković
- Trapa brevicarpa f. muzzanensoides Janković
- Trapa brevicarpa f. perexcelsa Janković
- Trapa brevicarpa f. quadrata Janković
- Trapa brevicarpa subsp. rubida Janković
- Trapa carinthiaca (Beck) V.N.Vassil.
- Trapa caspica V.N.Vassil.
- Trapa castanea Gilib.
- Trapa caucasica Flerow
- Trapa caucasica var. colchica (Albov) Flerow
- Trapa caucasica f. microcarpa Flerow
- Trapa caucasica var. tanaitica Flerow
- Trapa colchica Albov
- Trapa conocarpa (F.Aresch.) Flerow
- Trapa conocarpa var. pyramidalis (V.N.Vassil.) Tzvelev
- Trapa conocarpa var. suecica (Nath.) Tzvelev
- Trapa cruciata (Glück) V.N.Vassil.
- Trapa danubialis Dobrocz.
- Trapa europaea Flerow
- Trapa europaea var. clipeata Janković
- Trapa europaea var. egregia Janković
- Trapa europaea var. macrocarpa Janković
- Trapa europaea var. vulgata Janković
- Trapa fastigiata P.Vassil.
- Trapa flerovii Dobrocz.
- Trapa grozdovii V.N.Vassil. ex V.N.Tikhom.
- Trapa hungarica Opiz ex Nyman
- Trapa jankovicii Tacik
- Trapa kasachstanica V.N.Vassil.
- Trapa kazakorum P.Vassil.
- Trapa komarovii var. tetracorna A.I.Baranov & Skvortzov
- Trapa krauselii P.Vassil.
- Trapa laevis C.Presl ex Nyman
- Trapa longicarpa Janković
- Trapa longicarpa f. alticarpa Janković
- Trapa longicarpa f. amplicornis Janković
- Trapa longicarpa f. arcuata Janković
- Trapa longicarpa f. bicornis Janković
- Trapa longicarpa f. brevicola Janković
- Trapa longicarpa f. columnifera Janković
- Trapa longicarpa f. concamerata Janković
- Trapa longicarpa var. contortula Janković
- Trapa longicarpa f. coronatoides Janković
- Trapa longicarpa f. depressa Janković
- Trapa longicarpa f. elata Janković
- Trapa longicarpa f. elongata Janković
- Trapa longicarpa f. falcata Janković
- Trapa longicarpa var. loricata Janković
- Trapa longicarpa var. mammeata Janković
- Trapa longicarpa subvar. miniata Janković
- Trapa longicarpa f. perangusticornis Janković
- Trapa longicarpa subsp. perlongicornis Janković
- Trapa longicarpa f. producticarpa Janković
- Trapa longicarpa f. pseudomuzzanensis Janković
- Trapa longicarpa var. rubra Janković
- Trapa longicarpa var. spatiosa Janković
- Trapa longicarpa f. subcoronata Janković
- Trapa longicarpa f. tesselata Janković
- Trapa longicarpa f. turgida Janković
- Trapa longicarpa subsp. valida Janković
- Trapa longicornis V.N.Vassil.
- Trapa macrorhiza Dobrocz.
- Trapa maeotica Woronow
- Trapa maleevii V.N.Vassil.
- Trapa manshurica Flerow
- Trapa manshurica var. rubra Pshenn. & Kozhevnikova
- Trapa manshurica var. tranzschelii (V.N.Vassil.) Kitag.
- Trapa media (Glück) V.N.Vassil.
- Trapa metschorica P.Vassil.
- Trapa muzzanensis Jäggi
- Trapa natans var. amurensis (Flerow) Kom.
- Trapa natans var. bohemica Flerow
- Trapa natans var. borysthenica (V.N.Vassil.) Tzvelev
- Trapa natans var. carinthiaca Beck
- Trapa natans var. conocarpa F.Aresch.
- Trapa natans var. europaea (Flerow) Tzvelev
- Trapa natans var. glaberrima Wahlenb.
- Trapa natans var. hamata Tzvelev
- Trapa natans var. rubeola Makino
- Trapa natans f. suecica Nath.
- Trapa natans var. surajensis Flerow
- Trapa natans var. suroshensis Flerow
- Trapa natans var. verbanensis (De Not.) Flerow
- Trapa numidica V.N.Vassil.
- Trapa okensis P.Vassil.
- Trapa pectinata V.N.Vassil.
- Trapa potaninii V.N.Vassil.
- Trapa pseudincisa var. potaninii (V.N.Vassil.) Tzvelev
- Trapa pseudocolchica V.N.Vassil.
- Trapa pseudorossica V.N.Vassil.
- Trapa pyramidalis V.N.Vassil.
- Trapa quadricornis Stokes
- Trapa raciborskii Jent.-Szaf. ex Tacik
- Trapa rossica V.N.Vassil.
- Trapa rossica var. pseudorossica (V.N.Vassil.) Tzvelev
- Trapa saissanica (Flerow) V.N.Vassil.
- Trapa sajanensis P.Vassil.
- Trapa septentrionalis V.N.Vassil.
- Trapa sibirica Flerow
- Trapa sibirica var. altaica Flerow
- Trapa sibirica var. saisanica Flerow
- Trapa spryginii V.N.Vassil.
- Trapa tanaitica (Flerow) Flerow
- Trapa tranzschelii V.N.Vassil.
- Trapa turbinata P.Vassil.
- Trapa ucrainica P.Vassil.
- Trapa uralensis P.Vassil.
- Trapa verbanensis De Not.
- Trapa wolgensis V.N.Vassil.
- Tribulus aquaticus Garsault

== Trapa natans var. pseudincisa ==
=== Homotypic synonyms ===
- Trapa pseudincisa Nakai

=== Heterotypic synonyms ===
- Trapa komarovii V.N.Vassil.
- Trapa natans var. complana (Z.T.Xiong) B.Y.Ding & X.F.Jin
- Trapa pseudincisa var. aspinta Z.T.Xiong
- Trapa pseudincisa var. complana Z.T.Xiong
- Trapa pseudincisa var. nanchangensis W.H.Wan

== Trapa natans var. quadricaudata ==
=== Homotypic synonyms ===
- Trapa incisa var. quadricaudata Glück

=== Heterotypic synonyms ===
- Trapa maximowiczii Korsh.
- Trapa maximowiczii var. brevispina Flerow
- Trapa maximowiczii var. tenuis Flerow
- Trapa natans var. pumila Nakano ex Verdc.

== Trapa natans var. quadrispinosa ==
=== Homotypic synonyms ===
- Trapa bicornis var. quadrispinosa (Roxb.) Z.T.Xiong
- Trapa natans f. quadrispinosa (Roxb.) Makino
- Trapa quadrispinosa Roxb.

=== Heterotypic synonyms ===
- Trapa acornis Nakano
- Trapa amurensis var. komarovii Skvortsov
- Trapa bicornis var. acornis (Nakano) Z.T.Xiong
- Trapa manshurica f. komarovii (Skvortsov) S.H.Li & Y.L.Chang
- Trapa natans var. komarovii (Skvortsov) B.Y.Ding & X.F.Jin
- Trapa quadrispinosa var. yongxiuensis W.H.Wan
