= Dmitry Stakheyev =

Russian writer, poet and journalist

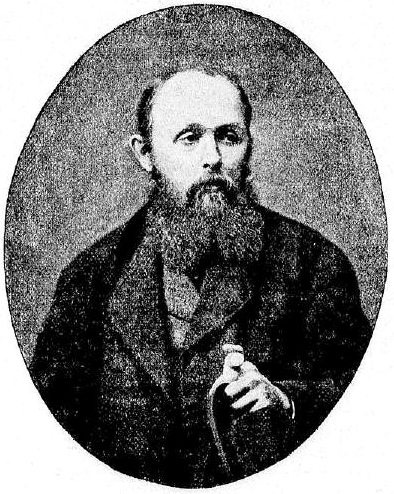
- Born: Dmitry Ivanovich Stakheyev; Дмитрий Иванович Стахеев; 14 February 1840; Elabuga, Vyatka Governorate, Russian Empire
- Died: 1918 (aged 77–78); Alushta, Crimea
- Occupations: writer, journalist, editor

Dmitry Ivanovich Stakheyev (Russian: Дмитрий Иванович Стахеев; 14 February 1840, – 1918) was a Russian writer, poet and journalist.

== Biography ==
Born in Elabuga into an affluent merchant family, Stakheyev started his literary career (of which his father greatly disapproved; this led to severing all ties between them) in 1860s in Saint Petersburg, as a regular contributor of stories, sketches and poems to the magazines Iskra, Delo and Budilnik. In the course of two decades he grew into a popular fiction writer, whose best-known works included the novels Na Zakate (На закате, At Sunset, 1880), Studenty (Студенты, 1884), Domashny Ochag (Домашний Очаг, Home Hearth, 1879), Obnovlyuonny Khram (Обновлённый храм, The Revived Church, 1892), Neugasayushchi Svet (Неугасающий свет, The Undying Light, 1893), Gory Zolota (Горы золота, Heaps of Gold, 1894) and Dukha Ne Ugashayte (Духа не угашайте, Do Not Let Your Spirit Die Out, 1896). The critic Nikolai Strakhov, reviewing (positively) Stakheyev's early novella Nasledniki (Наследники, The Inheritors, 1975), lauded the liveliness of his prose and proclaimed him to be heir to Nikolai Gogol.

Stakheyev travelled a lot through Western Europe and published numerous tourist sketches. He edited the magazines Niva (1875—1877), Russkiy Mir (1876—1877) and Russky Vestnik in 1896. He spent the last two decades of his life in Crimea, where he died, in Alushta, in 1918.
