= Komaroviopsis =

Scientific classification
- Kingdom: Plantae
- Clade: Tracheophytes
- Clade: Angiosperms
- Clade: Eudicots
- Clade: Asterids
- Order: Apiales
- Family: Apiaceae
- Subfamily: Apioideae
- Tribe: Komarovieae
- Genus: Komaroviopsis; Doweld
- Species: K. anisoptera

Binomial name
- Komaroviopsis anisoptera (Korovin) Doweld

Genus of plants

Komaroviopsis is a monotypic genus of flowering plants belonging to the family Apiaceae. It contains only one species, Komaroviopsis anisoptera, native to Uzbekistan in Central Asia.

== Taxonomy ==
The genus was first described in 1939, along with the sole species. The name Komarovia was in honour of Vladimir Leontyevich Komarov (1869–1945), a Russian botanist. However, the genus name Komaroffia, a variant spelling of Komarov's name when made into Latin, had already been published in 1887, so "Komarovia" is an illegitimate name. The replacement name Komaroviopsis was published in 2021.

The Latin specific epithet of anisoptera is made up of two words; aniso meaning unequal or uneven, and ptera from Greek pterux word meaning wing.
