= Stanley Babin =

American composer and pianist (1932–2010)

Stanley Babin (1932–2010) was a composer and pianist.

== Life ==
Babin was born in 1932 to Lydia and David Babin, a rabbi. He had four siblings. The family emigrated to Tel Aviv in 1933, where he studied music with Frank Pelleg and made his official debut at Museum Hall in 1945. The young prodigy became his family's chief breadwinner and Jerusalem and Tel Aviv acclaimed him with the post-war enthusiasm of the newborn nation.

Two years later, Babin came to New York City to become the youngest pupil of Artur Schnabel. From 1949 to 1953, he continued his studies in Philadelphia's all-scholarship Curtis Institute under the direction of Isabella Vengerova.

He began a major career under the management of Arthur Judson. After winning the first Concert Artists' Guild Award, he made his orchestral debut with Dimitri Mitropoulos and the New York Philharmonic and "reaped cheers" for his "exhilarating mastery" and "distinguished artistry" (New York Times). Soon followed a tour with the Pittsburgh Symphony performing the Brahms Piano Concerto No. 2. His solo recitals covered all the North American states as well as Canada and major European capitals. For his European orchestral debut with the Berlin Philharmonic, he played Beethoven's "Emperor" Concerto." Die Welt wrote of that performance, "Stanley Babin is a wizard of technique and a magician of sound."

As a composer, Babin presented the world premiere of his own Piano Concerto as soloist with the Israel Philharmonic under Zubin Mehta. Babin's continuing studies of the Northwest Semitic languages, archeology of his desert childhood, and the Hebrew religious texts and cantillations have inspired such compositions as the "Eighth Psalm", "The Eternal Branch", and "Meditations on Job". His other works include a song cycle set to poetry by Emily Dickinson.

Stanley Babin died from lung cancer in May 2010.
