= Evgeny Rapp =

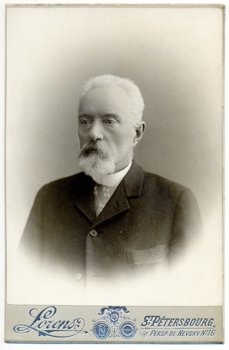
- Rapp in 1903
- Born: Evgeny Kirillovich Rapp; Евгений Кириллович Рапп; 1841; Kromskoy Uyezd, Oryol Governorate, Russian Empire
- Died: 6 December 1904 (aged 62–63); Korfu, Greece
- Occupations: writer, journalist, editor

Evgeny Kirillovich Rapp (Russian: Евгений Кириллович Рапп, 1841—6 December 1904) was a Russian writer, journalist and editor.

Born in the Oryol Governorate into a family of Cyrill Rapp, a Kaluga-based landowner, a relative to the French general Jean Rapp, and Ekaterina Ivanovna Rapp (nee Khitrova), he studied first at the Cadet Corps in Oryol, then the Konstantin Military College and Mikhaylovskaya Artillery Academy, which he graduated in 1862 to start a military career. In 1876, in the rank of an army captain, he went to Serbia and took part in the Montenegrin–Ottoman War as an artillery battery commander.

In 1877—1879 Rapp edited Russkiy Mir, originally a conservative newspaper, which during his years at the helm became more moderate in its approach to the internal affairs. As an essayist, Rapp often wrote on the subject of the raskolniki, calling for tolerance towards their beliefs and customs ("Raskol and Our Legislation", 1878-1879). Under Rapp as editor-in-chief, Russky Mir received three warnings from the officials, the last of which led to a four-month suspension. In 1886, Rapp published the 14-volume literary compilation Romanist (Романист, Novelist). His best-known literary work was the book Captain Kirillych's Serbian Stories (Сербские рассказы капитана Кириллыча), published in Saint Petersburg in 1877.
