= Pauline Wengeroff =

Russian writer (1833–1916)

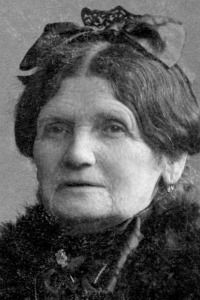
- Born: Pessele Epstein; 1833; Bobrujsk, Minsk Governorate, Russian Empire
- Died: 1916 (aged 82–83)
- Spouse: Chonon Wengeroff (m. 1849; died 1892)
- Children: Semyon Vengerov; Isabelle Vengerova
- Writing career
- Notable work: Memoiren einer Grossmutter. Bilder aus der Kulturgeschichte der Juden Russlands in 19. Jahrhundert (1908, 1910)

Pauline Wengeroff (1833–1916), born Pesya Epstein, was the author of a first-of-its kind memoir by a Jewish woman, in which she refracts a period in Jewish history—the emergence and unfolding of Jewish modernity in nineteenth-century Russian Poland—through the experience of women and families.

Her two-volume memoirs, Memoiren einer Grossmutter, Bilder aus der Kulturgeschichte der Juden Russlands im 19 Jahrhundert ('Memoirs of a Grandmother: Scenes from the Cultural History of the Jews of Russia in the Nineteenth Century'), were originally published in German (with some Hebrew and Yiddish and a few words in Polish) by the German-Jewish publishing house, Poppelauer, beginning in 1908. The work was subsequently re-published several times to rave reviews in the Jewish and non-Jewish presses.

== Biography and writing ==
Wengeroff was born Pesya Epstein (Russian: Песя Эпштейн) in 1833 in Bobruisk, in Minsk Governorate of the Russian Empire (now Belarus), and grew up in Brest-Litovsk, in Grodno Governorate. The first volume of her memoirs reflects the years of her childhood, the 1830s and '40s. It details the lives of traditional Jews in the region Jews called "Lite" (Lithuania), in the years that the Russian Jewish enlightenment movement, the Haskalah, was taking off and Jewish traditionalism and modernity began to clash. Raised in a strictly gendered traditional society, Wengeroff gives a rare, detailed account of the ritual practices and beliefs of women (as well as those of men) in her well-to-do, pious, family, and paints keen vignettes that illustrate the collision between traditionalism and modernity playing out intergenerationally in her own and other families. Volume One, while not uncritical, is a loving elegy to a world that Wengeroff felt was being lost by the time she wrote the full version of her memoirs, toward the end of the nineteenth century.

Wengeroff's second volume is about her adult life, starting with her being groomed for marriage, which was arranged with Chonon (Afanasy) Wengeroff, the son of a wealthy family from Ukraine who were adherents of Habad Hasidism. Here, too, Wengeroff's detailed depiction of the steps toward arranged engagement and the experience of marriage, told from a woman's perspective, provide rare and precious testimony.

Wengeroff's husband Chonon lost his faith while on pilgrimage to his rebbe, the details of which experience she says he never shared. Conflict between them over traditional observance—she had not lost her own faith—quickly ensued and, within their marriage, the couple fought its own version of the larger Jewish struggle over traditionalism and modernity. Notably, Wengeroff insists that there was a gendered nature to that larger struggle, with Jewish men as a class rushing recklessly out of observance in the quest for advancement, while women like herself were capable and desirous of perpetuating both Jewish tradition and engagement with non-Jewish culture. Modernizing Jewish men, however, certainly her own husband, behaved as "tyrants" at home, she claimed, taking from women their traditional domestic power and mandate to impart Jewish belief and practice to children, a loss which led to larger Jewish cultural catastrophe.

Wengeroff writes of the conversion of two sons, Simon (Semyon) and Volodya, when they faced anti-Jewish restrictions. For a woman raised as she was, this was the worst of tragedies which however, she historicizes, explaining it in the absence of a Judaism taught meaningfully by both parents, combined with Jew-hatred in the world in which talented children sought success. In fact, a daughter, Faina, unmentioned in the Memoirs, also converted, and not opportunistically. Wengeroff had seven children; in the Memoirs she speaks only of four, a seemingly bizarre omission in putative memoirs of a "grandmother" (Wengeroff does not mention any grandchildren though she had quite a few). None of her biological offspring maintained any living connection to things Jewish.

Wengeroff, however, took cheer in the emerging "generation of return" in the later nineteenth century: Jewish youth who sought knowledge about and connection to Jewish culture, wishing to revive this in modern ways. She was a Herzlian Zionism and corresponded briefly with Theodor Herzl, whose project she backed wholeheartedly.

After years of striving and competition for success Chonon Wengeroff became director of the Commercial Bank in Minsk and served the City Council from 1880 to 1892. In Minsk, Pauline Wengeroff and her husband founded vocational schools for poor Jewish children. She insisted on Jewish observance in the schools that she had been unable to enforce in her own home.

Wengeroff was also patron to various Jewish artists.

Throughout their lives, several of Wengeroff's children pursued different career paths. Semyon (Simon) Vengerov was a founder of Russian literary criticism. Isabella Vengerova was a prominent pianist and teacher of music. Zinaida Vengerova was a prolific, accomplished Symbolist and feminist author and critic.

== Reception of the memoir ==
Wengeroff's gripping story and her skill in telling it won the interest and support of Jewish cultural leaders, including Gustav Karpeles, a Jewish literary historian; Theodor Zlocisti, a German Jewish Zionist pioneer; and Solomon Schechter, great scholar of Jewish literature and President of the Jewish Theological Seminary of America, who praised the memoir enthusiastically.

== English translations ==
Discontinuous excerpts from Wengeroff's second volume first appeared in English in Lucy Dawidowicz's translation in The Golden Tradition: Jewish Life and Thought in Eastern Europe (New York, 1976). An abridged version of Wengeroff's memoirs, translated by Henny Wenkart, appeared under the title, Rememberings: The World of a Russian-Jewish Woman in the Nineteenth Century (Bethesda: University Press of Maryland, 2000).

An unabridged translation with an extensive introduction and notes was published by Shulamit S. Magnus in 2010 and 2014. In Magnus's book A Woman's Life: Pauline Wengeroff and Memoirs of a Grandmother (Littman, 2016), which she describes as a biography both of the person and of her book, she focuses on how the memoirs came to be in the form in which we have them, and on Wengeroff's puzzling omissions in them, and explores the ability of her Memoirs to be read both as an apologia for tradition—in particular, women's traditional roles—and as a defense of assimilation.

== Awards ==
- 2010: National Jewish Book Award in the Women's Studies category for Memoirs of a Grandmother: Scenes from the Cultural History of the Jews of Russia in the Nineteenth Century, Volume One

== Bibliography ==
- A Woman's Life: Pauline Wengeroff and Memoirs of a Grandmother. The Littman Library of Jewish Civilization (2016)
- Pauline Wengeroff, Memoirs of a Grandmother: Scenes from the Cultural History of the Jews of Russia in the Nineteenth Century 2 vols. annotated translation with critical introduction. Stanford University Press (2010; 2014)
- Magnus, Shulamit S. "Pauline Wengeroff and the Voice of Jewish Modernity." In Gender and Judaism. New York and London: 1995, 181–190.
- Magnus, Shulamit S. "Kol Isha: Women and Pauline Wengeroff's Writing of an Age." Nashim 7 (2004): 28–64.
- Magnus, Shulamit S. "Sins of Youth, Guilt of a Grandmother: M. L. Lilienblum, Pauline Wengeroff, and the Telling of Jewish Modernity in Eastern Europe." Polin: Studies in Polish Jewry 18 ().
- “Pauline Wengeroff: Between Tradition and Modernity, East and West,” in Anthony Polonsky, Hanna Węgrzynek, Andrzej Żbikowski, eds., New Directions in the History of the Jews in the Polish Lands (forthcoming, Academic Studies Press, Newton, MA: 2018)
- “Wengeroff in America: A Study in the Resonance of Conversion and Fear of Dissolution in Early Twentieth Century American Jewry,” Jewish Social Studies (Winter/ Feb., 2016): 142–187.
- “Between East and West: Pauline Wengeroff and her Cultural History of the Jews of Russia ,” in The German-Jewish Experience Revisited, eds. Steven Aschheim and Vivian Liska (De Gruyter, 2015)
- “How Does a Woman Write? Or, Pauline Wengeroff’s Room of Her Own,” in Gender and Jewish History, ed. Deborah Dash Moore and Marion Kaplan, Indiana University Press, 2010: 13-26
- Pauline Wengeroff,” The YIVO Encyclopedia Encyclopedia in Eastern Europe (2009)
- “Sins of Youth, Guilt of a Grandmother: M. L. Lilienblum, Pauline Wengeroff, and the Telling of Jewish Modernity in Eastern Europe,” POLIN: Studies in Polish Jewry 18 (2005): 87-120
- “Kol Isha: Women and Pauline Wengeroff’’s Writing of an Age,” Nashim: A Journal of Jewish Women's Studies and Gender Issues, Spring, No. 7 (Jerusalem, 2004): 28-64 (invited)
- “Pauline Wengeroff “; “Ritual;” Jewish Women, A Comprehensive Historical Encyclopedia, Paula Hyman and Dalia Ofer, eds. (Shalvi Publishing, Jerusalem, 2004), CD ROM.
- Wengeroff, Pauline. Rememberings: The World of a Russian-JewishWoman in the Nineteenth Century. Translated by Henny Wenkart. Edited with an Afterword by Bernard D. Cooperman. Bethesda: University Press of Maryland, 2000.
- Wengeroff, Pauline. Memoiren einer Grossmutter: Bilder aus der Kulturgeschichte der Juden Russlands im 19 Jahrhundert. Vol. 1, Berlin: 1908; republished with Vol. 2, 1910; 1913; 1919; 1922.
- Louis Greenberg. The Jews in Russia, the Struggle for Emancipation, vol. 1: 62. New York: 1976.
- Shaul Ginsburg. Historishe verk, vol. 2: 82–90. New York: 1937
- Sinai Leichter. "Zichronoteha shel savta minskait Paulina Wengeroff." In Minsk, Ir va-Em, edited by Shlomo Even-Shoshan
