= Nikolai Minsky =

Russian poet

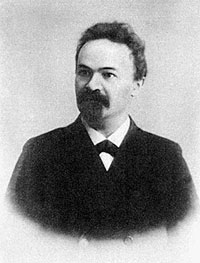
Nikolai Minsky

Nikolai Minsky and Nikolai Maksimovich Minsky (Russian: Никола́й Макси́мович Ми́нский) are pseudonyms of Nikolai Maksimovich Vilenkin (Виле́нкин; 1855–1937), a mystical writer and poet of the Silver Age of Russian Poetry.

== Early life and education ==
Born in Glubokoe (now Hlybokaye, Belarus) to poor Jewish parents, he was orphaned early. He was brought up, and finished his schooling, in Minsk. He took his pseudonym from the city he grew up in. He completed his law degree at the University of Saint Petersburg in 1879.

== Personal life and death ==
He was married to Zinaida Vengerova, a noted literary critic in 1925. She was his third wife.

Minsky died in Paris in 1937, and is buried at the Père Lachaise Cemetery.

== Works ==
Minsky's career as a poet began in 1876, when he wrote poems on "civil topics". His poem, A Slav's Dream, for instance, was written in support of Bulgaria's struggle against the Turks. In 1889, he began work on the book With the Light of Conscience, employing a deliberately pompous tone to present its theory of "meonism" (me on being Greek for "nonexistent"). The objective of the work is to show that the main purpose of humanity is "nonexistence itself".

In 1900, Dmitri Merezhkovsky, Minsky, Zinaida Gippius, Vasily Rozanov, and others founded the Religious-Philosophical Society in Saint Petersburg. Minsky, like the majority of intellectuals, sympathized with the revolution and social democracy. He was the nominal editor of the legal Bolshevik newspaper New Life.

After the revolution was defeated in 1905, Minsky became one of the leaders of Russian decadence and symbolism. These ideas represented the cult of beauty and enjoyment and declared war on the public tendencies that threatened to damage the "cleanliness" of artistic creation. A minor scandal was recorded involving Minsky after he instigated a ritual on May 2, 1905 at his home in Saint Petersburg. It involved drinking the "donated" blood of Zinaida Vengerova, which was intended as a protoecumenical bonding ceremony. It was criticized for the perceived esoteric and anti-Semitic overtones. After 1905, he lived abroad.

A religious-philosophical concept is presented in the treatises With the Light of Conscience (1890) and The Religion of the Future (1905). Other publications include the collection of verses From the Gloom to the Light (1922) and various dramas and translations.

== See also ==
- Meontology
