= Vladimir Leontyevich Komarov =

Russian botanist (1869–1945)

Vladimir Komarov
- Владимир Комаров
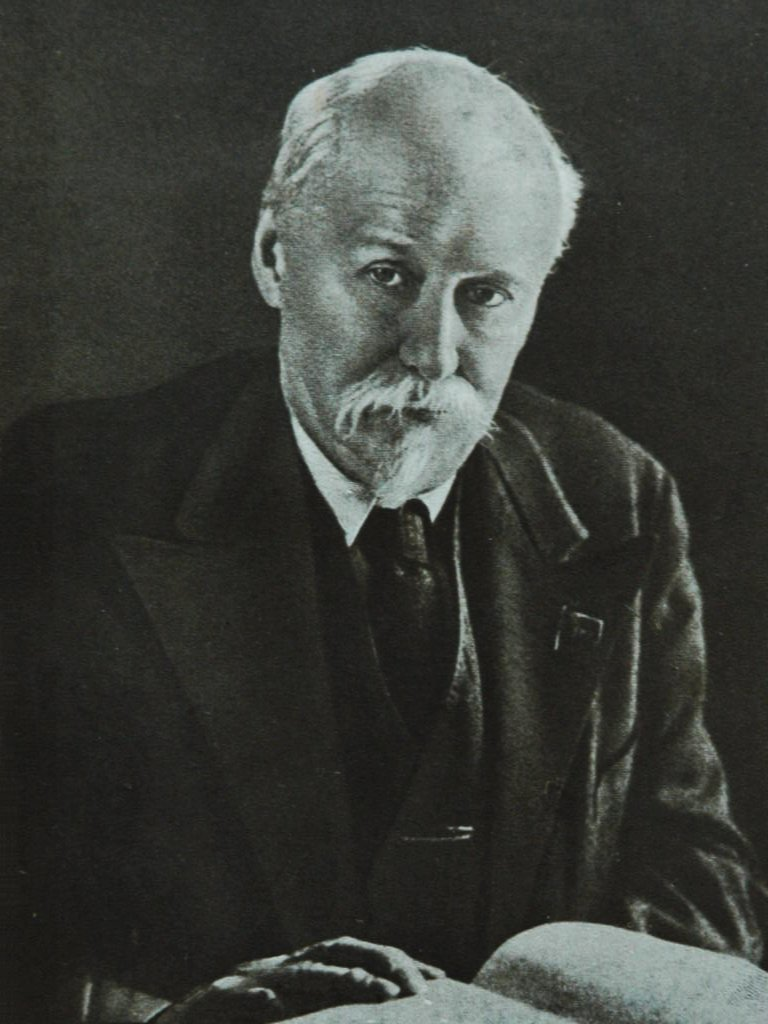
- Komarov in 1945
- Born: 13 October 1869; Saint Petersburg, Russian Empire
- Died: 5 December 1945 (aged 76); Moscow, Russian SFSR, Soviet Union
- Scientific career
- Fields: Botany

Signature
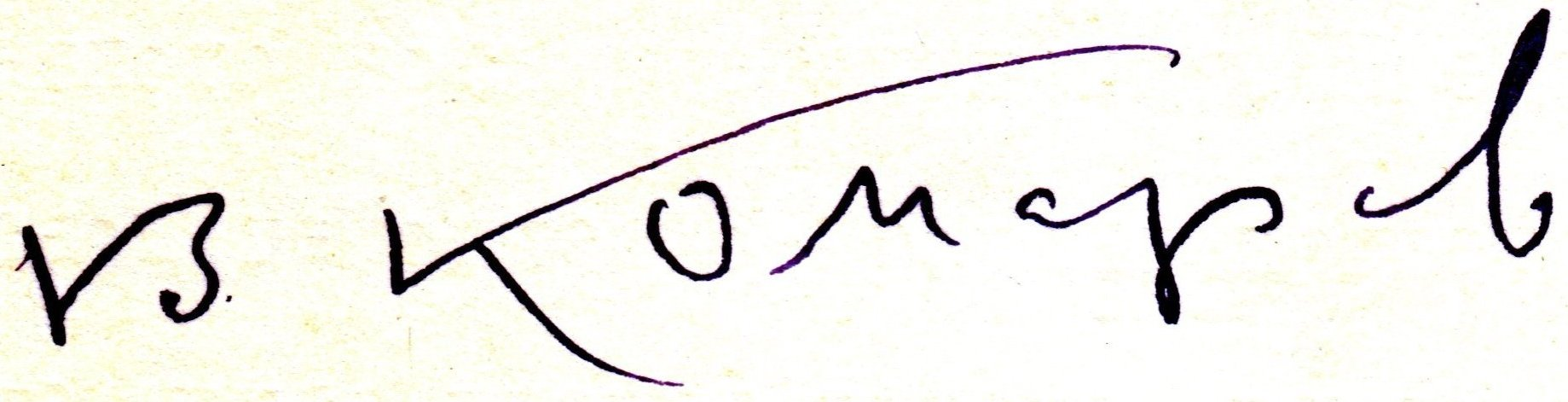

Vladimir Leontyevich Komarov (Russian: Владимир Леонтьевич Комаров; 13 October [O.S. 1 October] 1869 – 5 December 1945) was a Russian botanist who served as President of the Academy of Sciences of the USSR from 1936 until his death in 1945.

Komarov was senior editor of the Flora of the USSR, a comprehensive catalog of Soviet plant species (in full comprising 30 volumes published between 1934 and 1960).

== Biography ==
Of noble birth, Komarov was the son of an officer who died young from a wound sustained during the siege of Ura-Tyube. His godfather was his uncle Vissarion Komarov. Three of his father's brothers were full generals in the Tsarist army. This "socially alien" background made him an easy figure to manipulate during Stalin's regime.

His academic journey began under the mentorship of prominent botanists like Andrey Beketov, Karl Maximovich, Ivan Borodin, and Sergey Korzhinsky. He was a graduate of St. Petersburg University where he received a degree in botany in 1894. He worked as a professor at the university in the period 1898–1934.

His early career was marked by extensive fieldwork, including expeditions to Central Asia (1892–93), the Far East, Manchuria, Korea (1895–97), Eastern Sayans (1902), Kamchatka (1908–09), and the South Ussuri region (1913). These expeditions resulted in rich herbarium collections, laying the foundation for his contributions to plant taxonomy and geography. From 1895 until 1899 he was co-editor of the exsiccata Fungi Rossiae exsiccati. Komarov’s magnum opus was his five-volume Flora of Manchuria (1901–07), which described 1,700 plant species (84 of which were newly identified), earning him recognition both in Russia and abroad.

Korzhinsky and Komarov introduced the concept of “race” in botany and made significant contributions to the understanding of plant speciation, as well as the evolution of the plant world. Komarov developed the morpho-geographical method in plant systematics, a pioneering approach that integrated morphology and geographical distribution. His attitude to genetics was rather sceptical. His later works, such as The Origin of Plants (1933) and The Doctrine of Species in Plants (1940), reflect his deep engagement with evolutionary botany and plant classification.

In 1930, Komarov succeeded I. P. Borodin as president of the All-Union Botanical Society. In 1940, he succeeded Yuly Shokalsky as honorary president of the Soviet Geographical Society. He was elected a corresponding member of the Russian Academy of Sciences in 1914 and its full member in 1920. He was a deputy at the Supreme Soviet from 1938 to 1945. His leadership extended to his work at the St. Petersburg Botanical Garden, where he began working in 1899. Under his leadership, it evolved into the Botanical Institute of the Academy of Sciences, currently known as the Komarov Botanical Institute.

As Vice-President of the Academy of Sciences (from 1930) and its President (from 1936), Komarov actively promoted the idea of decentralizing scientific research and resources. Under his guidance, the Far Eastern, Ural, Armenian, Georgian, and other branches of the Academy of Sciences were established (some of which later developed into the national academies of the Soviet republics).

=== Awards and legacy ===
Komarov was awarded the Stalin Prize in 1941 and 1942 and the Hero of Socialist Labour in 1943. The Academy of Sciences established the Komarov Prize to recognize outstanding contributions to botany.

In 1939, botanist Yevgeny Korovin published a genus of flowering plants (in the family Apiaceae), from Uzbekistan, as Komarovia in his honour (a name since replaced by Komaroviopsis).

The village of Kellomäki near Saint Petersburg was renamed Komarovo after him. The Komarov Botanical Institute and the Komarov volcano were also given his name.

== List of selected publications ==
- Coniferae of Manchuria. Trudy Imp. S.Peterburgsk. Obsc. 32: 230-241 (1902).
- De Gymnospermis nonnullis Asiaticis I, II. Bot. Mater. Gerb. Glavn. Bot. Sada RSFSR 4: 177–181, 5: 25-32 (1923–1924).
- Florae peninsulae Kamtschatka (1927).
- Komarov, V. L., ed. (1934–1960). Flora of the U.S.S.R. 30 vols. Leningrad: Botanicheskii institut akademii nauk SSSR.

Academic offices
Preceded by Alexander Karpinsky	President of the Academy of Sciences of the USSR; 1936–1945	Succeeded by Sergey Vavilov
