= Zinaida Vengerova =

Russian literary critic and translator (1867–1941)

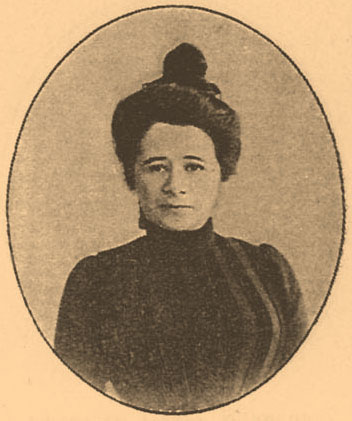
- Vengerova in Brockhaus and Efron Encyclopedic Dictionary
- Born: April 19, 1867; Sveaborg, Grand Duchy of Finland, Russian Empire
- Died: 1941 (aged 73–74); New York City, U.S.
- Education: Institute of Higher Studies for Women, St. Petersburg (European Literature); Sorbonne
- Occupations: Literary critic; author
- Spouse: Nikolai Minsky (m. 1925)
- Writing career
- Years active: 1908–1941
- Literary movement: Symbolism, Decadent movement

Zinaida Afanasyevna Vengerova (Russian: Зинаида Афанасьевна Венгерова; April 19, 1867 – 1941) was a Russian literary critic and translator. She is considered one of the few women who were highly educated during her time, having studied in universities in Russia, France, and England. For her works, she had been described as "a literary ambassador between East and West". She also influenced the first generation of Russian symbolists through her writings about French symbolism.

== Biography ==
Vengerova was born on April 19, 1867, in Sveaborg. Her mother, Pauline, came from a wealthy family and was also a published author. Her grandfather on her mother's side, Ieguda Epstein, was noted for his commentaries about the Talmud. Her father, Chonon (Afanasy), was a banker in Minsk. Vengerova had two brothers and four sisters. Semyon, the older of her two brothers, became an author, academic, literary historian, and, like Vengerova, a literary critic. He is considered a pioneer of Russian literary history.

Vengerova grew up in Saint Petersburg before her family moved to Minsk, where she completed her gymnasium education in 1881. At an early age, Vengerova was exposed to literature and foreign languages. She continued her education in Vienna, where she studied in Western European literature and went back to St. Petersburg to study at the Institute of Higher Studies for Women from 1884 to 1887.

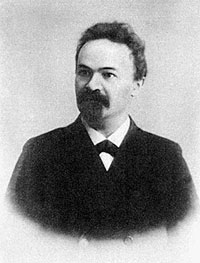
Nikolai Minsky

Vengerova relocated to Paris, where she took classes in literature at the Sorbonne. She became acquainted with and was a long-time friend of Olga Petit, the first French woman to become a lawyer. In 1925, Vengerova married the symbolist poet Nikolai Minsky.

Vengerova was an émigré in Berlin, then in Paris, and then in London. She went to live with her sister Isabelle Vengerova – a noted pianist – in New York after her husband's death in 1937 and lived there for four years. She died in 1941.

== Works ==
Vengerova moved to London to work for the British Museum. From 1908 to 1912, she built her reputation in England serving as a specialist in Russian literature. By 1917, her translation of B.V. Savinkov's The Pale Horse was published in London and Dublin.

Vengerova is known for her criticism of conservatism as demonstrated in her approach to Russian literary criticism amid the new literary movements. She also stressed individuality and criticized portrayals of divisions between men and women based on biology.

Aside from her translation works, she wrote essays on noted literary figures such as Henrik Ibsen, Paul Verlaine, Arthur Rimbaud, H. G. Wells, Ezra Pound, Arthur Schnitzler, and Gerhart Hauptmann, among others. She also wrote a column covering European literature for Vestnik Evropy (The Herald of Europe) periodical for fifteen years.

=== Decadence and symbolism ===
Vengerova and her husband became active in the Russian decadence and symbolism movements, which celebrated the cult of beauty and enjoyment. She pioneered Decadence as a "new art" and single-handedly constructed for Russians her interpretation of French Symbolism. A description of this approach was contained in her work, Symbolist Poets in France. This was embraced by the Russian intellectuals, who favored Symbolism as self-appellation and the polemical potential of the way Vengerova's notion contrasted decadence and symbolism. The conflict or "factional squabble" that this created is said to designate what one rejected or accepted in "new art".

In 1905, she became the center of a minor controversy involving its adherents. Her husband instigated a protoecumenical ritual participated in by a group of intellectuals. It included drinking the "donated" blood of Vengerova. The event, which was intended as a bonding ritual, was described in the media as esoteric and anti-Semitic. Vengerova and her husband were both Jewish.

=== Publications ===
- Symbolist Poets in France (Poety-simvolisty vo Frantsii) (1892);
- Literary Characteristics (1897–1910);
- English Writers of the 19th Century (1913);
- English Futurists (Angliiskie Futuristy) (1915);
- Sobranīe sochinenīĭ.

== Sources ==
- "Венгерова, Зинаида Афанасьевна" . Brockhaus and Efron Encyclopedic Dictionary (in Russian). 1906.
