= Isabelle Vengerova =

American pianist (1877–1956)

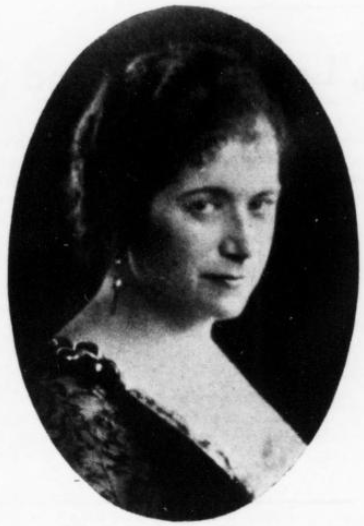
- Vengerova in 1927

Background information
- Born: 1 March 1877; Minsk, Russian Empire
- Died: 7 February 1956 (aged 78) New York City, U.S.
- Genres: Classical
- Occupations: Pianist; music teacher
- Instrument: Piano
- Years active: 1906–1956

Isabelle Vengerova (born Izabella Afanasyevna Vengerova; (Note: Russian: Изабелла Афанасьевна Венгерова.) 1 March [O.S. 17 February] 1877 – 7 February 1956) was a Russian and American pianist and music teacher.

== Life ==
Izabella Afanasyevna Vengerova was born in Minsk in the Russian Empire (present-day Belarus) into the family of Pauline Vengerova and her husband, Chonon. Her father was a banker and community worker, while her mother was a writer who gained prominence with Memoirs of a Grandmother: Pictures of the Cultural History of Russian Jews in the Nineteenth Century (1908–1910). Her elder brother, Semyon, was a literary historian, and her sister, Zinaida, was a literary critic and writer on Russian culture.

She studied the piano at the Vienna Conservatory with Josef Dachs, and privately with Theodor Leschetizky; in Saint Petersburg she studied with Anna Yesipova. In Vienna, she was a good friend of Arthur Schnitzler. From 1906 to 1920, she taught at the Imperial Conservatory in St. Petersburg and then toured the Soviet Union and Western Europe from 1920 to 1923, when she settled in the United States. While still in St. Petersburg in 1910, she recorded three pieces on Welte-Mignon player piano music rolls.

In 1924, she helped found the Curtis Institute, and in 1933, joined the faculty of the Mannes College, teaching at both institutions until her death in New York City in 1956. She made her debut with the Detroit Symphony Orchestra in 1925. Vengerova was also known for her painstaking attention to detail and for a psychological insight that brought out the best in each pupil. While she denied having a particular method, she drilled all students in techniques designed to achieve expressive playing and beautiful tone, keeping the fingers close to the keys for evenness and a seamless legato; playing deeply in the keys while using the weight of the forearm and a flexible wrist to achieve a full singing tone without harshness, and controlling tone by higher or lower positions of the wrist.

Among her pupils were Blanche Abram, Stanley Babin, Samuel Barber, Ralph Berkowitz, Leonard Bernstein, Anthony di Bonaventura, Lukas Foss, Gary Graffman, Lilian Kallir, Gilbert Kalish, Jacob Lateiner, Julien Musafia, Leonard Pennario, Menahem Pressler, Carl Schachter, Abbey Simon, Dimitri Tiomkin, Ronald Turini, Leon Whitesell, Sidney Foster, Ruth Slenczynska, and Sylvia Zaremba.

Isabelle was the sister of Zinaida Vengerova, a noted literary critic, and Semyon, a literary and intellectual historian. She was the maternal aunt and first teacher of Nicolas Slonimsky, who reports in his autobiography Perfect Pitch that as a young girl, his aunt, was kissed on the forehead by Johannes Brahms.

== Sources ==
- Asadowski, Konstantin; Müller, Martin Anton (2022). "Die Korrespondenz von Arthur Schnitzler mit Isabella und Zinaida Vengerova". Hofmannsthal – Jahrbuch zur europäischen Moderne. Rombach Wissenschaft – ein Verlag in der Nomos Verlagsgesellschaft. pp. 7–94. doi:10.5771/9783968219257-7. ISBN 978-3-96821-925-7.
- Schick, Robert D. (1 January 1982). The Vengerova System of Piano Playing. Penn State Press. ISBN 978-0-271-03547-5.
- Slonimsky, Nicolas (1988). Perfect Pitch: A Life Story. Oxford University Press. ISBN 978-0-19-315155-0.
- Smith, Charles Davis; Howe, Richard J. (1994). The Welte-Mignon: Its Music and Musicians. Vestal Press. ISBN 978-1-879511-17-0.
