= Semyon Vengerov =

Russian literary historian (1855–1920)

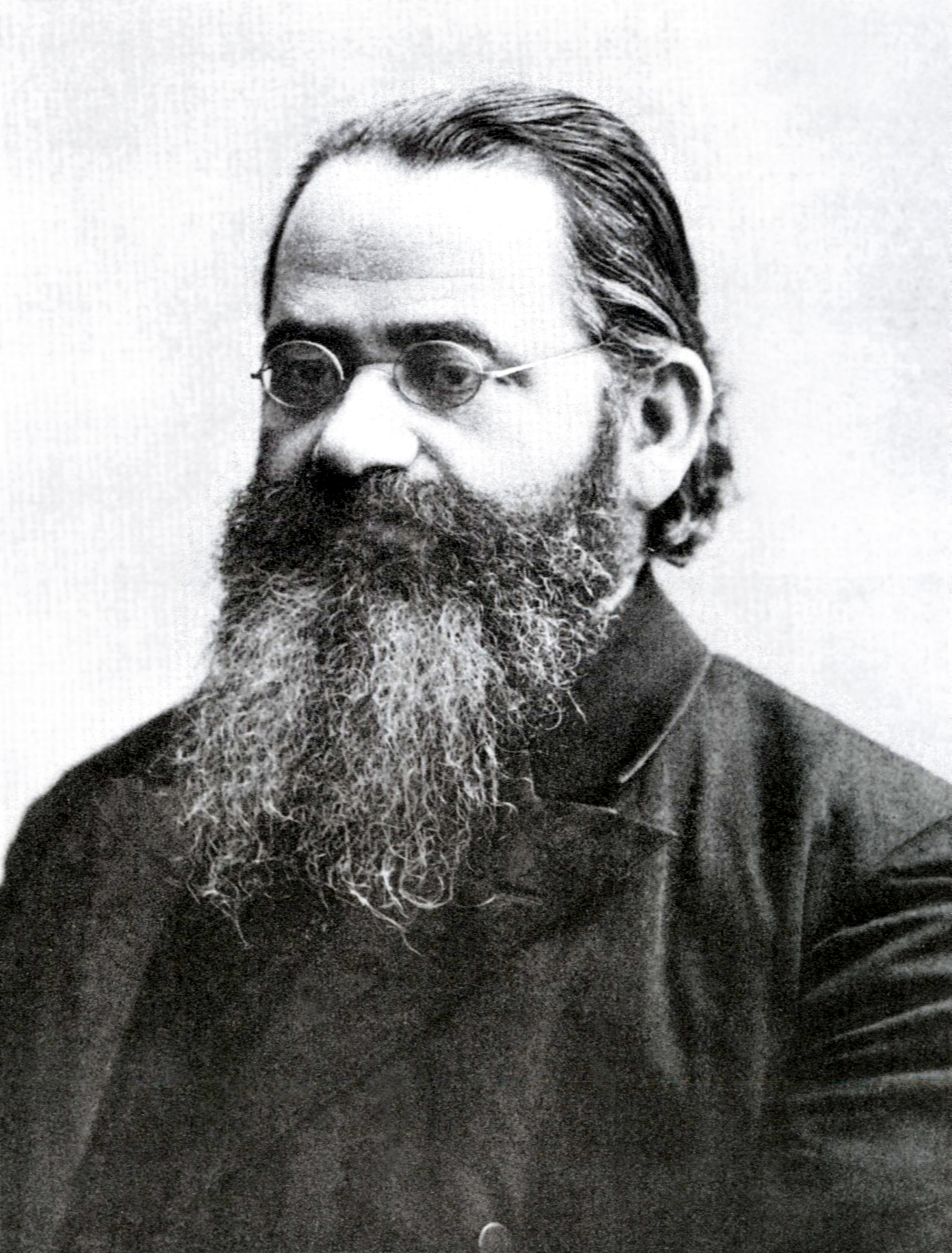
Semyon A. Vengerov

Semyon Afanasyevich Vengerov (Russian: Семён Афана́сьевич Венге́ров; 17 April [O.S. 5 April] 1855, Lubny, Poltava Governorate – 14 September 1920, Petrograd) was a Russian literary historian during the Belle Époque.

== Life ==
Vengerov was the son of Chonon (Afanasy) Vengerov and memoirist Pauline Wengeroff, a prominent Jewish family. His parents were of the few acculturated Russian Jews, and sent him to a Christian school, of which he once was expelled for refusing to kneel before an icon. As academic careers were barred to Jews, he converted to Orthodoxy after matriculating. He was the pater familias of an artistic clan that included his sisters Isabelle Vengerova, a co-founder of the Curtis Institute in Philadelphia, and Zinaida Vengerova, a noted literary critic, as well as nephew Nicolas Slonimsky, a Russian-American composer.

Vengerov studiously researched the careers of "second-tier" Russian authors of the 19th and (especially) 18th centuries. His materials proved indispensable for several generations of Russian literary historians. His archives contain the largest private collection of Dostoyevsky's letters and manuscripts. He was a great admirer of Ivan Turgenev, the subject of his first major work of criticism (approved by Turgenev himself).

Vengerov also presided over an influential Pushkin seminar and the Russian Book Chamber (which he had helped found). In the early 20th century he issued a detailed overview of recent Russian literature and edited the grand Brockhaus-Efron edition of Pushkin's works (1907–16) in 6 large quarto volumes; D. S. Mirsky refers to this edition as "a monument of infinite industry and infinite bad taste".

Vengerov's interest in academic biographism gained him a reputation of being a positivist compiler of biographical data. According to Mirsky, his works contain "a great mass of prefatory, commentatory, and biographical matter, most of which is more or less worthless". In Noise of Time, Osip Mandelshtam claimed that Vengerov had "understood nothing in Russian literature and studied Pushkin as a professional task".

For Vengerov, the greatest merit of Russian literature was its essential didacticism: "For the Russian reader, literature has always been a holy thing; contact with it makes him purer and better, and he always relates to it with a feeling of real religiosity".

== Sources ==
- "Венгеров, Семен Афанасьевич" . Brockhaus and Efron Encyclopedic Dictionary (in Russian). 1906.
