= 1781 in literature =

This article contains information about the literary events and publications of 1781.

== Events ==
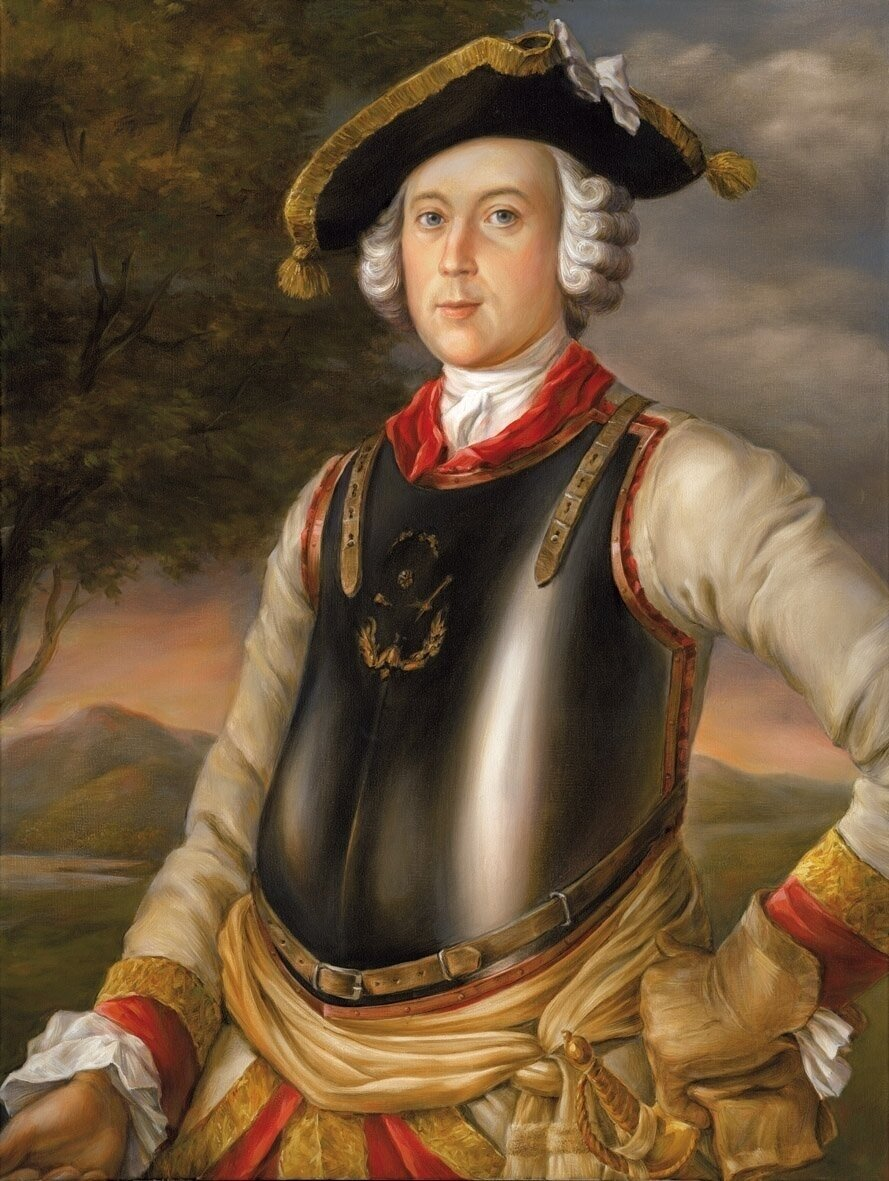
c. 1740 portrait of the real Baron Munchausen

- March 27 – George Crabbe writes to Edmund Burke, enclosing examples of his work. The outcome is the publication of Crabbe's poem The Library.
- August 5 – The Czech meteorologist and geographer Antonín Strnad completes an inventory of the contents of the Clementinum in Prague, which becomes a national library.
- unknown date – Rudolf Erich Raspe (anonymously) publishes "M-h-s-nsche Geschichten" ("M-h-s-n Stories") in the Berlin humor magazine Vade mecum für lustige Leute ("Handbook for Fun-loving People"), the first appearance of Baron Munchausen in fiction.

== New books ==
=== Fiction ===
- Robert Bage – Mount Henneth
- Christoph Friedrich Bretzner – Belmont und Constanze
- William Combe – Letters of an Italian Nun and an English Gentleman
- Eugenio Espejo – La ciencia blancardina
- Benjamin Franklin – A Letter To A Royal Academy
- Charles Johnstone – The History of John Juniper
- Henry Mackenzie – Julia de Roubignei
- Nicolas Restif de la Bretonne – La Découverte Australe par un Homme-Volant
- Glocester Ridley – Melanpus
- Anna Seward – Monody on Major André

=== Children ===
- Mrs. Barbauld – Hymns in Prose for Children
- Joachim Heinrich Campe – Die Entdeckung von Amerika (Discovery of America)

=== Drama ===
- Miles Peter Andrews – Dissipation
- Frances Brooke – The Siege of Sinope
- Hannah Cowley – The World as it Goes
- Elizabeth Craven – The Miniature Picture
- John Delap – The Royal Suppliants
- Johann Wolfgang von Goethe – Iphigenia in Tauris (revised version)
- Thomas Holcroft – Duplicity
- Elizabeth Inchbald – Polygamy
- Robert Jephson – The Count of Narbonne
- John O'Keeffe – The Agreeable Surprise
- Samuel Jackson Pratt – The Fair Circassian
- Friedrich Schiller – The Robbers (Die Räuber, published)
- Richard Brinsley Sheridan
  - The Critic (published)
  - A Trip to Scarborough

=== Poetry ===
- William Cowper – Anti-Thelyphthora
- George Crabbe – The Library
- Maria De Fleury – Poems, Occasioned by the Confinement and Acquittal of the Right Honourable Lord George Gordon, President of the Protestant Association
- Santa Rita Durão – Caramuru
- Anne Francis – A Poetical Translation of the Song of Solomon
- Philip Freneau – The British Prison-Ship
- William Hayley – The Triumphs of Temper
- George Keate – Works
- Samuel Jackson Pratt – Sympathy

=== Non-fiction ===
- Maria De Fleury – Unrighteous Abuse Detected and Chastised
- Mary Deverell – Sermons on the Following Subjects...
- Edward Gibbon – Volumes II and III of The History of the Decline and Fall of the Roman Empire
- Henry Home – Loose Hints Upon Education
- Samuel Johnson
  - The Beauties of Johnson
  - Lives of the Most Eminent English Poets
- Immanuel Kant – Critique of Pure Reason
- John Moore – A View of Society and Manners in Italy
- John Newton – Cardiphonia
- John Nichols – Biographical Anecdotes of William Hogarth
- Magister Pianco (Hans Heinrich von Ecker und Eckhoffen) – Der Rosenkreutzer in seiner Blösse
- Jean-Jacques Rousseau – Essai sur l'origine des langues

== Births ==
- January 26 – Ludwig Achim von Arnim, German poet and novelist (died 1831)
- January 30 – Adelbert von Chamisso, German poet and botanist (died 1838)
- February 26 – Peter Andresen Oelrichs, Heligoland-born lexicographer (died 1869)
- March 17 – Ebenezer Elliott, English poet (died 1849)
- May 14 – Friedrich Ludwig Georg von Raumer, German historian (died 1873)
- June 12 (probable) – Christian Isobel Johnstone, Scottish journalist and novelist (died 1857)
- November 3 – Sarah Elizabeth Utterson, English translator and short story writer (died 1851)
- November 6 – Lucy Aikin (Mary Godolphin), English historical writer (died 1864)
- November 29 – Andrés Bello, Venezuelan polymath (died 1865)
- December 6 – Charlotte von Ahlefeld, German novelist (died 1849)
- December 11 – David Brewster, Scottish scientist and writer (died 1868)

== Deaths ==
- February 15 – Gotthold Ephraim Lessing, German philosopher and dramatist (born 1729)
- February 22 – Anna Magdalena Godiche, Danish book printer and publisher (born 1721)
- February 24 – Edward Capell, English Shakespeare scholar (born 1713)
- March 1 – Jean-Baptiste de La Curne de Sainte-Palaye, French historian, classicist and lexicographer (born 1697)
- March 17 – Johannes Ewald, Danish dramatist and poet (born 1743)
- May 8 – Richard Jago, English poet and cleric (born 1715)
- June 24 – Anna Miller, English poet and salon hostess (born 1741)
- September 11 – Johann August Ernesti, German theologian and philologist (born 1707)
- November 2 – José Francisco de Isla, Spanish satirist (born 1703)
- November 4 – Johann Nikolaus Götz, German poet (born 1721)
- December 7 – Judith Madan, English poet (born 1702)
