= 1801 in literature =

This article contains information about the literary events and publications of 1801.

== Events ==
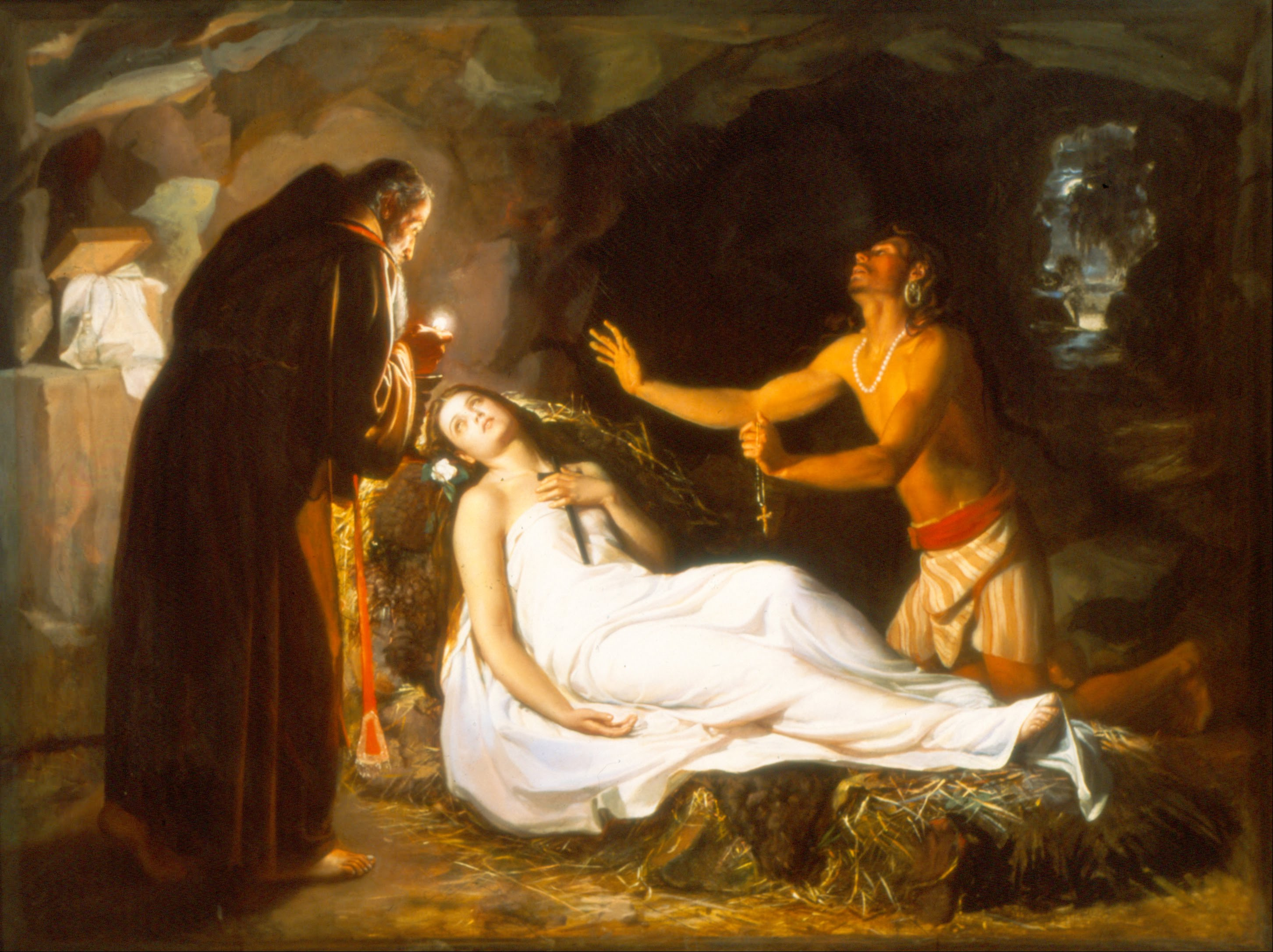
An adaptation of Atala in painting. Últimos momentos de Atala by Luis Monroy, 1871

- April 1 – A letter from "the author of Génie du christianisme" (François-René de Chateaubriand) is published in Le Publiciste, Chateaubriand having returned to France the previous year under an amnesty issued to émigrés.
- April 2 – Battle of Copenhagen: In recognition of the English attack on Copenhagen, Adam Oehlenschläger produces his first dramatic sketch, April the Second 1801.
- April – John Borthwick Gilchrist is appointed a professor at Fort William College in Calcutta, India, where he establishes the Hindusthani Press.
- May – Jane Austen moves with her family to Bath.
- unknown dates
  - The second edition of Specimens of the Early English Poets, edited by George Ellis and covering poems from the Old English through to the 17th century, is influential in acquainting the general reading public with Middle English poetry, going through a further 4 editions.
  - The first complete Bible translation into Scottish Gaelic, Am Bìoball Gàidhlig, is published.

== New books ==
=== Fiction ===
- François-René de Chateaubriand – Atala
- Sophie Ristaud Cottin – Malvina
- Anne Seymour Damer – Belmour
- Maria Edgeworth – Belinda
- Elizabeth Helme – St. Margaret's Cave
- Rachel Hunter – Letitia
- Isabella Kelly – Ruthinglenne
- Sophia King – The Fatal Secret
- Mary Meeke – Which is the Man
- Amelia Opie – The Father and Daughter
- Eliza Parsons – The Peasant of Ardenne Forest

=== Children ===
- Christoph von Schmid – Biblische Geschichte für Kinder (Bible Stories for Children)
- Priscilla Wakefield – The Juvenile Travellers: Containing the Remarks of a Family during a Tour through the Principal States and Kingdoms of Europe

=== Drama ===
- Heinrich Joseph von Collin – Regulus
- George Colman the Younger – The Poor Gentleman
- William Godwin – Abbas, King of Persia (written)
- Matthew Lewis
  - Adelmorn, the Outlaw
  - Alfonso, King of Castile
- Thomas Moore and Michael Kelly (tenor) – The Gypsy Prince
- Frederick Reynolds – Folly as it Flies
- Friedrich Schiller
  - The Maid of Orleans (Die Jungfrau von Orleans)
  - Maria Stuart
- William Sotheby – Julian and Agnes

=== Poetry ===
- Henry James Pye – Alfred
- William Wordsworth and Samuel Taylor Coleridge – Lyrical Ballads (2nd edition, dated 1800)

=== Non-fiction ===
- Francis Barrett – The Magus, or Celestial Intelligencer
- Elizabeth Hamilton – Letters on the Elementary Principles of Education
- Arthur Murphy – Life of David Garrick
- Jane West – Letters to a Young Man

== Births ==
- January 14 – Jane Welsh Carlyle, Scottish writer, wife of Thomas Carlyle (died 1866)
- February 13 – János Kardos, Hungarian evangelical priest, teacher and writer (died 1875)
- February 16 – Frederic Madden, English palaeographer (died 1873)
- February 21 – Cardinal John Henry Newman, English theologian and autobiographer (died 1890)
- March 4 – Karl Rudolf Hagenbach, Swiss theologian and historian (died 1874)
- March 15 – George Perkins Marsh, American philologist (died 1882)
- May 9 – Ulrika von Strussenfelt, Swedish novelist (died 1873)
- May 31 – Johann Georg Baiter, Swiss philologist and textual critic (died 1877)
- June 24 – Caroline Clive, English writer (died 1873)
- August 10 – Christian Hermann Weisse, German Protestant religious philosopher (died 1866)
- September 4 – Alfred d'Orsay, French wit and dandy (died 1852)
- September 7 – Hortense Allart, Milanese-born French feminist novelist (died 1879)
- November 3 – Karl Baedeker, German guidebook publisher (died 1859)
- November 10 – Vladimir Dal, Russian lexicographer (died 1872)
- November 22 – Abraham Hayward, English man of letters (died 1884)
- November 24 – Ludwig Bechstein, German writer and collector of folk tales (died 1860)
- December 4 – Karl Ludwig Michelet, German philosopher (died 1893)
- December 7 – Johann Nestroy, Austrian dramatist (died 1862)
- December 11 – Christian Dietrich Grabbe, German dramatist (died 1836)
- December 12 – Edward Moxon, English poet and publisher (died 1858)
- unknown dates
  - Franciszek Ksawery Godebski, Polish writer (died 1869)
  - Cynthia Taggart, American poet (died 1849)

== Deaths ==
- January 2 – Johann Kaspar Lavater, Swiss poet (born 1741)
- January 9 – Margaretta Faugères, American playwright, poet and political activist (born 1771)
- January 13 – Robert Orme, English historian of India (born 1728)
- March 14 – Ignacy Krasicki, Polish poet and prince-bishop (born 1735)
- March 21 – John Holt, English scholar (born 1743)
- March 25 – Novalis, German poet (born 1772)
- April 11 – Antoine de Rivarol, French scholar and epigrammatist (born 1753)
- September 1 – Robert Bage, English novelist (born 1728)
- September 7 – Giovanni Andrea Lazzarini, Italian painter, poet and art historian (born 1710)
- September 23 – Thomas Nowell, Welsh-born controversialist and historian (born c. 1730)
- November 5 – Motoori Norinaga, Japanese philologist and scholar (born 1730)
- December 25 – Hester Chapone, English writer of conduct books (born 1727)
