= 1869 in literature =

This article contains information about the literary events and publications of 1869.

== Events ==
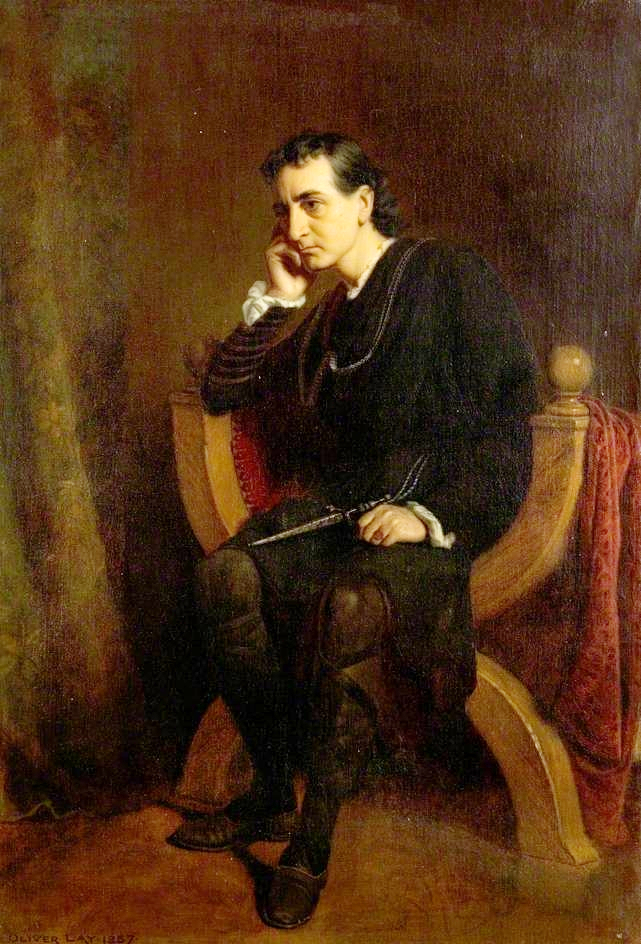
Edwin Booth as Hamlet, 1887 by Oliver Ingraham Lay

- February 3 – Booth's Theatre opens on Manhattan with the owner, Edwin Booth, playing the male lead in William Shakespeare's Romeo and Juliet.
- May 10 – As a protest against her drama school having been closed down by the Russian authorities, Swedish-born actress Hedvig Raa-Winterhjelm delivers the lines in her next performance, Aleksis Kivi's Lea, in the Finnish language, the first time it has been spoken in the public theatre in Finland.
- May 22 – Serial publication of Anthony Trollope's novel He Knew He Was Right concludes and it appears in London as the first book to include a fictional private investigator, ex-policeman Samuel Bozzle.
- August
  - Ambrose Bierce, writing a satirical column for the San Francisco News Letter, begins to produce the cynical definitions which will eventually become The Devil's Dictionary.
  - Macmillan Publishing opens its first American office in New York City, headed by George Edward Brett.
- October 5 – Model, poet and artist Elizabeth Siddal (d. 1862) is exhumed by Charles Augustus Howell at Highgate Cemetery in London in order to recover the manuscript of Dante Gabriel Rossetti's Poems buried with her.
- December – Publication of Leo Tolstoy's novel War and Peace («Война и миръ», Voyna i mir) complete in book form concludes. It is printed in Moscow and sold by the author on subscription.
- unknown dates – Eiríkur Magnússon and William Morris publish their first translations of Old Icelandic sagas into English: Grettis Saga: The Story of Grettir the Strong (from Grettis saga) and The Story of Gunnlaug the Worm-tongue and Raven the Skald (from Gunnlaugs saga ormstungu).

== New books ==
=== Fiction ===
- Thomas Bailey Aldrich – The Story of a Bad Boy
- Ignacio Manuel Altamirano – Clemencia (debut novel)
- Horatio Alger, Jr. – Luck and Pluck
- R. M. Ballantyne – Erling the Bold
- R. D. Blackmore – Lorna Doone
- Fyodor Dostoyevsky – The Idiot (Идіотъ)
- Alexandre Dumas, père – The Knight of Sainte-Hermine (Le Chevalier de Sainte-Hermine, unfinished; first published 2005)
- Gustave Flaubert – Sentimental Education (L'Éducation sentimentale)
- Émile Gaboriau – Monsieur Lecoq
- Ivan Goncharov – The Precipice (Обрыв)
- Edmond and Jules de Goncourt – Madame Gervaisais
- Victor Hugo – The Man Who Laughs (L'Homme qui rit)
- Sheridan Le Fanu – The Wyvern Mystery
- Nikolai Leskov – Old Years in Plodomasovo («Ста′рые го′ды в селе′ Плодома′сове» published serially in Russkiy Vestnik)
- Joaquim Manuel de Macedo – A Luneta Mágica (The Magical Glasses)
- Hector Malot – Romain Kalbris
- Florence Montgomery – Misunderstood
- Charles Reade – Foul Play
- Capt. Hawley Smart – Breezie Langton
- Hesba Stretton – Alone in London
- Leo Tolstoy – War and Peace
- Anthony Trollope (serial publication concludes and book publication)
  - He Knew He Was Right
  - Phineas Finn (2nd of the Palliser novels)
- Charlotte M. Yonge – The Chaplet of Pearls

=== Children and young people ===
- Louisa May Alcott – Good Wives
- Frances Freeling Broderip
  - Tales of the Toys told by Themselves
  - The Daisy and her Friends: Tales and Stories for Children
- Juliana Horatia Ewing – Mrs. Overtheway's Remembrances
- Jean Ingelow – Mopsa the Fairy
- A. D. T. Whitney – Hitherto

=== Drama ===
- Bjørnstjerne Bjørnson – Sigurd Slembe (Sigurd the Bastard, trilogy, first performed, in Germany)
- François Coppée – Le Passant
- Navalram Pandya – Veermati
- Mendele Mocher Sforim – Di Takse (The Tax, unperformed)
- Alexander Sukhovo-Kobylin – Scenes from the Past

=== Poetry ===
- Henry Kendall – Leaves from Australian Forests

=== Non-fiction ===
- Matthew Arnold – Culture and Anarchy
- P. T. Barnum – Struggles and Triumphs
- Josephine Butler (editor) – Women's Work and Women's Culture
- Warren Felt Evans – The Mental Cure, illustrating the influence of the Mind on the Body
- William Ewart Gladstone – Juventus Mundi: The gods and men of "the heroic" age
- John Stuart Mill – The Subjection of Women
- John Neal — Wandering Recollections of a Somewhat Busy Life: An Autobiography
- Anthony Trollope – On English Prose Fiction as a Rational Amusement
- Mark Twain – The Innocents Abroad
- Richard Wagner – Das Judenthum in der Musik (Jewishness in Music)
- Garnet Wolseley – Soldier’s Pocket-book for Field Service

== Births ==
- January 10 – Rachel Davis Harris, African American librarian (died 1969)
- January 15 – Stanisław Wyspiański, Polish dramatist, poet, painter and architect (died 1907)
- February 8 – Victor Ido, born Hans van de Wall, Dutch East Indian journalist, novelist and playwright (died 1948)
- February 11 – Else Lasker-Schüler, German-born poet, playwright and short story writer (died 1945)
- March 11
  - F. G. Loring, English writer and naval officer (died 1951)
  - Rosa Louise Woodberry, American journalist and educator (died 1932)
- March 14 – Algernon Blackwood, English writer (died 1951)
- May 23 – Olivia Ward Bush-Banks, American poet (died 1944)
- June 10 – Arthur Shearly Cripps, English-born poet, short story writer and Anglican priest in Africa (died 1952)
- July 1 – William Strunk, Jr., American professor of English (died 1946)
- July 8 – William Vaughn Moody, American dramatist and poet (died 1910)
- July 29 – Booth Tarkington, American novelist (died 1946)
- August 10 – Laurence Binyon, English poet and dramatist (died 1943)
- September 6 – Felix Salten, Austrian author and critic (died 1945)
- October 6 – Bo Bergman, Swedish poet (died 1967)
- November 15 – Charlotte Mew, English poet (died 1928)
- November 20 – Zinaida Gippius, Russian writer (died 1945)
- November 22 – André Gide, French writer (died 1951)
- December 22 – Edwin Arlington Robinson, American poet (died 1935)
- December 30 – Stephen Leacock, English-born Canadian humorist and economist (died 1944)

== Deaths ==
- January 20 – Carl Wilhelm Göttling, German classical commentator (born 1793)
- January 28 – Sophie Bolander, Swedish writer (born 1807)
- January 30
  - Frances Catherine Barnard, English writer (born 1796)
  - William Carleton, Irish writer (born 1794)
- February 15 – Ghalib, Indian poet (born 1796)
- February 28 – Alphonse de Lamartine, French poet and politician (born 1790)
- March 31 – David Rees (Y Cynhyrfwr), Nonconformist leader and author (born 1801)
- May 16 – Giovanni Peruzzini, Italian poet, opera librettist, and translator of German literature (born 1815)
- May 18 – Peter Cunningham, British literary scholar and antiquarian (born 1816)
- July 7 – Paul Botten-Hansen, Norwegian librarian, book collector, magazine editor and literary critic (born 1824)
- July 11 – William Jerdan, Scottish-born editor (born 1782)
- July 15 – Carl Friedrich Wilhelm Duncker, German publisher (born 1781)
- July 19 – Victor Aimé Huber, German travel writer and literary historian (born 1800)
- July 22 – Julius Braun, German historian (born 1825)
- August 2 – Thomas Medwin, English poet, biographer and translator (born 1788)
- September 12 – Peter Mark Roget, British lexicographer (born 1779)
- October – John Jones (Talhaiarn), poet (born 1810)
- October 13 – Charles Augustin Sainte-Beuve, French literary critic (b. 1804)
- October 18 – Simon Jenko, Slovene poet (born 1835)
- November 3 – Andreas Kalvos, Greek Romantic poet and dramatist (born 1792)
- November 12 – Gheorghe Asachi, Moldavian polymath (born 1788)

== Notes ==
- Hahn, Daniel (2015). The Oxford Companion to Children's Literature (Second ed.). New York, NY: Oxford University Press. ISBN 9780198715542.
