= Joaquim Manuel de Macedo =

Brazilian writer (1820–1882)

- Photograph of Joaquim Manuel de Macedo in his later life
- Born: 24 June 1820; Itaboraí, Brazil
- Died: 11 April 1882 (aged 61); Rio de Janeiro City, Brazil
- Occupations: novelist, medician, poet, teacher, playwright, journalist
- Spouse: Maria Catarina de Abreu Sodré
- Writing career
- Notable works: A Moreninha; O Moço Loiro; A Luneta Mágica
- Movement: Romanticism

Joaquim Manuel de Macedo (June 24, 1820 – April 11, 1882) was a Brazilian novelist, medical doctor, teacher, poet, playwright and journalist, famous for the romance A Moreninha. He is considered the first Brazilian novelist.

He is the patron of the 20th chair of the Brazilian Academy of Letters.

== Life ==
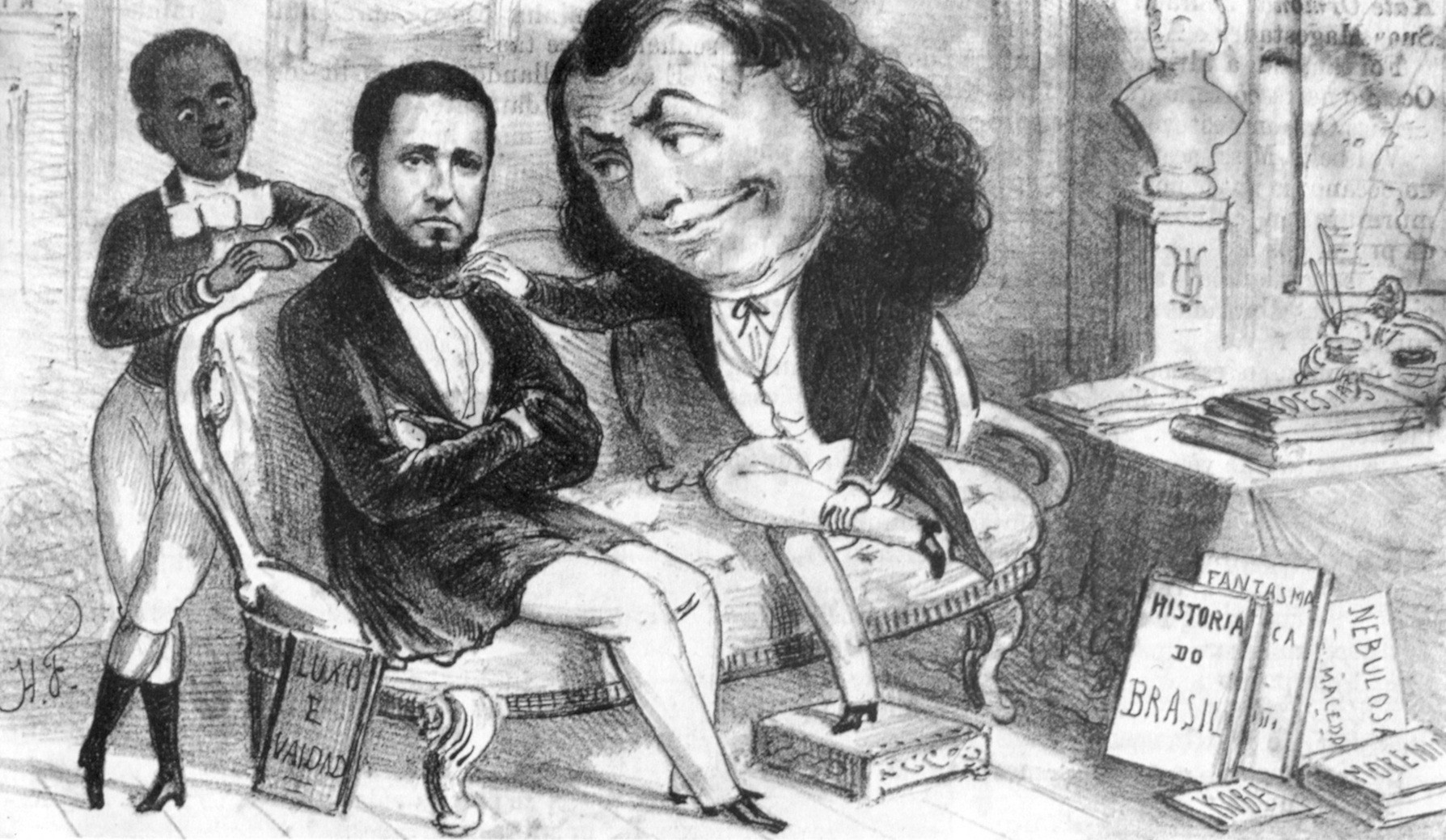
A caricature of Joaquim Manuel de Macedo, who is depicted between a boy and Dr. Semana (Dr. Week), the mascot of Semana Illustrada (Illustrated Week) magazine

Joaquim Manuel de Macedo was born in the city of Itaboraí, in 1820, to Severino de Macedo Carvalho and Benigna Catarina da Conceição. He graduated in Medicine in 1844, and started to practice it in the inlands of Rio. In the same year, he published his romance A Moreninha. In 1849, he founded the magazine Guanabara, along with Manuel de Araújo Porto-Alegre and Gonçalves Dias. In this magazine, many parts of his lengthy poem A Nebulosa were published.

Returning to Rio, he abandoned Medicine and became a teacher of History and Geography at the Colégio Pedro II. He was very linked to the Brazilian Imperial Family, even becoming a tutor for Princess Isabel's children. He was also a provincial deputy and a general deputy, and a member of the Brazilian Historic and Geographic Institute.

During his last years of life, he suffered mental disturbances. These made his health worse and led to his death on April 11, 1882.

He was married to Maria Catarina de Abreu Sodré, a cousin of poet Álvares de Azevedo. Some historians say that the titular character of his novel A Moreninha was based on her.

== Works ==
=== Novels ===
- A Moreninha (1844)
- O Moço Loiro (1845)
- Os Dois Amores (1848)
- Rosa (1849)
- Vicentina (1853)
- O Forasteiro (1855)
- Os Romances da Semana (1861)
- Rio do Quarto (1869)
- A Luneta Mágica (1869)
- As Vítimas-algozes (1869)
- As Mulheres de Mantilha (1870 — 1871)

=== Political satires ===
- A Carteira do Meu Tio (1855)
- Memórias do Sobrinho do Meu Tio (1867 — 1868)

=== Chronicles ===
- Memórias da Rua do Ouvidor
- Um Passeio pela Cidade do Rio de Janeiro
- Labirinto

=== Theater plays ===
==== Tragedies ====
- O Cego (1845)
- Cobé (1849)
- Lusbela (1863)

==== Comedies ====
- O Fantasma Branco (1856)
- O Primo da Califórnia (1858)
- Luxo e Vaidade (1860)
- A Torre em Concurso (1863)
- Cincinato Quebra-Louças (1873)

=== Poetry ===
- A Nebulosa (1857)

=== Biographies ===
- Ano Biográfico Brasileiro (1876)
- Mulheres Célebres (1878)

=== Medical thesis ===
- Considerações sobre a Nostalgia

Preceded by New creation	Brazilian Academy of Letters - Patron of the 20th chair	Succeeded by Salvador de Mendonça (founder)
