= A Moreninha =

A Moreninha may refer to:

- A Moreninha (novel), 1844, by Joaquim Manuel de Macedo
- A Moreninha (TV series), a 1965 Brazilian telenovela
