= A Luneta Mágica =

1869 novel by Joaquim Manuel de Macedo

- Author: Joaquim Manuel de Macedo
- Language: Portuguese
- Genre: Fantasy
- Published: 1869
- Publication place: Brazil

A Luneta Mágica (English: The Magical Glasses) is an 1869 novel written by Brazilian Romantic writer Joaquim Manuel de Macedo. It was serialized in A Semana Ilustrada from March 22 to September 27, 1868 before being published as a standalone book the next year. It is considered to be one of the first Brazilian fantastic novels, comparable to the works of E. T. A. Hoffmann.

== Plot ==
The book tells the story of Simplício, a naive and nearsighted man who fervently desires to regain his sight. After an optometrist is unable to help him, he seeks out an unnamed Armenian magician who can create magical lenses.

To Simplício's delight, the Armenian magician grants him the gift of sight once more. However, he warns Simplício that if he gazes at someone or something for more than three minutes, he will perceive the inherent evil lurking within them. Disregarding the Armenian's cautionary words, Simplício begins to see the malevolent aspects of all things. Branded as crazy and ostracized by society, he becomes a recluse.

Simplício accidentally destroys the lenses that reveal what he perceives as evil, and seeks out the Armenian magician once again. This time, the magician bestows upon Simplício a new pair of lenses that allow him to see the inherent goodness in everything. However, manipulated and deceived by those around him, Simplício experiences numerous misfortunes.

After enduring various trials and tribulations, Simplício eventually acquires the "sanity" lenses, enabling him to perceive the world with clarity and find happiness once more.

== Publication ==
The novel was first published serially in A Semana Ilustrada from March 22 to September 27, 1868, then released as a book in 1869.

== Analysis ==
The literary critic Brito Broca examined the novel's treatment of good and evil in his 1962 essay "Uma fantasia filosófica" (A Philosophical Fantasy). Broca reads the novel as a philosophical allegory about moral perception. Broca contrasts A Luneta Mágica with two other works with similar magical devices, the Brazilian José de Alencar's Ao correr da pena (1855) and the French Frédéric Soulié's Les mémoires du Diable (1837–38); unlike these works, he argues, A Luneta Mágica never allows its protagonist to see the real truth of human beings, only to select from different interpretive lenses.

In 2003, the scholar Suzi Frankl Sperber responded to Broca and argued that A Luneta Mágica has been misunderstood as a simplistic satire, when its central theme is actually intellectual autonomy. Sperber suggests that Macedo was ahead of his time in destabilizing the concepts of identity and moral integrity, connecting the protagonist's need for magical spectacles to judge reality with Kant's concept of enlightenment as emerging from self-imposed immaturity. She argues that the novel's playful plot and allegorical nature may have prevented critics from recognizing the thematic modernity of Macedo's work.
