= Old Years in Plodomasovo =

1869 novella by Nikolai Leskov

Old Times in Plodomasovo
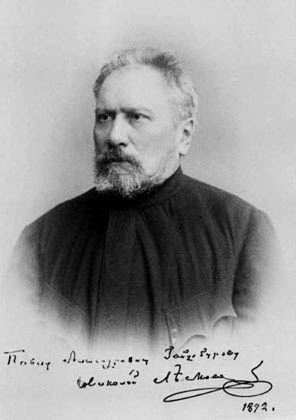
- Nikolai Leskov
- Author: Nikolai Leskov
- Original title: Старые годы в селе Плодомасове
- Language: Russian
- Genre: Romantic chronicles
- Publisher: Syn otechestva
- Publication date: 1869
- Publication place: Russia
- Media type: Print (Paperback & Hardback)

Old Times in Plodomasovo (Ста′рые го′ды в селе′ Плодома′сове) is a novella by Nikolai Leskov which was first published in 1869 and later formed a trilogy, with The Cathedral Clergy (1872) and A Decayed Family (1874).

The publication of the chronicles started in the February, No.2, 1869 issue of The Russian Messenger magazine, when Part 3 of it came out, under the title The Small People of Plodomasovo. Scenes From the Life of Old Russia. Then parts one, Boyarin Nikita Yurievich, and two, Boyarynya Marfa Andreevna, came out in Nos. 6,7 and 8,9 respectively, of the Syn Otechestva magazine.

The Stories by M.Stebnitsky (1869) collection featured the Old Times in Plodomasovo under the title Three Studies, the third one being preceded by the author's commentary: "This one follows a large gap in the Plodomasovo chronicles, for three sketches on old years of Plodomasova and dvoryanin Tuganov's life were not included for some reason. The following Study relates to the period when Marfa Andreevna has already been dead, the story of her later years is being told by her favourite 'midget' Nikolai Afanasievich. In 1872 The Small People of Plodomasovo were published again (with changes made in the text) as part of The Cathedral Clergy (The Russian Messenger, 1872, May), chapters II-IV of the Second Chronicle.

== Background ==
Plodomasovo chronicles were first mentioned in the Literaturnaya Biblioteka magazine's list of acquisitions for the year 1858. Alongside Bozhedomy (Godhouse Dwellers, later to be known as The Cathedral Clergy) here featured the Boyarynya Plodomasova story. Apparently, by the end of 1857 the chronicles have already been in the works. Leskov's original project was more fundamental than the one materialized. In 1871 he wrote: "I wanted to write some kind of a trilogy, first about a grandmother, Plodomasova, then her daughter Tuganova and later grand-daughter." According to the author, the original idea was to show the course of the Russian history of the 18th and 19th centuries, "in its most lightweight, most superficial aspects, by telling life stories of some unimportant, small people who, nevertheless, by their lives to some extent epitomized the history of their time."

The chronicles were based on Leskov's own childhood reminiscences, stories he had heard of ways and lives of different families of the Oryol Governorate, in the 1830s and 1840s. One episode concerning the marriage of 50-year-old Plodomasov and 15-year-old Marpha might have had bearings on his own family history. His aunt Natalya Petrovna Alferyeva in 1824 as a teenager became the wife to 50-year-old landowner Strakhov, who proved to be a jealous and tyrannical husband.

Boyarynya Plodomasova herself had a prototype in a landowner woman Leskov related of in his article called "The Nobility Surfeit". She was Princess Nastassya Massalskaya, who received excellent education in Paris and was loved and respected for her intelligence, noble and independent character. "She had only 500 [serfs] which didn't make her a rich woman, but her house, very well kept, was always open to guests, invited or not. People almost worshipped her and were coming to visit her not for "feasting" but just to "have a bow", express their respect. Neighbours also borrowed books from her vast library which "kept the community very well read," Leskov wrote.
