= O moço loiro =

1845 novel by Joaquim Manuel de Macedo

O moço loiro (transl. The Blonde Boy) is an 1845 novel written by Brazilian author Joaquim Manuel de Macedo.
