= 1873 in literature =

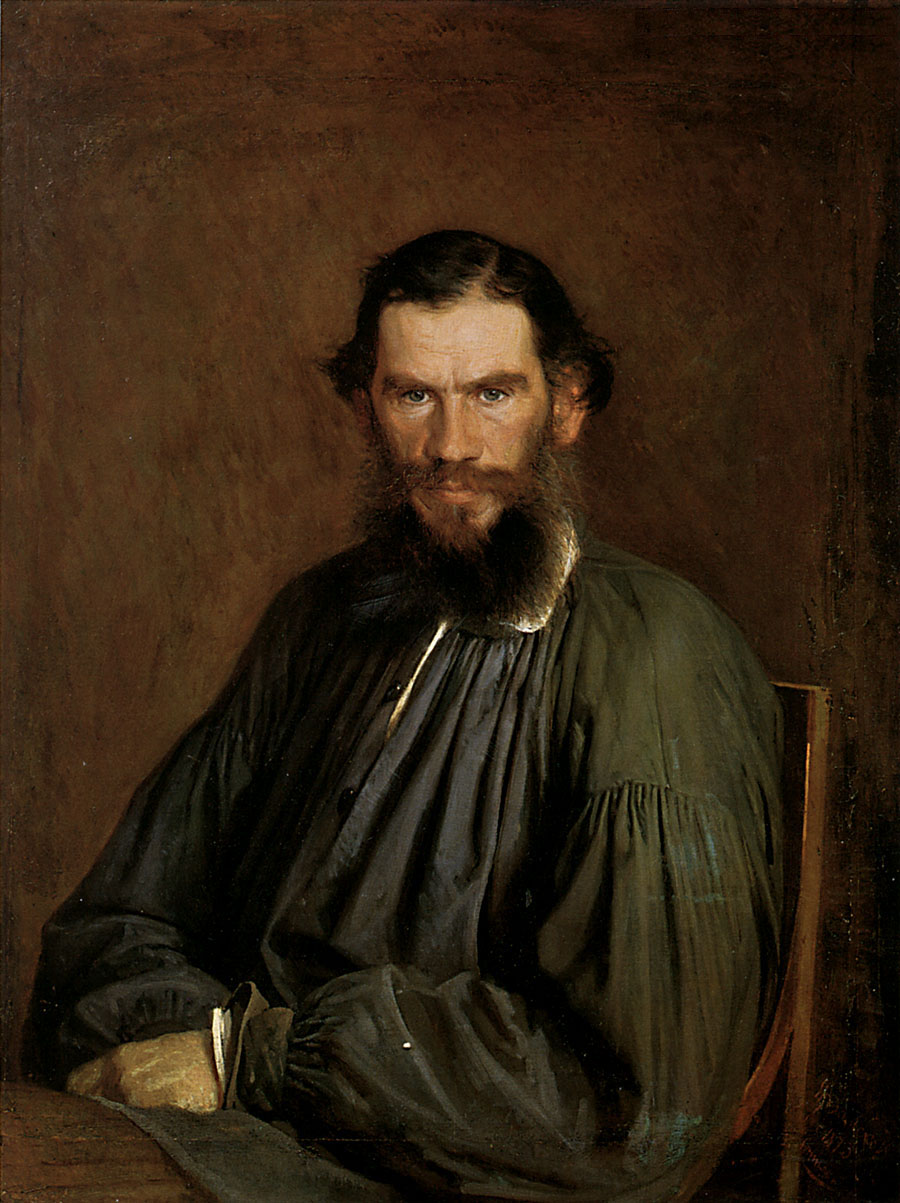
In 1873 Leo Tolstoy begins his novel Anna Karenina, which is serialized in Russkiy Vestnik (Moscow) between 1873 and 1877. This portrait was created in 1873 by Ivan Kramskoi.

This article contains information about the literary events and publications of 1873.

== Events ==
- January 1 – In the United States, Chicago Public Library opens in an old water tank in the aftermath of the Great Chicago Fire of 1871.
- March 3
  - The United States Congress enacts the Comstock Law, making it illegal to send any "obscene, lewd, or lascivious" books through the mail.
  - The first performance of W. S. Gilbert and Gilbert Arthur à Beckett's play The Happy Land at the Royal Court Theatre, London (UK) parodies William Ewart Gladstone, Robert Lowe, and Acton Smee Ayrton, respectively the prime minister, Chancellor of the Exchequer, and First Commissioner of Works.
- March 10 – The first Azerbaijani play The Adventure of a Miser (The Adventures of the Vizier of the Khan of Lenkaran) by Mirza Fatali Akhundov is performed by Hasan bey Zardabi and dramatist Najaf bey Vazirov.
- March 18 – Leo Tolstoy begins his novel Anna Karenina, which is serialized in Russkiy Vestnik (Moscow) between 1873 and 1877.
- June 16 – Karl Marx inscribes a copy of his treatise Das Kapital to Charles Darwin "on the part of his sincere admirer" but Darwin never finishes reading it.
- July – Thomas Hardy's novel A Pair of Blue Eyes completes its serialization in Tinsley's Magazine (begun September 1872) and appears in book format in London. Although this is Hardy's third novel, it is the first to bear his name on publication in the U.S.
- July 10 – Paul Verlaine shoots and wounds Arthur Rimbaud in Brussels.
- November – The children's periodical St. Nicholas Magazine begins publication by Scribner and Company in New York under the editorship of Mary Mapes Dodge.
- December 18 – Louisa May Alcott's family satire "Transcendental Wild Oats" is published in the newspaper The Independent.
- unknown dates
  - Serialisation of the novel Night and Morning (original author not acknowledged, but in fact by Edward Bulwer-Lytton, 1841) as Xinxi xiantan by "Lishao Jushi" (probably Jiang Qizhang) begins in the Shanghai monthly Yinghuan Suoji, the first secular fiction translated from English into Chinese.
  - Charles M. Barnes opens his book printing business in Wheaton, Illinois, United States; it is a forerunner of publisher Barnes & Noble.
  - In Berlin, the Romanian poet Mihai Eminescu is known to be working on the verse fairy tale "Girl in the Garden of Gold" (Fata-n grădina de aur). He will revisit the text regularly during the next decade, eventually producing his masterpiece Luceafărul (published April 1883).
  - Bertha Kinsky becomes governess to the Suttner family.

== New books ==
=== Fiction ===
- Louisa May Alcott – Work: A Story of Experience
- Hortense Allart – Les Enchantements de Prudence avec George Sand
- Ambrose Bierce – The Fiend's Delight
- Mary Elizabeth Braddon – Publicans and Sinners
- Rhoda Broughton
  - Nancy
  - Tales for Christmas Eve
- Bankim Chatterjee – The Poison Tree
- Wilkie Collins
  - Miss or Mrs.?
  - The New Magdalen
- Sami Frashëri – Ta'aşşûk-ı Tal'at ve Fitnât (The Love Between Talat and Fitnat)
- Émile Gaboriau – La Corde au cou
- Thomas Hardy – A Pair of Blue Eyes
- William Dean Howells – A Chance Acquaintance
- Nikolai Leskov – The Enchanted Wanderer («Очарованный странник», novella serialized in Russkiy Mir)
- George MacDonald – The History of Gutta-Percha Willie, the Working Genius
- Benito Pérez Galdós – Trafalgar (first of his Episodios Nacionales)
- Anne Thackeray Ritchie – Old Kensington
- Karolina Světlá – Nemodlenec
- Anthony Trollope – Phineas Redux (serialization)
- Mark Twain (with Charles Warner) – The Gilded Age: A Tale of Today
- Jules Verne – Around the World in Eighty Days (Le Tour du monde en quatre-vingts jours, book publication and first English translation)
- Émile Zola – Le Ventre de Paris

=== Drama ===
- W. S. Gilbert – The Realm of Joy
- Henrik Ibsen
  - Emperor and Galilean (first published)
  - Love's Comedy (first performed)
- Adolphe L'Arronge – My Leopold
- Émile Zola – Thérèse Raquin (adaptation by author)

=== Poetry ===
- Paul Bourget – Au bord de la mer
- Robert Browning – Red Cotton Night-Cap Country
- Tristan Corbière – only published work included in Les Amours Jaunes
- Edmund Gosse – On Viol and Flute
- Arthur Rimbaud – Une Saison en Enfer

=== Non-fiction ===
- Samuel Butler – The Fair Haven
- Alexandre Dumas (posthumous) – Grand Dictionnaire de cuisine
- Émile Littré – Dictionnaire de la langue française
- Walter Pater – Studies in the History of the Renaissance
- Leslie Stephen – Essays on Free Thinking and Plain Speaking
- Charlotte Mary Yonge – Life of John Coleridge Patteson

== Births ==
- January 1 – Mariano Azuela, Mexican writer (died 1952)
- January 7 – Charles Péguy, French poet and essayist (killed in action 1914)
- January 9 – Hayim Nahman Bialik, Russian-born Hebrew-language poet (died 1934)
- January 20 – Johannes V. Jensen, Danish writer and Nobel Prize winner (died 1950)
- January 28 – Colette (Sidonie-Gabrielle Colette), French novelist (died 1954)
- February 22 – Carrie Langston Hughes, African-American writer and actress (died 1938)
- February 23 (O. S. February 10) – Haralamb Lecca, Romanian dramatist, poet and translator (died 1920)
- March 10 – Jakob Wassermann, German novelist (died 1934)
- March 20 – Constantin Banu, Romanian politician, journalist, cultural promoter and aphorist (died 1940)
- Before March 29 (date of baptism) – Peig Sayers (Máiréad Sayers), Irish seanchaí (traditional storyteller) (died 1958)
- April 22 – Ellen Glasgow, American novelist (died 1945)
- April 25 – Howard R. Garis, American children's fiction writer (died 1962)
- May 17 – Henri Barbusse, French novelist (died 1935)
- June 8 – José Martínez Ruiz (Azorín), Spanish novelist (died 1967)
- June 16 – Lady Ottoline Morrell (Ottoline Cavendish-Bentinck), English patron of the arts (died 1938)
- July 22 – James Cousins, Irish writer (died 1956)
- August 13 – Dora Adele Shoemaker, American poet and playwright (died 1962)
- September 8 – Alfred Jarry, French dramatist (died 1907)
- October 1 – Ludovic Dauș, Romanian novelist and dramatist (died 1954)
- October 10 – George Cabot Lodge, American poet (died 1909)
- November 13 – Oliver Onions (George Oliver), English novelist and ghost story writer (died 1961)
- December 3 – Ilie Bărbulescu, Romanian linguist and journalist (died 1945)
- December 7 – Willa Cather, American novelist (died 1947)
- December 17 – Ford Madox Ford, English novelist (died 1939)
- December 29 – Ovid Densusianu, Romanian poet, philologist and journalist (died 1938)

== Deaths ==
- January 9 – Sigurd Abel, German historian (born 1837)
- January 10 – Francesco Dall'Ongaro, Italian poet and dramatist (born 1808)
- January 16 – Ulrika von Strussenfelt, Swedish novelist (born 1801)
- January 18 – Edward Bulwer-Lytton, English novelist and playwright (born 1803)
- February 1 – Gertrudis Gómez de Avellaneda, Cuban-born novelist (born 1814)
- February 7 – Sheridan Le Fanu, Irish writer (born 1814)
- February 24 – Spiridon Trikoupis, Greek author and orator (born 1788)
- May 8 – John Stuart Mill, English philosopher (born 1806)
- May 22 – Alessandro Manzoni, Italian poet and novelist (born 1785)
- May 27 – Pierre-Antoine Lebrun, French poet (born 1785)
- July 13 – Caroline Clive, English poet and author, dies in fire (born 1801)
- August 15 – Edward Meredith Cope, English classicist (born 1818)
- September 25 – Francesco Domenico Guerrazzi, Italian novelist (born 1804)
- September 26 – Julius Roerich Benedix, German dramatist (born 1811)
- September 28 – Émile Gaboriau, French crime novelist (born 1832)
- October 4 – Margaret Gatty, English children's author (born 1809)
- November 6 – Manuel Bretón de los Herreros, Spanish playwright (born 1796)
- Unknown date – Harriet Ward, English non-fiction and fiction writer (born 1808)
