= Amelie von Strussenfelt =

Constantina Carolina Amalia "Amelie" von Strussenfelt (1803–1847), was a Swedish writer and poet.

== Biographyer ==
Amelie von Strussenfelt was the daughter of the courtier and nobleman Michael von Strussenfelt and Fredrika Beata Lindencrona, and the sister of the writer Ulrika von Strussenfelt. Her mother died in childbirth in 1803 and her father left the country after his remarriage not long after, and she was placed in the care of her paternal grandparents, while her sister was placed in the care of her maternal grandparents. The sisters were to have a bad relationship, and her sister Ulrika placed the blame for her late development as a writer on the fact that her sister Amelie had always been considered the more gifted one. She never married, and like her sister, she worked as a governess (from 1831) and eventually set up a school (1845), at that point the most common and almost only socially acceptable profession for an upper-class woman in need of supporting herself.

Amelie von Strussenfelt debuted as a poet in 1828, and as a novelist in 1829.

In her novel Qvinnan utan förmyndare (Woman without Guardian) from 1841, she participated in the debate about the minority of adult unmarried women, who were legally under the guardianship of their closest male relative from a reformist's viewpoint: she was met with a conservative reply by the novel Qvinnan med förmyndare (Woman with Guardian) by Sophie Bolander.

== Selected works ==
- "Constance Soligny", 1829
- "Alarik eller Vikingarne", 1830
- "Hilma",
- "Sigfrid Thuresson Ryning", 1831
- "Andelunden",
- "Dikter",
- "Qvinnan utan förmyndare" (1–2, 1841)
