= Work: A Story of Experience =

1873 novel by Louisa May Alcott

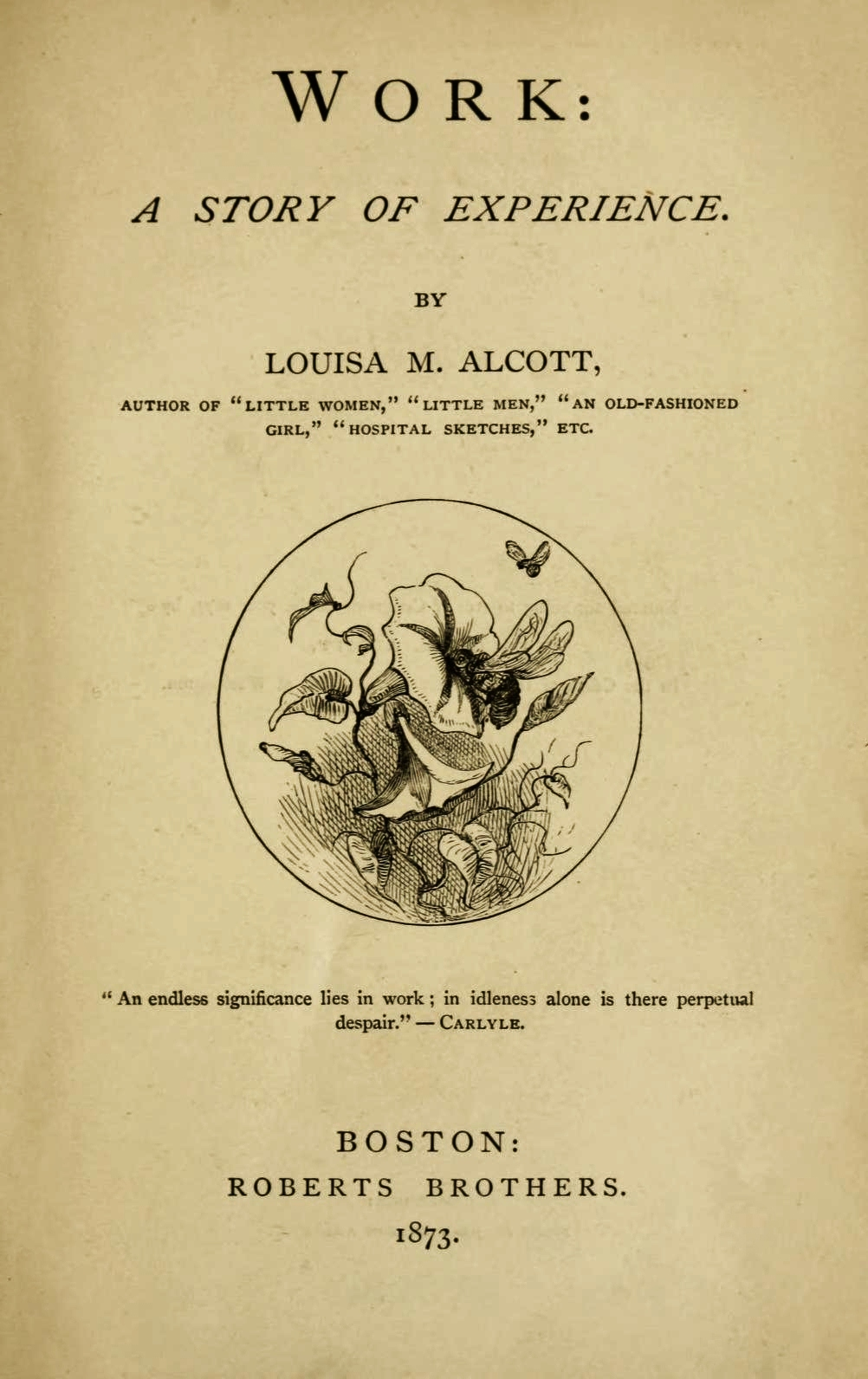
- First edition title page
- Author: Louisa May Alcott
- Language: English
- Genre: Semi-autobiographical novel
- Publisher: Roberts Brothers
- Publication date: 1873
- Publication place: Boston, United States
- Media type: Print (Hardback)

Work: A Story of Experience, originally serialized and first published in book form in 1873, is a semi-autobiographical novel by Louisa May Alcott, the author of Little Women. It is set in the times before and after the American Civil War. The protagonist, Christie Devon, leaves her home to make a living on her own. She goes from job to job, eventually marries, and becomes a social activist when her husband dies. Alcott wrote the book over the course of several years and based it in part on her own experiences as a young woman in the workforce. Following publication, contemporary critical reviews were mixed, with some reviewers praising the plot's execution and others criticizing it. The novel's themes include women's participation in the workforce, domesticity and equality, personal independence, social reform, and mental health.

== Background and publication history ==
Originally entitling it Success, Alcott wrote Work: A Story of Experience over the span of several years. She originally began the novel when she was eighteen years old. She picked it up again as a twenty-eight-year-old in January 1861, but took a break to nurse her ill mother. She continued Work in 1863 during her recovery following a bout of typhoid fever contracted during her service as a nurse in the American Civil War. She recommenced the novel in 1872 when in November Henry Ward Beecher of The Christian Union requested a serialized novel. Alcott agreed, needing the money after having just paid for her father to go on a speaking tour. When she began writing, Alcott fell into what she called a "vortex", explaining that she "Can't work slowly; the thing possesses me, and I must obey till it's done." Her writing was interrupted by various circumstances, including the Great Boston Fire of 1872. Along with others, Alcott evacuated the city. In January she was able to continue writing for hours a day, preparing three copies of the final draft to send to The Christian Union as well as her American and British book publishers. She wrote on impression paper and pressed so hard that her thumb was paralyzed for a time and damaged for the rest of her life; when this happened, she wrote with her other hand.

In writing the book Alcott drew upon "The Public Function of Woman" by Theodore Parker, in which he argued that the innovations accompanying industrialism would lighten a woman's domestic load, allowing her to work for money if she wished. Alcott used the sermon to model the protagonist Christie's experiences in the workforce. Alcott identified Parker as the model for the character Reverend Power. Additionally, she based the characters David Sterling on Henry David Thoreau and Hepsey Johnson on Harriet Tubman, both of whom she personally knew. The protagonist, Christie, has various jobs which reflect jobs Alcott took as a young woman during her struggle to find employment following the death of her sister Elizabeth in 1858. Alcott biographer Ruth K. MacDonald suggests that the name Christie Devon may have been Alcott's stage name during a stint with the Boston Theatre Company, as the name appears in a list of the participants.

Upon the novel's completion in February 1873, Alcott dedicated it with the following inscription: "To my mother, whose life has been a long labor of love." Alcott felt unsatisfied with the finished product because she felt that the interruptions weakened the novel's quality. The novel was serialized in The Christian Union from 1872–1873 and published in book form in June 1873 by Roberts Brothers. There were 15,000 pre-orders of the book, which set back the date of publication. Solomon Eytinge drew illustrations for the book version. Alcott donated some of the proceeds from sales to support the poor. In 1875 Sampson Low published Beginning Again. Being a Continuation of Work, which consists of the last eleven chapters of the Roberts Brothers edition.

== Plot ==
Twenty-one-year-old orphan Christie Devon decides to leave her aunt and uncle to support herself financially and travels to the city, where she becomes a housekeeper. While there, she befriends the cook, Hepsey Johnson, who is a former slave, and teaches her how to read and count so she can free her family. After a year, Christie loses her job after a fire-related accident. Christie befriends two actresses who help Christie become an actress. Three years later, an accident at the theater injures Christie and she decides to quit. Following her recovery, she becomes a governess for the Saltonstall family. Mrs. Saltonstall's brother, Philip Fletcher, falls in love with Christie. When he proposes, she refuses because he does not see her as an equal. Because she refused the proposal, Christie decides she can no longer work for the Saltonstalls. Instead, she becomes the companion of Helen Carrol, an invalid. Christie interests Helen, and after several months, Helen's health improves. Helen becomes anxious after finding out that her youngest sister Bella has a beau. Helen explains to Christie that insanity runs in the family and she is worried that Bella, who does not know about it, will pass it on to her children. Helen reveals her own insanity and later commits suicide. Bella finds out about the hereditary insanity, deciding not to marry.

Christie leaves the Carrols and becomes a seamstress, meeting another seamstress, Rachel. When their employer finds out that Rachel is a fallen woman, Rachel is fired. Christie pleads on Rachel's behalf and is also fired. Christie offers Rachel a home, but she is afraid of ruining Christie's reputation and leaves. Christie finds another sewing job, becomes ill, falls into debt, and is about to lose her room and board. As she contemplates suicide, Rachel, who now helps destitute women, finds her and refers her to Cynthy Wilkins, who gives her a temporary home. Cynthy invites Christie to listen to Reverend Power. Rev. Power recommends Christie to Mrs. Sterling, a widowed Quaker woman in the country. Mrs. Sterling has a son, David, who lives with her and is a florist; David is sorrowful because he believes his sister died long ago. When Christie arrives, she becomes the Sterlings' house assistant. Christie notices that, though ostensibly cheerful, David is unhappy. He confesses to Christie that he is unsatisfied with a quiet life but stays for his mother's sake. After seeing this side of David, Christie falls in love with him. She attempts to stifle her romantic feelings because he sees her as a friend, but they remain.

The Sterlings' previous assistant, Kitty, arrives to escape an engagement. Kitty flirts with David, and Christie grows jealous when she suspects that David is developing romantic feelings for Kitty. Christie decides to leave and becomes Rev. Power's secretary. Rev. Power regularly hosts gatherings at his house, which both Christie and David attend. One night Philip attends and Christie introduces him to David. Afterward, Philip attends regularly while David stops coming. Though Christie is not in love with Philip, she considers marrying him for financial security. When Christie asks Cynthy for advice, she tells Christie to marry for love, not money. Christie declines Philip's second proposal. David visits Christie and shares that he has discovered his sister Letty is alive, explaining that Letty and Rachel are the same person. He explains that he forbade her from returning home after she eloped, since then regretting it and thinking she was dead. He asks Christie to return, confessing his love for her and his jealousy of Philip. She agrees, and they return together.

Shortly after, the American Civil War begins. A year later, David enlists and Christie decides to serve as a nurse. Two months later, David is called to duty and marries Christie before leaving. Though Christie is working in the hospital and David is in the camp, they visit each other frequently. Several months through their service, David is fatally wounded while liberating a slave woman. Christie stays with him until he dies, then returns home and prepares to give birth to their baby. Years later, Bella Carrol visits and asks for employment advice. Christie, who still runs David's greenhouse and advocates for working-class women, asks Bella to create a group that discusses social reform. Christie and several women commit to supporting each other in their work.

== Reception ==
Alcott's Work: A Story of Experience received a mix of positive and negative critical reviews. While the Boston Daily Advertiser praised Alcott's depiction of the working class, the Daily Evening Traveller proclaimed that it was "likely to be a rival" in popularity with Alcott's other novels. Boston's The Evening Post felt that it lacked the cheerfulness of her other works and criticized its "sudden 'ups and downs'". The Worcester Evening Gazette opined that "the finished book is one which women love, and men find mildly interesting, if no more." The Springfield Daily Republican wrote that the "teachings [were] sound and attractive" but felt it would have been a better novel if there was more tragedy and wrongdoing among the characters. The Springfield Daily Union considered the plot haphazard and stated that the novel was likely to prevent women from working, though it saw the book as a "plea for independence for woman through work". The Ladies' Repository concluded that serializing the novel led to its episodic style. In speaking of the episodic structure, Appletons' Journal wrote that the book was "a mosaic of good things, badly put together".

Mary Thacher of Old and New praised the "absences of the current slang-phrases" that show up in Alcott's other works. Thacher also expressed a dislike for the chapter about Helen Carrol, calling it "melodramatic" with a "morbid tinge". The Saturday Review of Politics, Literature, Science, and Art called Helen's suicide a "horrible climax" and claimed that this chapter was not "good art", stating that only writers similar to Edgar Allan Poe should write things like it. In its review, The Literary World commended the novel's dialogue, calling it the best found in Alcott's works; it also stated that the book would "come very near doing positive good". Eclectic Magazine opined that "it is no more 'a story of experience' than Utopia is a sketch of existing social conditions" and declared that Alcott was better at writing children's books. Harper's New Monthly Magazine criticized the plot design while claiming that readers would be inspired by the story. The Lakeside Monthly felt there was an "undeniable insufficiency of imagination, thought, and sentiment" and argued that Philip Fletcher undergoes more character development than David Sterling does. The Nation was also critical of the novel's lack of imagination, declaring that it was "nothing as a work of art".

When the Alcotts hired a new housekeeper following the novel's publication, they found out that she had read Work and decided to follow Christie's example.

== Themes and analysis ==
=== Experience in the workforce ===
Work: A Story of Experience explores women's experiences with the workforce in the mid-to-late 19th century. Jelena Šesnić, an English professor at the University of Zagreb, explains that Alcott examines the relationship between the domestic space, the workforce, and femininity, combining the public and private spheres for her female characters. Though women in the 19th century were generally expected to stay within the private sphere while the public sphere was reserved for men, the narrative explores the effect female traits have on society, according to Tara Fitzpatrick. She argues that Work pushes against the social expectations of separate spheres for men and women but eventually submits to them. Šesnić suggests that the novel reflects the transcendentalist perception that a person has a life's work. In the narrative, work leads to rewards such as platonic and romantic love, self-reliance, and individuality, making work itself a reward.

The novel examines the social and personal effects of female participation in the workforce. It was originally entitled Success but was later changed to Work; Adams argues that this change reflects active participation rather than achievement in the workforce. In the transcendental movement, work was viewed as a means of gaining experience. The novel indicates that a woman undergoes self-development as she works various jobs. Christie keeps this in mind as she teaches women that different jobs open new opportunities. Work is portrayed as generally redemptive; it is when she is out of work that Christie contemplates suicide. According to author and literary analyst Sylvia Jenkins Cook, the narrative "explores the role work plays in women's lives in a more expansive social and intellectual context than that of any previous novel of the century." California Polytechnic State University English professors Kathleen Lant and Angela M. Estes suggest that it does not outline the life of a working woman but rather that it proposes a possible future for the working woman. It addresses middle-class women who work out of both desire and need. In the 1870s, it was unconventional to view a working woman as socially acceptable, says Sarah Lahey. Christie, who is a "self-identified working woman", works to earn money and gain a sense of fulfillment.

Literary critics have identified tensions in the novel that exist between different social classes in the workforce. Christie believes that women's jobs should align with their social status; her advice to Bella is to begin social reform in the upper class to which she belongs. Hendel claims that this encourages "class separation" within the workforce. Christie herself avoids taking factory jobs because she feels it would be below her social class of gentlewoman, and English professor Carolyn Maibor argues that "ethnic prejudice" comes out when Christie refuses to work with Irish women. Kathryn Dolan, assistant English professor at Missouri University of Science and Technology claims that Alcott's handling of immigrants, class differences, and race is "somewhat problematic". Professor and author Susan K. Harris points out that Alcott does not illustrate interactions between working women and working men. However, the book outlines what Alcott saw as risks of labor, such as struggles with physical and mental health. As a seamstress, Christie experiences a break in her mental and physical health because she overworks and experiences poor working conditions. She also struggles socially. Labor for wages is portrayed as less beneficial than working for "self-improvement".

=== Domesticity and equality ===
Šesnić argues that Work does not entirely refute domesticity. Instead, Šesnić argues that the novel suggests a "revision" for domesticity rather than a dissolution. Fitzpatrick argues that Alcott reshapes the domestic sphere in the novel. In the narrative, domestic skills benefit a larger sphere than the domestic space. Dolan claims the book concludes that domesticity is the most satisfactory vocation for women in conjunction with participation in public activities, such as voting. The last half of the novel focuses on Christie's search for a place within a domestic sphere, which establishes her as "both nurturer and provider". The plot takes its domestic turn when Christie realizes the workforce is competitive. She takes on domestic work in the Wilkins household after Rachel rescues her from committing suicide. Christie's domestic skills further aid her when she works for the Sterlings as a household assistant. In the Sterling household, "domestic labor [is] performed equally by men and women", leading to equality in Christie's relationship with David. Christie feels unsatisfied with domestic work until she falls in love with David. During her relationship with David, Christie decides she wants to live and work within a domestic sphere. Because of her domestic focus during their relationship, she does not encounter a need to balance employment and domesticity. In Strickland's view, the novel calls for equality in marriage. The emphasis on their equal partnership, says Strickland, is furthered when they both marry in their military uniforms. Christie deems her military service worthwhile and feels free "from the constraints of either the traditional family home or economic necessity."

=== Struggle for independence ===
According to Jean Fagan Yellin, Work: A Story of Experience explores whether or not women could "live an independent life in America". Katherine Adams explains that, "rather than reading...[it] for feminism,...we can read it as feminists", while Sarah Elbert argues that it outlines Alcott's first-wave feminism. According to Elbert, it compiles "the broad set of beliefs encompassing family, education, suffrage, labor and the moral reform of social life that defined feminist ideology in the nineteenth century." Outlining women's challenges while finding new roles in society, the novel discusses female independence—an aberration from "early women's didactic novels". According to literary analysts, the novel argues against female dependency and for more female participation in society. Erin Hendel, a technical writer at Rocky Mountain Institute who holds a doctorate degree in English, suggests that, in her desire to join the workforce, Christie demonstrates Ralph Waldo Emerson's belief that people who work gain "self-knowledge". Until her search for independence, Christie has experienced little outside the domestic sphere. When Christie decides to leave her aunt and uncle, she announces, "There is going to be a new Declaration of Independence." Her announcement reflects the Declaration of Sentiments from the Seneca Falls Convention. Christie leaves home because she wants "individualism; she disavows patriarchy, marriage, gender-conformity, and capitalism." Through her search for independence, Christie learns about "herself and the world", reflecting Emerson's conception that people can become self-reliant.

The jobs that Christie takes are some of the only ones available to women at the time. That Christie's skills are largely based on domesticity limits what jobs she is able to take because her education does not reflect what employers want. At first, she is only able to take jobs in domestic service, which leads her to feel degraded. After learning about Hepsey Johnson's experience with slavery, Christie decides to view her work differently. With Hepsey's help, she is able to "preserve a sense of identity even when that identity is continually denied" by her employers. Hepsey gains independence in the workforce because she is able to earn money to free her enslaved family members. Throughout her first few jobs, Christie explores different female roles and also mimics behavior she observes in wealthy women. According to author Katherine Adams, during her time as an actress Christie examines her own ideas about women in society through her role as an Amazon queen. Amazons shunned men except for propagation purposes. Christie notices that the other actresses are afraid of the stage manager, who watches them with a male gaze. Christie expects to gain female independence as an actress but realizes she is in bondage to her acting. Discussing later events in the narrative, Alcott scholar Ruth K. MacDonald explains that while it is difficult for both Christie and Rachel to become independent, it is harder for Rachel because she is a fallen woman. Elbert argues that Christie is unable to gain independence on her own but is able to gain it with the help of other people.

Carolyn Maibor suggests that, in Alcott's view, "self-reliance, in both a philosophical and a financial sense, is always preferable to any kind of dependency." Throughout the book, women who are married and financially stable are portrayed as unproductive women who are subject to their husbands. As an alternative to employment, Christie considers marrying Philip Fletcher for his money. When she decides that marriage to him would stifle her independence, she refuses his proposal. For her, independence is gained by working for money. Helen Carrol's mother married Mr. Carrol while knowing insanity ran in his family because she desired financial and social stability. Harris argues that Mrs. Carrol's perspective on her marriage smothers her individuality. Helen's individuality is also affected by her mother's marriage because she feels that she cannot marry so as to not pass on the gene.

=== Social reform ===
In Elbert's perspective, the novel's social reform for women includes education, increased job opportunities, and female participation in the public sphere. Yellin concludes that its discussions on slavery are less "forceful" than its discussions on gender equality. Author Charles Strickland argues that it addresses gender, class, and racial barriers to employment. Characters such as Cynthy Wilkins, Rev. Power, and David Sterling belong to a group of social reformers. Strickland explains that, at the time Alcott wrote the book, social reform groups were becoming common. Those who help Christie after her period of mental illness run untraditional homes where one gender is not considered superior to the other. In their relationship, Christie and David seek to adopt each other's gender traits in an effort to create a cooperative partnership. Christie's desire is for a partnership based on male-female equality.

David tries to make restitution for shunning his sister by helping destitute women. Because of this, Hollins University English professor Elizabeth Lennox Keyser says, David has "nurturing qualities" and lacks "traditional male traits like ambition". David imitates traditionally female characteristics because he believes they are desirable. In the war, Christie and David are able to use their domestic or traditionally feminine traits, such as "self-sacrifice", to aid the nation. According to Keyser, David's death by saving a slave woman stems from his conviction that women are valuable to society. As he dies, he asks Christie to perpetuate his social reform. Christie does, through which Alcott establishes a socially influential woman in Christie. Christie moves into the public sphere as she advocates for working women. Working in social reform allows her to discover her individuality while preserving her feminine traits. Though she wants to be a gentlewoman early in the novel, by the end she realizes she finds more satisfaction in social reform than in fine society. Strickland points out that the details of Christie's social reform are "vague". Her social reform consists of aiding women who have struggled in the workforce, and she seeks to help them based on her own struggles. Specifically, she mediates between middle-class female philanthropists and lower-class working women because they have difficulty understanding each other's perspectives. Tara Fitzpatrick suggests that, through this, the book calls for a resolution of class barriers. Mediating between these women indicates that Christie works with domestic and employment concerns, says Šesnić. Christie also asks Bella Carrol to encourage equality between men and women within her own social class.

==== Female collaboration ====
As a social reformer, Christie creates a community of working women. These working women collaborate to support each other in their search for and struggles with employment. Kornacki explains that Christie's social reform efforts are similar to Margaret Fuller's methods. In her Boston Conversations directed toward women, Fuller discussed "education, self-reliance, vocation, and sorority." Fuller sought to decrease female rivalry and believed that women should come together in their search for self-reliance. Christie creates a sorority of working women of different races, social classes, and ages. Her group, made possible through David's death, parallels the New England Woman's Club, to which Alcott belonged. Fuller also discussed a "female messiah" in her piece Woman in the Nineteenth Century. Alcott creates this in Christie, who has a "ministry to American women", say Lant and Estes. She begins her "redemption" of women when she befriends Rachel. When she is fired, Rachel calls for social reform in which fallen women are not rejected by their communities; Christie answers this call by pleading for Rachel; her plea later leads to the formation of her female community. In turn, Rachel redeems Christie when she contemplates suicide. Christie builds her female community over the course of the novel, Hepsey, Cynthy, and Mrs. Sterling being among the first members. Christie's daughter Ruth joins Christie's community, which Cook says indicates the next generation's involvement in women's rights. Yellin suggests that in the middle of the book Christie denies herself of the female support she desires because she limits her work options based on class. Yellin further states that Christie's lack of experience as an industrial factory worker would make it difficult for her to mediate between working-class and middle-class women due to a lack of knowledge in that area of labor.

=== Mental health ===
Keyser suggests that Helen Carrol's poor mental condition is worsened by her family's secrecy and limited sympathy. In turn, Helen grows to hate herself for her mental illness. After Helen's suicide, Christie seeks to prevent Bella from going insane and committing suicide by encouraging Mrs. Carrol to be open about Helen's condition with her. Through the years, Bella is able to maintain her sanity as well as that of her brother by dedicating her time to him. Keyser argues that Bella's story demonstrates a redemption that comes from sharing stories of personal difficulty. Later, Christie experiences her own struggle with mental health after losing her sewing job. She lacks a female support system, which Keyser suggests factors into her suicide contemplation. Author and English professor Glenn Hendler analyzes Christie's struggle, arguing that she experiences a "crisis" of identity when she considers suicide, projecting herself onto an oar floating in the river below. As a young woman Alcott talked herself out of suicide, while Christie is rescued by Rachel. Yellin explains that other female protagonists in 19th-century literature who sought individuality typically committed suicide. After her mental and physical health improve, Christie grows less ambitious and turns to "hero-worship", setting up Rev. Power and David Sterling as her heroes.

== Works cited ==
- Adams, Katherine (2016). "Feminist Alcott?". In Eiselein, Gregory; Phillips, Anne K. (eds.). Critical Insights: Louisa May Alcott. Ipswich, MA, USA: Salem Press. ISBN 978-1-61925-521-0.
- Alcott, Louisa May (1873). Work: A Story of Experience. Roberts Brothers.
- Alcott, Louisa May (1875). Beginning Again. Being a Continuation of Work: A Story of Experience. Sampson Low.
- Cheney, Edna Dow (2010). Louisa May Alcott: Her Life, Letters, and Journals. Carlisle, Massachusetts, USA: Applewood Books. ISBN 978-1-4290-4460-8.
- Clark, Beverly Lyon (2004). Louisa May Alcott: The Contemporary Reviews. Cambridge University Press. ISBN 978-0521827805.
- Cook, Sylvia Jenkins (2008). Working Women, Literary Ladies: The Industrial Revolution and Female Aspiration. Oxford University Press. ISBN 978-0-19-532780-9 – via Internet Archive.
- Delamar, Gloria T. (1990). Louisa May Alcott and "Little Women": Biography, Critique, Publications, Poems, Songs and Contemporary Relevance. Jefferson, NC, USA: McFarland. ISBN 0-89950-421-3.
- Dolan, Kathryn Cornell (2015). "Her Daily Bread: Food and Labor in Louisa May Alcott". American Literary Realism. 48 (1): 40–57. doi:10.5406/amerlitereal.48.1.0040. ISSN 1540-3084. JSTOR 10.5406/amerlitereal.48.1.0040.
- Elbert, Sarah (1987). A Hunger for Home: Louisa May Alcott's Place in American Culture. Rutgers University Press. ISBN 0-8135-1199-2.
- Fitzpatrick, Tara (1993). "Love's Labor's Reward: The Sentimental Economy of Louisa May Alcott's "Work"". NWSA Journal. 5 (1): 28–44. ISSN 1040-0656. JSTOR 4316238.
- Gronewold, Laura; Daly-Galeano, Marlowe. "The Work is Never Done: Women's Collaboration in the Workplace from Louisa May Alcott to Contemporary Chick-Lit – Reconstruction".
- Harris, Susan K. (1992). 19th-century American Women's Novels: Interpretive Strategies. Cambridge University Press. ISBN 978-0-521-38288-5 – via Internet Archive.
- Hendel, Erin (2011). "'Work and Wait': Louisa May Alcott's Female Artists". In Mower, Christine Leiren; Weil, Susanne (eds.). Women and Work: The Labors of Self-Fashioning. Cambridge Scholars Publishing. ISBN 978-1-4438-2463-7 – via Internet Archive.
- Hendler, Glenn (1991). "The Limits of Sympathy: Louisa May Alcott and the Sentimental Novel". American Literary History. 3 (4): 685–706. ISSN 0896-7148. JSTOR 489880.
- Keyser, Elizabeth Lennox (1993). Whispers in the Dark: The Fiction of Louisa May Alcott. University of Tennessee Press. ISBN 978-0-87049-906-7.
- Kornacki, Katie (2016). ""A Loving League of Sisters": The Legacy of Margaret Fuller's Boston Conversations in Alcott's Work". In Eiselein, Gregory; Phillips, Anne K. (eds.). Critical Insights: Louisa May Alcott. Ipswich, MA, USA: Salem Press. ISBN 978-1-61925-521-0.
- Lahey, Sarah T. (2012). "Honeybees and Discontented Workers: A Critique of Labor in Louisa May Alcott". American Literary Realism. 44 (2): 133–156. doi:10.5406/amerlitereal.44.2.0133. ISSN 1540-3084. JSTOR 10.5406/amerlitereal.44.2.0133.
- Lant, Kathleen Margaret; Estes, Angela M. (1991). "The Feminist Redeemer: Louisa Alcott's Creation of the Female Christ in "Work"". Christianity and Literature. 40 (3): 223–253. ISSN 0148-3331. JSTOR 44314683.
- MacDonald, Ruth K. (1983). Louisa May Alcott. Boston, MA, USA: Twayne Publishers. ISBN 0-8057-7397-5.
- Maibor, Carolyn R. (2006). "Upstairs, Downstairs, and In-Between: Louisa May Alcott on Domestic Service". The New England Quarterly. 79 (1): 65–91. ISSN 0028-4866. JSTOR 20474412.
- Payne, Alma J. (1980). Salzman, Jack (ed.). Louisa May Alcott: A Reference Guide. Boston, Massachusetts, USA: G. K. Hall & Co. ISBN 0-8161-8032-6.
- Reisen, Harriet (2009). Louisa May Alcott: The Woman Behind Little Women. Henry Holt and Company. ISBN 978-0-8050-8299-9.
- Saxton, Martha (1995). Louisa May Alcott: A Modern Biography. USA: Farrar, Straus and Giroux.
- Šesnić, Jelena (October 26, 2022). "Louisa May Alcott's Changing Views on Women, Work, and Marriage in Work". European Journal of American Studies. 17 (3). doi:10.4000/ejas.18592. ISSN 1991-9336.
- Stern, Madeleine B., ed. (1984). Critical Essays on Louisa May Alcott. G. K. Hall and Company. ISBN 0-8161-8686-3.
- Strickland, Charles (1985). Victorian Domesticity: Families in the Life and Art of Louisa May Alcott. University of Alabama Press. ISBN 978-0-8173-9043-3 – via Internet Archive.
- Ullom, Judith C., ed. (1969). Louisa May Alcott: An Annotated, Selected Bibliography. Washington, D. C., USA: Library of Congress.
- Yellin, Jean Fagan (1980). "From Success to Experience: Louisa May Alcott's Work". The Massachusetts Review. 21 (3): 527–539. ISSN 0025-4878. JSTOR 25089071.
