= 1849 in literature =

This article contains information about the literary events and publications of 1849.

== Events ==
- February – J. A. Froude's semi-autobiographical, epistolary philosophical novel of religious doubt The Nemesis of Faith is published by John Chapman in London. A copy is burned by William Sewell, Dean of Exeter College, Oxford, himself a novelist.
- March–November – La Tribune des Peuples, a pan-European romantic nationalist periodical, is published by Adam Mickiewicz.
- April 22 – Fyodor Dostoyevsky and fellow members of the literary Petrashevsky Circle in Russia are arrested for expressing their progressive views. Sentenced to death on November 16 and facing a firing squad on December 23, he and some others are reprieved at the last moment and exiled to the katorga prison camps in Siberia.

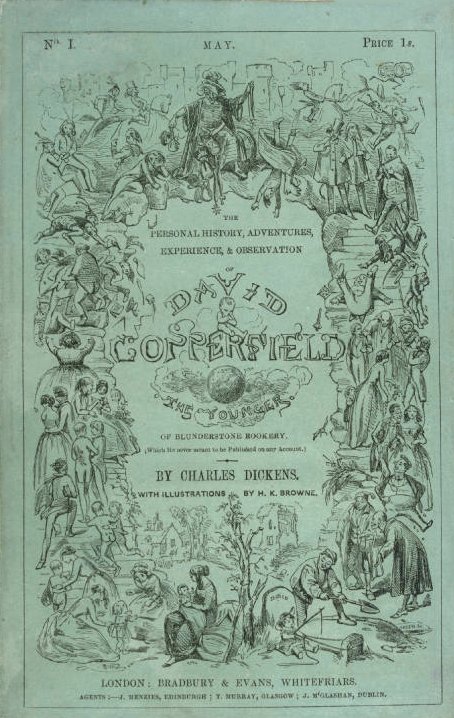
1st serial ed. cover

- May 1 – Charles Dickens's Bildungsroman David Copperfield begins serial publication by Bradbury and Evans in London.
- May 10 – The Astor Place Riot takes place in Manhattan over a dispute between two Shakespearean actors, the American Edwin Forrest and the Englishman William Macready. Over 20 people are killed when troops fire on the rioters.
- May 28 – Anne Brontë dies of tuberculosis aged 29 at Scarborough on the Yorkshire coast of England, where she is buried. Until 2013, her headstone mistakenly gives her age as 28.
- September 20 – Honoré de Balzac travels to Poland to meet Eveline Hanska, whom he will marry shortly before his death next year.
- October 3 – Death of Edgar Allan Poe: Edgar Allan Poe is found in Baltimore delirious, "in great distress, and... in need of immediate assistance". He dies on October 7 aged 40, of an uncertain cause, in Washington College Hospital. On October 9 the New York Tribune publishes an influential but substantially fictitious obituary written anonymously by Rufus Wilmot Griswold.
- October–December – Thomas De Quincey's essay The English Mail-Coach appears in issues of Blackwood's Edinburgh Magazine.
- November – The English scholarly correspondence magazine Notes and Queries is first published.
- November 13 – The public hanging in London of Marie Manning (murderer) is attended independently by Charles Dickens and Herman Melville; Dickens writes a letter published in the following day's issue of The Times decrying the "wickedness and levity of the immense crowd".
- November 14 – A public festival is held in Denmark to mark the 70th birthday of Adam Gottlob Oehlenschläger.
- Uncertain dates
  - The Leipzig publisher B. G. Teubner begins publishing the Bibliotheca Teubneriana series of editions of the Classics.
  - Who's Who is published for the first time in the United Kingdom.
  - Philip Massinger's play Believe as You List receives its first publication, 218 years after its theatrical première.

== New books ==
=== Fiction ===
- William Harrison Ainsworth – The Lancashire Witches
- Charlotte Brontë (as Currer Bell) – Shirley
- François-René de Chateaubriand – Memoirs from Beyond the Grave
- Charles Dickens – David Copperfield (begins serialization)
- Fyodor Dostoevsky – Netochka Nezvanova
- Alexandre Dumas, père – The Queen's Necklace
- Paul Féval – Les Belles-de-nuit ou Les Anges de la famille
- J. A. Froude – The Nemesis of Faith
- Catherine Gore – The Diamond and the Pearl
- Charles Kingsley – Alton Locke
- Herman Melville
  - Mardi
  - Redburn
- Mayne Reid – The Rifle Rangers
- G. W. M. Reynolds – The Bronze Statue
- George Sand – La Petite Fadette (Little Fadette)
- Theodor Storm – Immensee
- Frances Milton Trollope – The Lottery of Marriage

=== Children and young people ===
- Charlotte Mary Yonge – The Railroad Children

=== Drama ===
- Christian Friedrich Hebbel – Der Rubin
- John Westland Marston – Strathmore
- Gaspar Núñez de Arce – Amor y Orgullo
- Eugène Scribe and Ernest Legouvé – Adrienne Lecouvreur

=== Poetry ===
- Matthew Arnold – The Strayed Reveller
- Petrus Augustus de Genestet – De Sint-Nicolaasavond (Saint Nicholas's Eve)
- Elias Lönnrot (compiler) – Kalevala (new version)
- Edgar Allan Poe – "Annabel Lee", "Eldorado", "The Bells", "A Dream Within a Dream"

=== Non-fiction ===
- Josiah Henson – "The Life of Josiah Henson"
- John Mitchell Kemble – History of the Saxons in England
- Søren Kierkegaard (as Anti-Climacus) – The Sickness Unto Death (Sygdommen til Døden)
- Francis Parkman – The Oregon Trail
- Thomas Phillips – Wales, the Language, Social Condition, Moral Character, and Religious Opinions of the People, considered in their relation to Education...
- John Ruskin – The Seven Lamps of Architecture
- William Smith – Dictionary of Greek and Roman Biography and Mythology
- Henry David Thoreau – Resistance to Civil Government
- George Ticknor – A History of Spanish Literature
- Chandos Wren-Hoskyns – A Short Inquiry into the History of Agriculture in Mediæval and Modern Times

== Births ==
- January 9 – Laura Kieler (née Petersen), Norwegian novelist and dramatic inspiration (died 1932)
- January 22 – August Strindberg, Swedish dramatist (died 1912)
- February 18 – Alexander Kielland, Norwegian novelist (died 1906)
- February 27 – Václav Beneš Třebízský, Czech novelist (died 1884)
- March 10 – Mary Evelyn Hitchcock, American author and explorer (died 1920)
- April 1 – Mary K. Buck, Bohemian-born American author (died 1901)
- April 24
  - Emma Whitcomb Babcock, American litterateur and author (died 1926)
  - Helen Taggart Clark, American columnist, short story writer, and poet (died 1918)
- June 9 – Karl Tanera, German military writer and novelist (died 1904)
- July 22 – Emma Lazarus, American poet (died 1887)
- July 30 – Lettie S. Bigelow, American poet and author (died 1906)
- August 8 – Hume Nisbet, Scottish thriller writer, poet and artist (died 1923)
- August 9 – Amy Catherine Walton (née Deck, writing as Mrs. O. F. Walton), English writer of Christian children's books (died 1939)
- August 23 – W. E. Henley, English poet (died 1903)
- August 30 – J. M. Dent, English publisher (died 1926)
- September 3 – Sarah Orne Jewett, American writer (died 1909)
- October 7 – James Whitcomb Riley, American writer and poet (died 1916)
- October 31 – Marie Louise Andrews, American writer and editor (died 1891)
- December 16– Mary Hartwell Catherwood, American author and poet (died 1902)
- November 24 – Frances Hodgson Burnett, English children's writer and playwright (died 1924)
- date unknown

- Elisabeth Cavazza, American author, journalist and music critic (died 1926)
- Harriet Abbott Lincoln Coolidge, American philanthropist, author and reformer (died 1902)

== Deaths ==
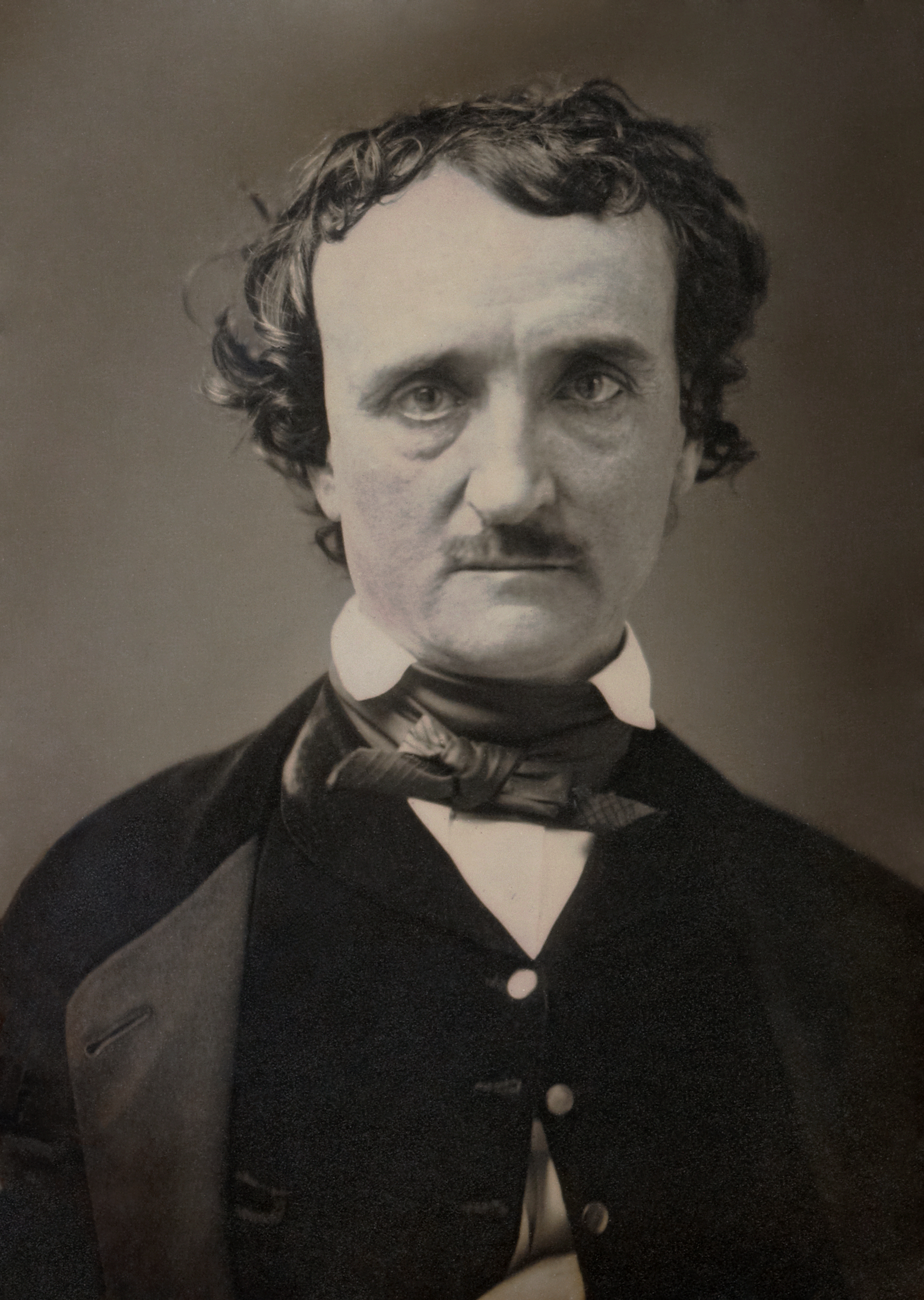
Daguerreotype of Edgar Allan Poe probably taken June 1849 in Lowell, Mass., a few months before his death

- January 6 – Hartley Coleridge, English poet and critic (alcohol-related, born 1796)
- February 8 – France Prešeren, Slovenian poet (liver disease, born 1800)
- February 19 – Bernard Barton, English Quaker poet (born 1784)
- May 22 – Maria Edgeworth, Anglo-Irish novelist (born 1768)
- May 28 – Anne Brontë, English novelist and poet (tuberculosis, born 1820)
- June 4 – Marguerite Gardiner, Countess of Blessington, Irish novelist and literary hostess (born 1789)
- July 7 – Goffredo Mameli, Italian poet (infection from bayonet wound, born 1827)
- July 12 – Horace (Horatio) Smith, English poet and novelist (born 1799)
- July 25 – James Kenney, English dramatist (born 1780)
- July 27 – Charlotte von Ahlefeld, German novelist (born 1781)
- July 31 – Sándor Petőfi, Hungarian poet and revolutionary (probably killed in Battle of Segesvár, born 1823)
- August 25 – Adele Schopenhauer, German novelist and paper-cut artist (born 1797)
- October 7 – Edgar Allan Poe, American poet, short story writer and critic (born 1809)
