= Karl Tanera =

German writer (1849–1904)

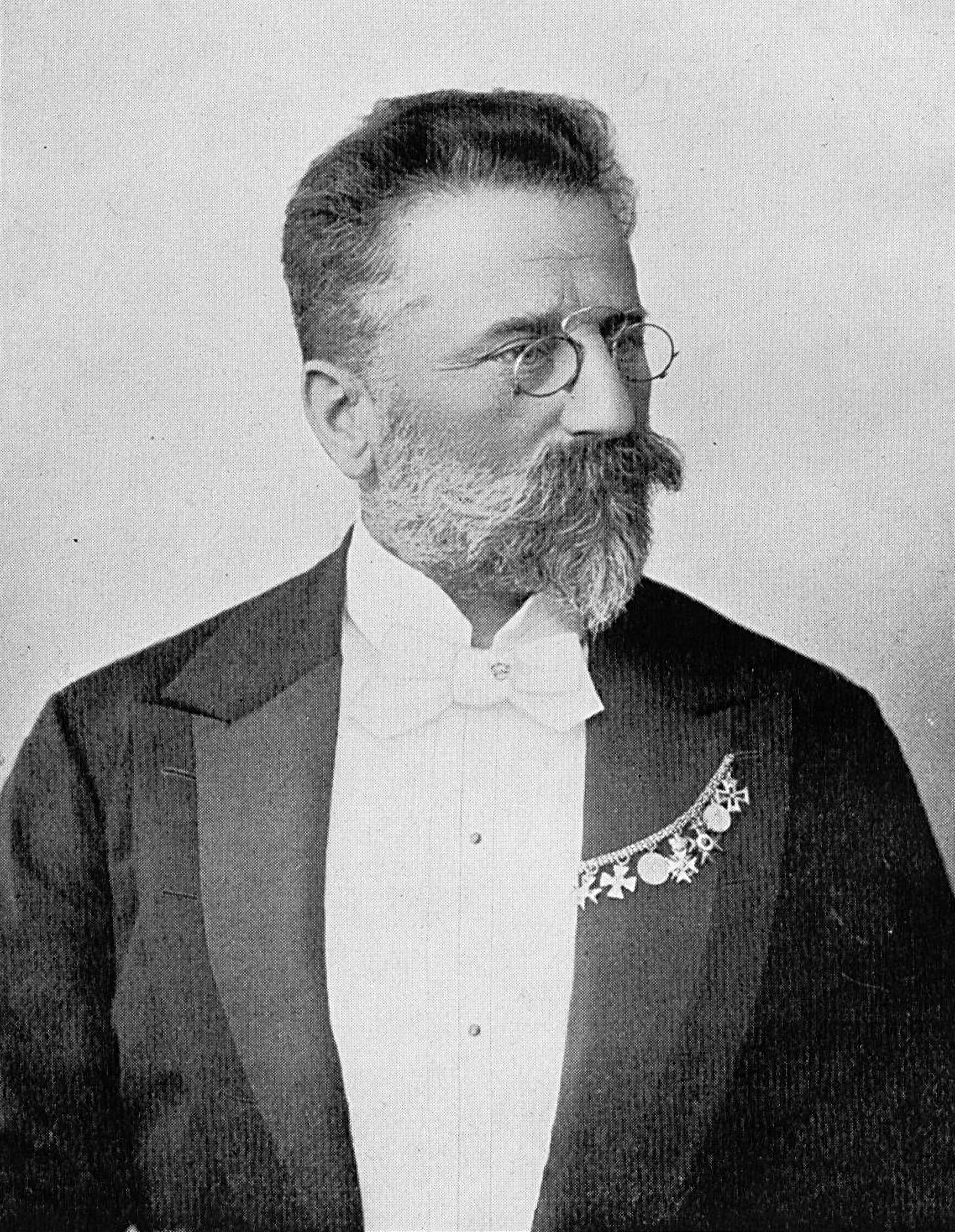
Carl Tanera

Karl Tanera (9 June 1849 – 4 October 1904) was a German military writer and novelist.

== Biography ==
Tanera was born in Landshut. He entered the Bavarian army in 1866, took part in the Franco-Prussian War of 1870-71, and was severely wounded during the siege of Paris. Having frequented the Kriegsakademie (war academy) in Berlin, in 1877-80, he was detailed to the department of military history in the great general staff, in 1882, but retired as a captain in 1887 to devote himself exclusively to his literary work. He died, aged 55, in Lindau.

== Works ==
To the collective work Der Krieg von 1870-71, dargestellt von Mitkämpfern (The war of 1870-71 described by people who fought in it, 1888–91) he contributed vols, i., iii., v., and vii.; and next published Deutschlands Kriege von Fehrbellin bis Königgrätz (Germany's wars from Fehrbellin to Königgrätz, 1891–94). His novels, military sketches, essays, and reminiscences of his extensive travels in the East and North Africa include: Durch ein Jahrhundert, Drei Kriegsgeschichtliche Romane (1892); Schwere Kämpfe (Hard fighting, 1897); Aus zwei Lagern, Kriegsroman (1899); Die Eurasierin (1900); Ernste und heitere Erinnerungen eines Ordonnanzoffiziers (1887, 8th ed., 1902); Offiziersleben in Krieg und Frieden (The officer's life in war and peace, 1889); Heiteres und Ernstes aus Altbayern (The light-hearted and serious from old Bavaria, 1895); Aus drei Weltteilen, Reiseskizzen (From three parts of the world, travel sketches, 1898); Deutschlands Kämpfe in Ostasien (1901); and Eine Weltreise (A world tour, 1902).
