= Peter Andresen Oelrichs =

Peter Andresen Oelrichs (26 February 1781, in Heligoland – 18 June 1869, in Amsterdam) was a captain. He was the author of Kleines Wörterbuch zur Erlernung der Helgolander Sprache für Deutsche, Engländer und Holländer, a vocabulary translating words spoken on the island of Heligoland into German, French and Dutch.
