= A Moreninha (novel) =

Book by Joaquim Manuel de Macedo

- Author: Joaquim Manuel de Macedo
- Language: Portuguese
- Genre: Urban Fiction, Romance novel
- Publication date: 1844
- Publication place: Brazil

A Moreninha is the first urban novel in Brazilian literature. This novel was written by Joaquim Manuel de Macedo (1820–1882), and it was first published in 1844 (the same year the author graduated in medicine) in the format of newspaper serials and later it was adapted to the book format. It was adapted into films in A Moreninha (1915), A Moreninha (1970) and another film with the performance of Cacilda Becker, Bibi Ferreira and Tito Fleury directed by Miroel Silveira began to be recorded in 1945, but was not completed, and into soap operas in A Moreninha (1965) and A Moreninha (1975).
