= Cynthia Taggart =

American poet

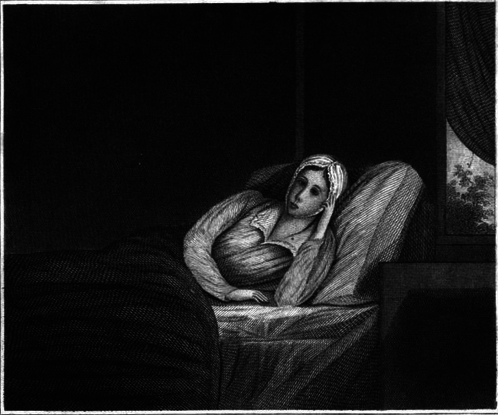
- Born: 1801/04 near Newport, Rhode Island, U.S.
- Died: 1849
- Occupation: poet
- Writing career
- Notable work: Poems

Cynthia Taggart (1801/04–1849) was a 19th-century American poet. A chronic invalid, she lived with unceasing pain, from her early infancy, during the period of her adolescence, and through the duration of her life. Physical anguish was a repetitive theme in Taggart's poems.

== Biography ==
Cynthia Taggart was born in 1801, or ca. 1804, in a cottage about 6 miles (9.7 km) from Newport, Rhode Island. She was the daughter of a soldier, whose property was destroyed during the American Revolution, and who died in old age and poverty at the family home.

Though she had few opportunities of learning, she did receive religious training. Taggart's education was very slight, and until sickness deprived her of all other occupation opportunities, about the year 1822, when she was 19 years of age, she appeared never to have thought of literary composition.

Taggart and a widowed sister, who was also an invalid, lived in their paternal home by the seashore. She enumerated among her greatest sufferings, an inability to sleep. For many years, she was unable to sleep, except when taking anodynes. It was during these long night, when she was in severe pain, that she developed her poetry.

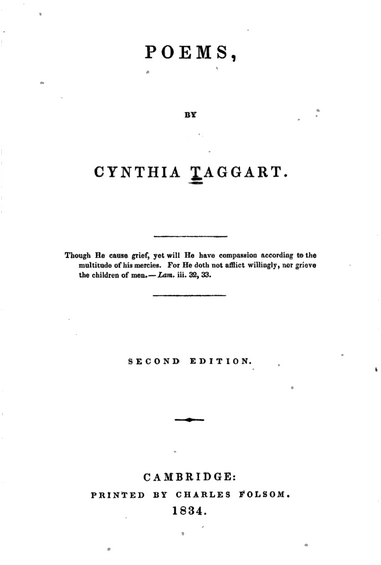
Poems

Her poems were collected and published in 1834, with an autobiography, describing her hopeless and helpless condition. The poems were published by some friends to avert poverty and dependence from Taggart's life. The work passed through three editions, two in 1834 and one in 1848.

Taggart died in 1849. Rev. James C. Richmond wrote Taggart's biography in The Rhode Island Cottage.
