= Sophie Bolander =

Swedish writer (1807–1869)

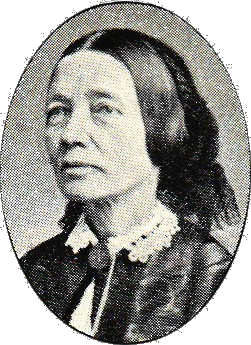
Sophie Bolander

Sophie Christina Mathilda Bolander (28 January 1807 – 2 June 1869), was a Swedish author. She is most famed for her participation in the contemporary debate on gender issues.

== Life ==
Sophie Bolander was born in Gothenburg, the daughter of the wealthy factory owner Gustav Erik Bolander (d. 1826) and Johanna Kristina Carlström. She never married. She lost her mother at an early age, and after the death of her father, she lived with her brother. She worked as a governess in the household of count Posse in 1838–1844, and as a music teacher in the Kjellbergska flickskolan in 1845–1855.

=== Career ===
Her anti-aristocratic novel Trolldomstecknet (The Magic Sign) has been regarded as one of the first tendency novels in Sweden. During the 1850s, many of her novels were published as serials in papers such as Göteborgs Handels- och Sjöfartstidning, Post- och Inrikes Tidningar and Aftonbladet. Her novels were romance stories, often in a historical setting.

Bolander is mostly known for her participation in the contemporary gender debate. Her writings focused on marriage and motherhood as the one and only true goal for a woman. She supported Fredrika Bremer in her critique of the shallow education of accomplishments for girls, and her demand that it should be replaced with a serious education more equal to that given to boys. However, in contrast to Bremer and the other reformists, Bolander did not support the idea that women should be given a serious education to prepare them for an emancipated life as independent professionals, but rather that they should be given a serious academic education because this would make them better wives and mothers. Fredrika Bremer remarked about this, that Sophie Bolander was only prepared to meet her halfway. However, Bolander was, in this respect, supporting a common view among contemporary moderate reformists.

Her novel Qvinnan med förmyndare (Woman with Guardian) was a conservative response to the novel Qvinnan utan förmyndare (Woman without Guardian) by Amelie von Strussenfelt, which was a part of the contemporary debate about the minority of adult unmarried women, who were legally under the guardianship of their closest male relative.

== Selected works ==
- »Tante Agnetas aftonberättelser» (1840)
- »Qvinnan med förmyndare» (1842)
- »Modern i hemmet» (1844)
- »Trolldomstecknet» (1845)

== Other sources ==
- Sophie C M Bolander, urn:sbl:17900, Svenskt biografiskt lexikon (art av E. Lindström.), hämtad 2015-05-08.
- Kvinnan inom svenska litteraturen intill år 1893. En bibliografi
