= Rosa Louise Woodberry =

American journalist and educator (1869 - 1932)

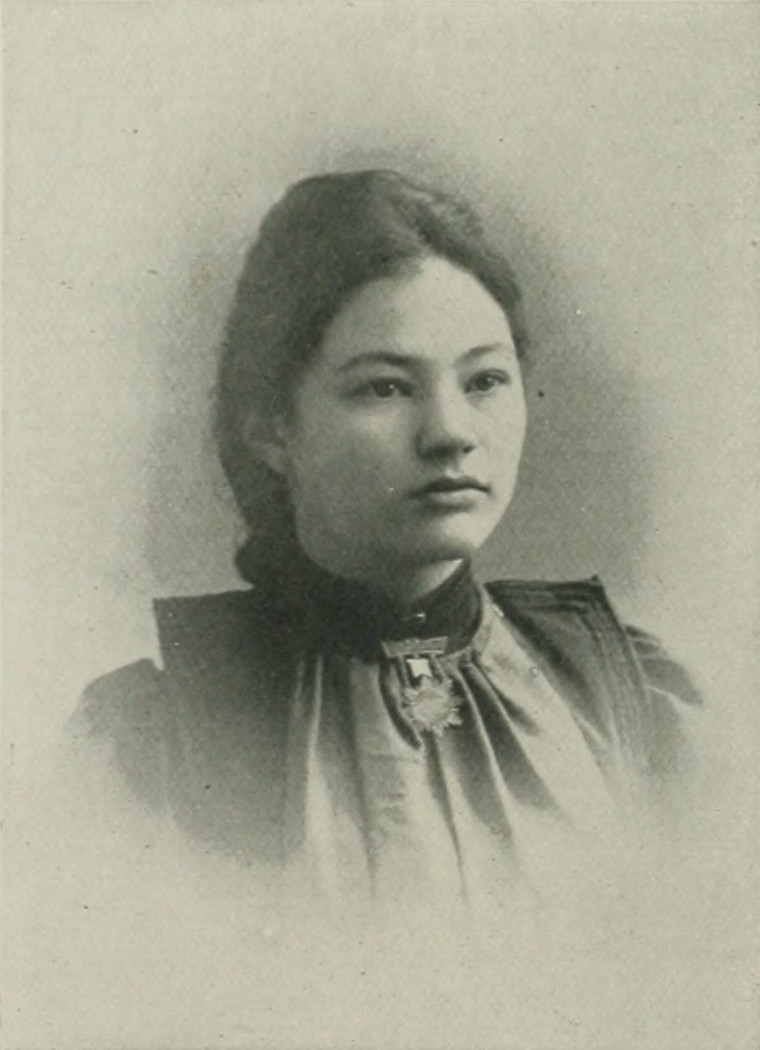
- Photo in A Woman of the Century
- Born: March 11, 1869; Barnwell County, South Carolina, U.S.
- Died: July 17, 1932 (aged 63); Fulton County, Georgia, U.S.
- Resting place: Bonaventure Cemetery, Savannah, Georgia, U.S.
- Occupations: journalist; stenographer; school founder, principal, educator
- Writing career
- Language: English

Rosa Louise Woodberry (March 11, 1869 – July 17, 1932) was an American journalist, educator, and stenographer. She was the founder and principal of Woodberry Hall, and the first woman to attend the University of Georgia. Her articles and sketches, usually of a philosophic and scientific bent, were frequently seen and quoted in journals North and South. She did a great deal of journalistic work for Georgia dailies, and was for two or three years on the staff of The Augusta Chronicle, and during her vacations at home in the summer, was on the staff of the Savannah Press.

== Early life and education ==
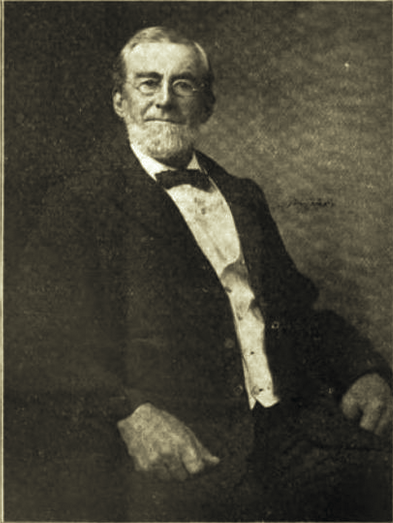
Stratford Benjamin Woodberry

Rosa Louise Woodberry was born in Barnwell County, South Carolina, March 11, 1869. She is next to the oldest in a family of nine, and comes from a long line of ardent Carolinians. Her father, Stratford Benjamin Woodberry, was for years a distinguished bass singer of Charleston, South Carolina. Her mother, Victoria Ida Cocroft Woodberry, hailed from an old family of Beaufort, South Carolina.

She spent the first thirteen years of her life in a small town, Williston, South Carolina, and there received her early education. Her parents then removed to Augusta, Georgia, where she was graduated with first honor as valedictorian of her class at Augusta High School. She graduated from Lucy Cobb Institute, Athens, Georgia, in 1891.

It was during her school life in that city she began her literary work and became a contributor to various journals. At the same time, she learned shorthand.

From her earliest years, she discussed State and political themes with her father, which accounted for her fervent patriotism and devotion to her native State. Her eager interest and patriotic devotion made her keenly aware to all political, social and humanitarian movements, and led her to give close attention to the study of political economy, especially in its bearing upon the industrial present and future of the South.

In 1899, Woodberry attempted to enroll as a student in the University of Georgia but was denied entrance at that time. Later, she was allowed to enroll, earning a B.A. degree from the University of Georgia (Education, 1927) and a M.A. degree from Oglethorpe University (1928).

== Career ==
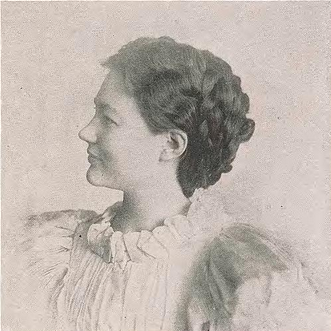
Rosa Louise Woodberry

Soon after, she took a position on the staff of The Augusta Chronicle, being in charge of the literature class at Lucy Cobb Institute. Woodberry was a close reader of current events, and did a great deal to popularize this study among the young women of Lucy Cobb Institute. She had a class that frequently numbered a hundred, in current topics, civil government and political economy, and the debates on live topics, mock elections and tariff arguments of her pupils frequently attracted the favorable comment of newspapers throughout the country. In 1894, Woodberry was elected to the chair of Natural Science in Lucy Cobb Institute, and was probably the only young woman in the South who had a laboratory of physical and chemical apparatus, and performed the experiments for her class. She was grateful for the inspiration and encouragement of the school principals she served under, Miss Rutherford and Mrs. M. A. Lipscomb.

During vacations, her home was in Savannah, Georgia. She made time to do a great deal of literary work, and occupied herself with reading books and newspapers. Her stories, sketches, poems and critical reviews appeared in various papers and magazines. She gave much of her time to the study of science, and was a close observer of scientific phenomena. She won a prize of US$50 for the best essay on the method of improving small industries in the South, offered by The Augusta Chronicle. She had an intense sympathy with girls who earned their own living, and she was warmly interested in all that concerned their progress and encouragement, Having been a stenographer herself, she knew from experience the realities of a vocation.

In 1908, she became the founder and principal of Woodberry Hall School for Girls in Atlanta. She took groups of her students for European travel.

== Personal life ==
Woodberry was an enthusiastic advocate of organization of women for study, whether of science, literature, art, music or civics. A great deal of her time was devoted to extending the Georgia Federation of Woman's Clubs (GFWC). She was an officer of the GFWC, serving as State parliamentarian. She was a member of the Atlanta Daughters of the Confederacy; and secretary of the Women's Auxiliary of the Diocese of Atlanta. She was a member of the Woman's Press Club of Georgia, and served as an officer in that organization.

In religion, she was affiliated with the Episcopal Church. She co-founded the All Saints Episcopal Church in Atlanta and served as president of the Christian Council of Churchwomen. She was a leader in church missionary work.

Woodberry died July 17, 1932, in Fulton County, Georgia, and was buried at Bonaventure Cemetery, Savannah, Georgia.
