= Edward Meredith Cope =

English classical scholar (1818–1873)

Edward Meredith Cope (28 July 1818 – 15 August 1873) was an English classical scholar.

He was educated at Ludlow College and then Shrewsbury. He then went onto Trinity College, Cambridge, of which society he was elected fellow in 1842, having taken his degree in 1841 as senior classic. He was for many years lecturer at Trinity, his favorite subjects being the Greek tragedians Plato and Aristotle.

When the professorship of Greek became vacant, the votes were equally divided between Cope and BH Kennedy, and the latter was appointed by the chancellor. It is said that the keenness of Cope's disappointment was partly responsible for the mental affliction by which he was attacked in 1869, and from which he never recovered.

As his published works show, Cope was a thoroughly sound scholar, with perhaps a tendency to over-minuteness. He was the author of An Introduction to Aristotle's Rhetoric (1867), a standard work; The Rhetoric of Aristotle, with a commentary, revised and edited by JE Sandys (1877); translations of Plato's Gorgias (2nd ed., 1884) and Phaedo (revised by H Jackson, 1875). Mention may also be made of his criticism of Grote's account of the Sophists, in the Cambridge Journal of Classical Philology, vols. i., ii., iii. (1854–1857).
