= Olivia Ward Bush-Banks =

American journalist

- Born: Olivia Ward; February 27, 1869; Sag Harbor, Long Island, New York; United States
- Died: April 8, 1944 (aged 75); New York City, New York; United States
- Occupations: Poet; journalist; author; novelist; writer; columnist
- Writing career
- Period: 1916–1930s

Olivia Ward Bush-Banks (née Olivia Ward; February 27, 1869 – April 8, 1944) was an American author, poet and journalist of African-American and Montaukett Native American heritage. Ward celebrated both of her heritages in her poetry and writing. She was a regular contributor to the Colored American magazine and wrote a column for the New Rochelle, New York publication, the Westchester Record-Courier. Over the span of her lifetime (1899-1942), Olivia Ward Bush-Banks wrote seventy-five poems, created twenty-three plays, and even a memoir titled Blue 32.

== Early life and education ==
Born February 27, 1869, in Sag Harbor, Long Island, New York, Ward was the third of three daughters of Eliza Draper and Abraham Ward, her mother was of African-American and Montaukett descent, her father was of Portuguese, East Indian, and African descent. Ward's mother died when she was about nine months old, and her father moved with the family to Providence, Rhode Island. When her father remarried there, he gave young Olivia to her mother's sister Maria Draper for care, who reared Olivia as her own. She attended local schools in Providence, and studied nursing in high school. She also became interested in drama and poetry.

=== Marriage and family ===
In 1889, Ward married Frank Bush. The couple had two daughters, Rosamund and Maria. After Ward and Bush divorced around 1895, Ward supported her daughters and her then-aged Aunt Maria. She was reportedly close to her second daughter Marie and her granddaughter Helen, who lived in New York.

Ward married again in 1916 to Anthony Banks, a Pullman porter. Her first daughter Rosamund married and died young, in 1929.

Olivia Ward Bush Banks died April 8, 1944, in New York City.

== Career ==
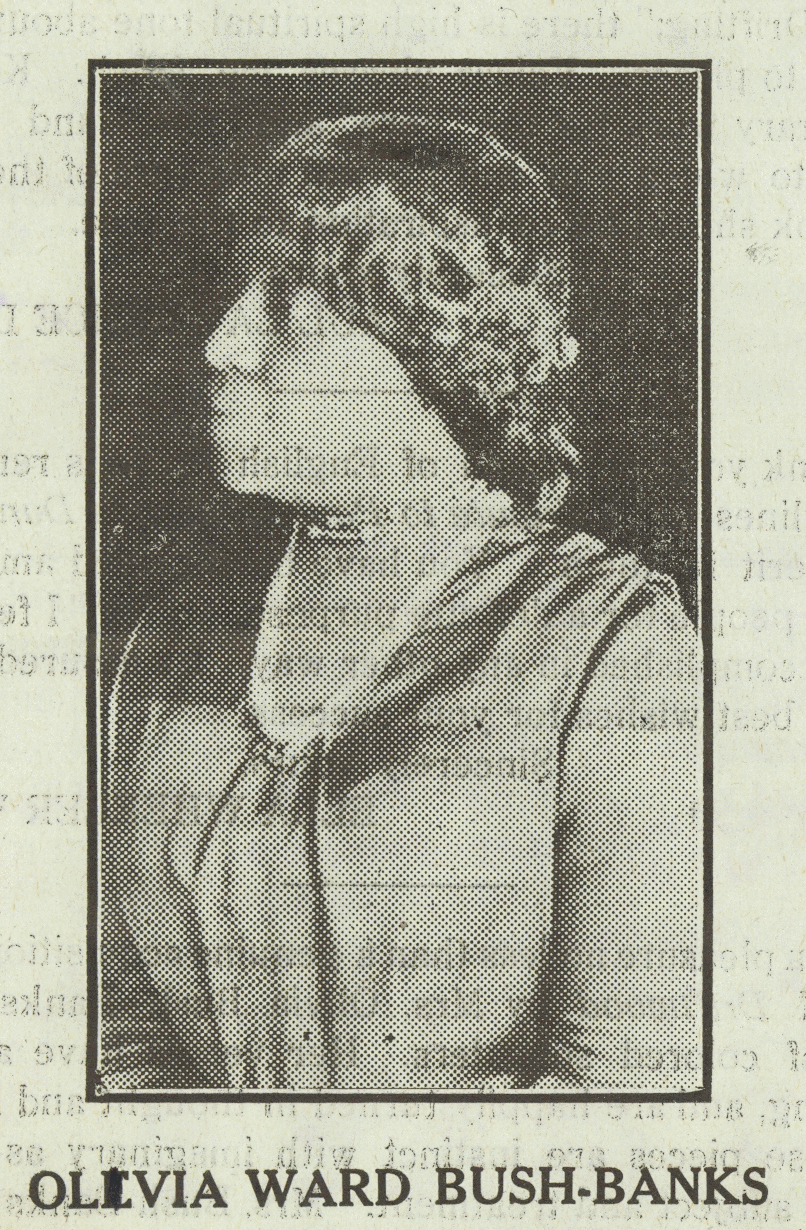
Olivia Ward Bush-Banks, c. 1920

Ward found work at times in either Providence and Boston, whatever she could find to support her family. Despite long days working, she wrote and published her first book of poetry, a slim volume called Original Poems in 1899. She received excellent reviews from the respected Paul Laurence Dunbar, an African-American poet. By 1900 she was working as an assistant theater director at the Robert Gould Shaw Settlement House in Boston, where she continued until about 1914.

Ward returned to Long Island with her daughters, where her interest in the arts continued to grow. Her mother and aunt had been raised in the Montaukett culture, which was important to Ward. Living at the easterly end of the South Fork, she served as the Montaukett tribal historian, a position she held until about 1916. She published her second, more substantial, volume of poetry, Driftwood in 1914. This was her most popular volume.

By 1918 or so, Ward had moved to Chicago, Illinois, with her second husband Anthony Banks, whose job with the Pullman Company was based there. She wrote her first play, Indian Trails: or Trail of the Montauk; as it survives only in fragments, scholars estimate a date of 1920. It seems to be a reaction to the New York State Supreme Court decision in Wyandank Pharaoh v. Jane Benson et al. After that, she turned more of her writing to the African-American experience. Chicago was becoming an important urban center of black life, music and culture during the Great Migration, as tens of thousands of blacks left the rural South and moved to northern industrial cities.

Ward became a regular contributor to Colored American magazine and a strong supporter of the "New Negro Movement." She helped sculptor Richmond Barthé and writer Langston Hughes get their starts during the Harlem Renaissance. Ward expressed her passion about the struggles of African Americans and the need for social change through her writing. She also demonstrated her faith in God through her words.

The Banks established and ran the Bush-Banks School of Expression in Chicago, which became a place for black artists to gather and nurture their art. Actors and musicians gave recitals and performances at the school. Ward continued her artistic endeavors, focusing on drama. She also worked teaching drama in the Chicago public school system. From the late 1920s on, she traveled between Chicago and New York, where her surviving daughter Marie lived with her family.

In the 1930s, Ward returned east to live in New Rochelle, New York and New York City. In 1936 she was part of the Works Progress Administration's Theatre Project during the Great Depression. She counted civil rights activist W. E. B. Du Bois; poet and novelist Countee Cullen; Julia Ward Howe; and actor/singer Paul Robeson among her friends.

In the 1930s she wrote an arts column and acted as arts editor for the Westchester Record-Courier. She also served with the Works Progress Administration as a drama coach at the Abyssinian Baptist Church's Community Center, from 1936 to 1939. Abyssinian served as an important location for secular as well as religious music and art during the Harlem Renaissance and later.

Ward wrote several plays and short stories, most of which were never published, some because she expressed issues of interracial culture.

Ward's work is notable for preserving regional and ethnic dialects that would otherwise have no written record. She also wrote of the Native American experience in her work, preserving some of the Algonquian Montauk language and folklore, especially during the early part of her career. Later, after moving to Chicago, she wrote more about the African-American experience, and reflected its values (political, cultural, and religious.)

== Activism and Service ==
Bush-Banks was involved in the North East Federation of Women's Clubs. She also served as an Urban League Volunteer in Chicago, Illinois oftentimes working with children of the Farren School. In addition to this, Olivia Ward Bush Banks was a member of the Red Cap's Literary Club where she led and delivered an address in the summer of 1924.
