= Ulrika von Strussenfelt =

Swedish writer

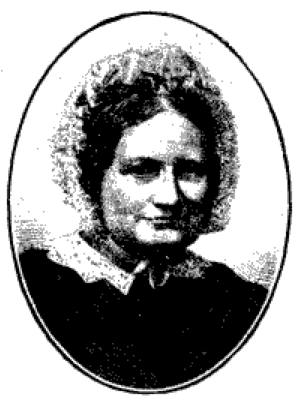
Ulrika von Strussenfelt

Ulrika "Ulla" Sophia von Strussenfelt (9 May 1801 – 16 January 1873), was a Swedish writer. She was a popular writer of historical novels and has been referred to as one of the most productive Swedish novelists of her time.

== Life ==
Von Strussenfelt was born in Hilleshög. She was the daughter of the courtier and nobleman Michael von Strussenfelt and Fredrika Beata Lindencrona, and the sister of the writer Amelie von Strussenfelt.

Her mother died in childbirth in 1803 and her father left the country after his remarriage not long after, and she was placed in the care of her maternal grandparents, while her sister was placed in the care of her paternal grandparents. The sisters were to have a bad relationship, and von Strussenfelt placed the blame for her late development as a writer on the fact that her sister had always been considered the more gifted.

Von Strussenfelt never married, and like her sister, she supported herself as a governess, which was at the time the most common profession for a middle- or upper class woman: between 1834 and 1859, she managed her own school for girls.

Early active as a translator for periodicals, she started to publish novels in the 1840s. While her novels were never met with admiration by literary critics, they were popular among the public and successful enough to be translated into several languages. Most of her novels were historical and written in a nationalistic, but in the same time liberal tone.

Von Strussenfelt died in Stockholm.

== Selected works ==
- Pehr Brahe den yngre (1–2, 1856–57)
- Magnus Stenbock (1859)
- Wæra eller Trohetens prof (1851)
- Bröderne eller 1808 och 1809 (1857)

== Sources ==
- Svenskt biografiskt lexikon (artikel av Stefan Johansson med bidrag av Andreas Tjerneld (Constantia Carolina Amalia v S)
