= Charlotte von Ahlefeld =

German novelist

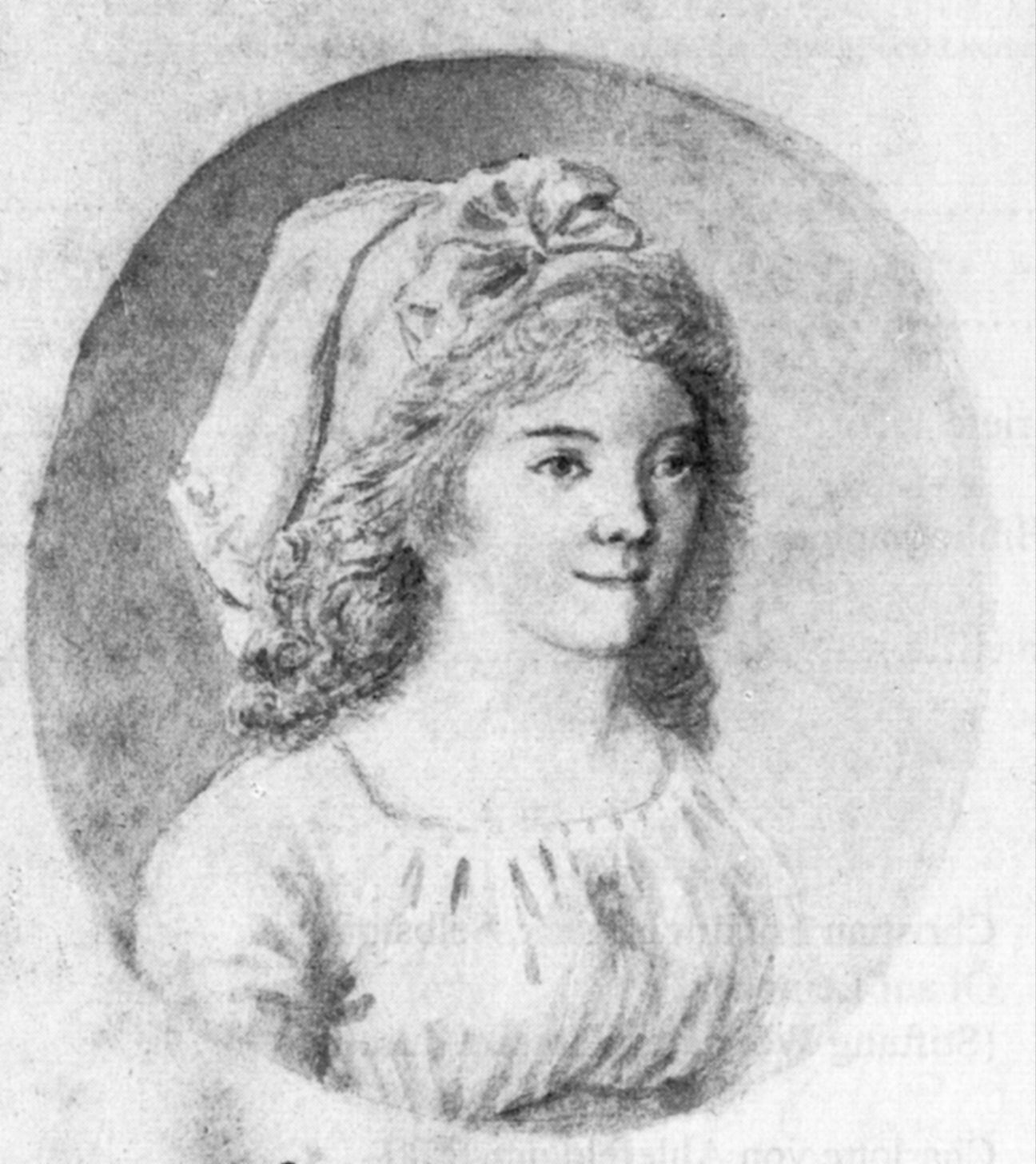
- Born: Charlotte von Seebach; December 6, 1781; Erfurt, Germany
- Died: July 27, 1849 (aged 67); Teplitz, Bohemia
- Spouse: Johann Ritter von Ahlefeld (1798–1807)
- Writing career
- Pen name: Elise Selbig, Ernestine, Natalia
- Genres: Novels, poetry
- Notable work: Liebe und Trennung (1797)

Charlotte Sophie Luise Wilhelmine von Ahlefeld (December 6, 1781 – July 27, 1849) was a German novelist and poet.

== Early life ==
Von Ahlefeld was born in Ottmannshausen, near Erfurt, on December 6, 1781 as Charlotte von Seebach, to a noble family of Hanover. Her father was the commander Alexander Christoph August von Seebach (1735–1811) and her mother was Albertine Wilhelmine, née von Ingersleben (1748–1813).

Von Ahlefeld was educated at the Weimar Drawing School, and began to write at a young age. She debuted some of her first poems at the court of Grand Duchess Louise, Duke Karl August’s wife, where they were well-received.

Her first novel, German: Liebe und Trennung oder merkwürdige Geschichte der unglücklichen Liebe zweyer Fürstlichen Personen jetziger Zeit, appeared in 1797, and attracted positive comments from Goethe.

== Marriage and career ==
A year later, she married Johann Ritter von Ahlefeld (1757–1848), a landowner from Schleswig, on May 21, 1798. She was very unhappy and complained about her new life in letters to her friend and fellow German writer Sophie Mereau-Brentano. Her marriage to von Ahlefeld produced three children: Friedrich (1799–1862), Erich (1800–1853) and Hermann (1806–1855).

While she was married, Charlotte wrote approximately 30 works, in addition to some poems, on the topic of domestic conflicts. She would frequently publish novels under pseudonyms like Elise Selbig and Ernestine, and poetry under the name Natalia.

The couple officially separated in 1807, but she continued to live in Schleswig until 1821, when she moved to back to Weimar and befriended Charlotte von Stein.

== Later life and legacy ==
In 1846, Charlotte went to the spa town of Teplitz in Bohemia due to declining health, and died there in 1849. She was the author of over 50 novels and poetry collections.

== Selected novels ==
- Liebe und Trennung (1797)
- Marie Müller (1799)
- Erna (1820)
- Felicitas (1826)

== Sources ==
- Ripley, George; Dana, Charles Anderson (1873). "Ahlefeld, Charlotte Sophie Luise Wilhelmine". The American Cyclopaedia. Vol. 1. p. 211.
- Karl Goedeke (1875). "Ahlefeldt, Charlotte von". Allgemeine Deutsche Biographie. Allgemeine Deutsche Biographie (in German). Vol. 1. p. 160.
- Charlotte von Ahlefeld on Dansk Forfatterleksikon (in Danish)
