= A Strange Man =

Play by Mikhail Lermontov

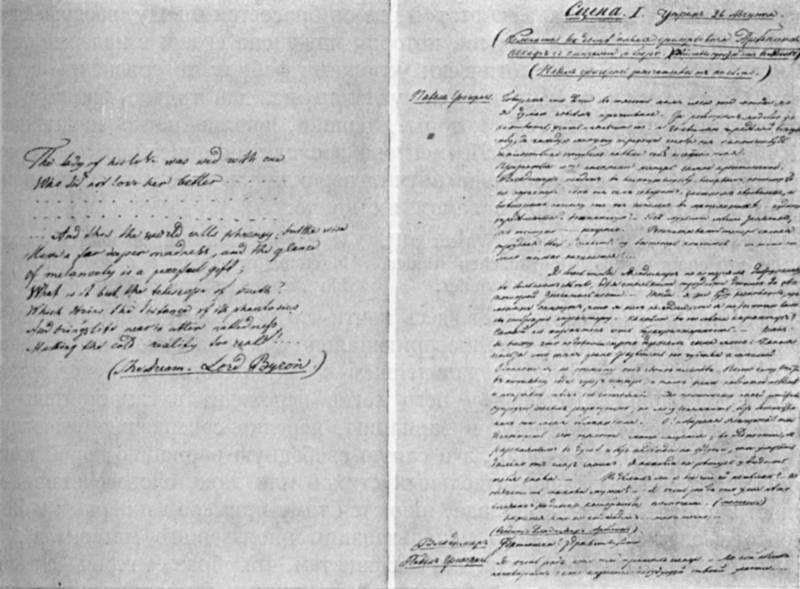
- Lermontov's autograph Byron's epigraph and the first page
- Written by: Mikhail Lermontov
- Characters: Vladimir Arbenin; Belinskoy
- Original language: Russian
- Genre: Romantic drama

Premiere
- Date premiered: 1916; Sukhodolsky Theatre, Moscow

A Strange Man (Russian: Странный человек, romanized: Strannyi tchelovek) is a play by Mikhail Lermontov, written in 1831 and published first in Saint Petersburg, in 1860, by Stepan Dudyshkin (with considerable cuts made in order to pass censorship), then, for the first time in its entirety, in 1880, by Pyotr Yefremov, in the compilation Early Plays by M.Yu.Lermontov.

== Background ==
A Strange Man, described by its author as 'romantic drama', is largely autobiographical and closely linked to its predecessor, Menschen und Liedenschaften (1830). Part of Yuri Volin's "sacrilegious" monologue is being reproduced here, now as Vladimir Arbenin's monologue, as well as the scene where the servant Ivan refuses to accept the money from his master and the latter throws the wallet into the window. Arbenin in the play is a poet and several poems written by the young Lermontov are ascribed to the protagonist. The autobiographical aspect of it is highlighted by the author's introduction: "I decided to tell the drama that was real... Characters featured here have been taken from the real life."

A Strange Man is more socially oriented than Menschen und Leidenschaften, and in its bid to analyze the moods of the new generation ("looking for the mission and suffering from the burden of knowledge," according to critic G.M.Friedlender) deals mostly with the Russian society as a whole, not just the protagonist's family life, although there are references here to Lermontov's mother unhappy life and early death.

Later critics noticed that both Menschen und Leidenschaften and A Strange Man had certain resemblances to Vissarion Belinsky's early drama Dmitry Nikitin (1831). The two young writers, though, unacquainted at the time, were working on their respective plays almost simultaneously. An obvious point of reference for both might have been Alexander Griboyedov's comedy Woe from Wit, unpublished at the time but a popular salon read, circulating in handwritten copies. The similarity of some episodes of A Strange Man and Dmitry Nikitin could be explained by the fact that the two families, Lermontovs and the Belinskys, were neighbours in Tchembarsky Uyezd of Penza Governorate, according to Pavel Viskovatov.

Vladimir Arbenin's love drama could be seen as reflecting Lermontov's feelings towards Natalya Ivanova whom he dedicated thirty poems in the early 1830s. Princess Sofja's prototype could have been Ivanova's cousin, Princess Gorchakova. Several of the student characters had their real prototypes too, among them A.D.Zakrevsky, whose article "The View Upon the History of Russia" was published in Teleskop (1833, signed A.Z.).
