= The Fugitive (poem) =

Poem by Mikhail Lermontov

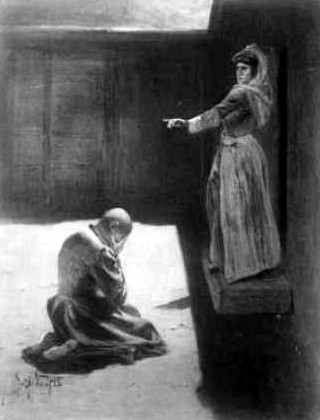
Garun rejected by his own mother. Illustration by N.N. Dubovsky, 1890

"The Fugitive" (Russian: Беглец, romanized: Beglets) is a poem by Mikhail Lermontov, written in 1838 (according to Pavel Viskovatov, citing Akim Shan-Girey, the poet's relative) and first published in 1846, by the Sevodnya i Vtchera (Today and Yesterday) almanac. The final one in Lermontov's Caucasian cycle, it was tagged as the "Highlanders' legend" by the author.

== Background ==
The poem, telling the story of a young man who left the battlefield, returned home and was rejected by his loved ones, was apparently a take on the piece of a local folklore. The French author Tetbu de Marigny in his book The Voyage to Circassia (Brussels, 1821) mentions a song about a boy who "happened to be the only one who'd returned home from the fight with Russians where all of his comrades died and got banished by his own people." Several literary historians noted similarities that "The Fugitive" had with the unfinished Alexander Pushkin's poem Tazit, published in Sovremennik (under the title "Galub") in the end of 1837. The song of Garun's bride borrows a lot from Selim's song from earlier Lermontov's poem Ismail-Bei.

== Legacy ==
The story, expressing sympathy with the native Caucasians' fight against the Imperial Russian troops proved to be popular with Russian revolutionaries. Nikolai Chernyshevsky in the last episodes of his What Is to Be Done? novel quoted the song of Garun's bride.

Vladimir Lenin too was pondering over the true meaning of the words pronounced by one of the poem's characters, "a mourning woman". "She summons Vera Pavlovna and Kirsanovs down into the [revolutionary] underground. That's the meaning [of the song]," the 1917 Revolution leader argued.

Pyotr Lavrov, speaking to members of the Society of Russian Students in Paris who gathered to celebrate Lermontov's 50th anniversary, stressed the relevance of "The Fugitive". "I'd like to believe that an apostate, the one who'd betray the Russian [revolutionary] cause will get the same kind of anger and contempt from all the forward-thinking Russian people as Lermontov's Fugitive received from his people," he said.
