= Valerik (poem) =

Poem by Mikhail Lermontov

"Valerik" (Russian: Валерик) is a war poem published in 1843 by the Russian Romantic writer Mikhail Lermontov.

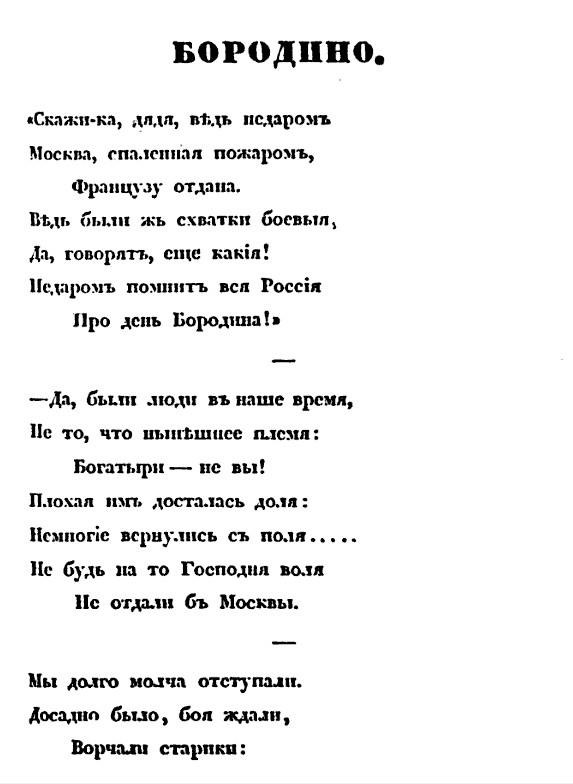
Valerik

== The battle ==
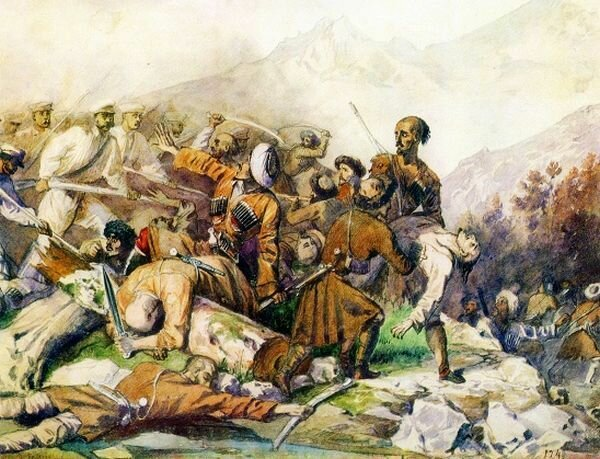
Battle of the River Valerik by Lermontov, who was also a painter

The Battle of the Valerik River was fought on July 11, 1840, between the Imperial Russian Army and Chechen and Ingush mountain tribesmen, as part of the Russian conquest of the Caucasus.

Mikhail Lermontov, a lieutenant in the Tenginsky Regiment, showed exemplary valor in the battle. Eyewitness accounts describe him astride a white horse, leading his men into battle with reckless abandon. The official battle report stated:

This officer [Lermontov], disregarding any danger, fulfilled his duties with outstanding courage and composure, and was with the first rank of the bravest soldiers assaulting the enemy's entrenchments.

For this, Lermontov was awarded the Order of St. Vladimir Fourth Class, but he never received the award as his name was removed from the final list of recipients by Czar Nicholas I, who harbored a strong dislike for the contumacious poet.

== The poem ==
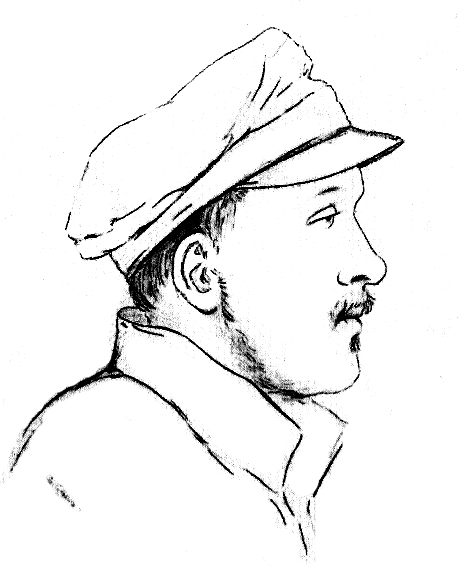
Lermontov, in a sketch made shortly after the battle by D. P. Palen

After the battle, Lermontov struggled to find a way to express his experience. His own feelings about combat were mixed - he wrote in a letter that he had developed "a taste for war" as a gamble with death and with breezy sarcasm described "the ravine where this fun took place", but the poem he wrote ultimately viewed war as a senseless slaughter, and he and the fighters (on both sides) as "beasts" violating the beautiful world of his beloved pristine Caucasus

Although the poem contains battle scenes both stirring and grisly (which correlate in great detail to the official action report), it ends on a pensive note as the protagonist sits on a drum after the battle:

Heartsick, I pondered the mystery.

I thought: poor people.
What do we want!
The sky is clear,
And under the sky
Is a place for each of us.
But incessantly and needlessly
We fight. Why?
Galub interrupted my reverie,
Struck me on the shoulder.
What is the name of this place,
I asked him.
Valerik, he answered me.
And translated into your language,

That would be... River of Death.

"Valerik" was first published (with omissions) posthumously in 1843 in the anthology Dawn.
