= Borodino (poem) =

Poem by Mikhail Lermontov

"Borodino" (Russian: Бородино) is a poem by Russian poet Mikhail Lermontov which describes the Battle of Borodino, the major battle of Napoleon's invasion of Russia. It was first published in 1837 in the literary magazine Sovremennik.

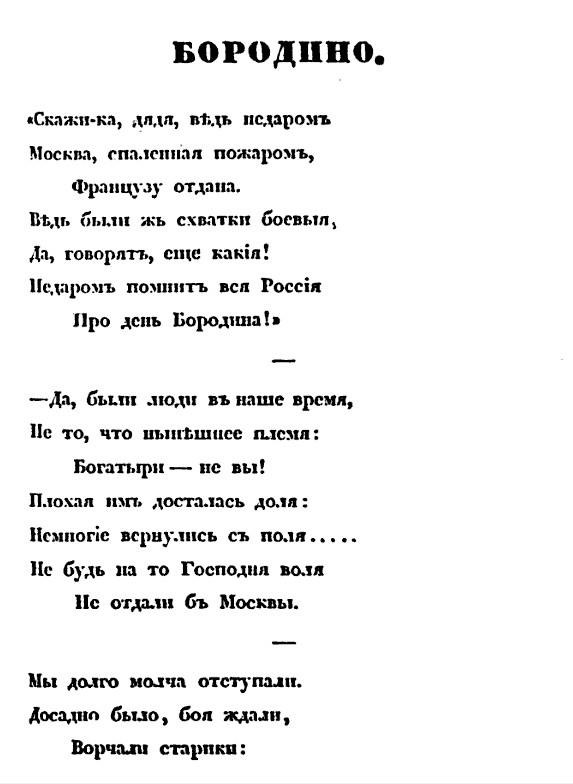
Borodino

The poem was based on his 1831 teenage version, "The Battlefield of Borodino" (Поле Бородина).

The poem starts with the direct appeal "Tell me, uncle, ...". Lermontov had several relatives (Arsenyevs and Stolypins) who were veterans of the Patriotic War of 1812, and there has been speculation that the poem was based on the narrations of one of them. Other critics suggest that his original version was written under the influence of Denis Davydov's Borodino Battlefield (Бородинское поле).

== Links ==
- English translation of "Borodino"
- Another English translation
