= Boyarin Orsha =

Poem by Mikhail Lermontov

Boyarin Orsha (Russian: Боярин Орша) is a poem by Mikhail Lermontov, written in 1835-1836 and first published by Andrey Krayevsky in the No.7, 1842, issue of Otechestvennye Zapiski.

== Background ==
A romantic poem, influenced by Lord Byron's "Parisina" (from which comes the epigraph to Chapter I), "Boyarin Orsha" also reflects Lermontov's interest in Russian folklore and history. The poem's action takes place in the time of Ivan Grozny and the Livonian War (1558-1583).

The author seems to be ambivalent about the moral choice his hero makes: fighting successfully for personal rights and freedom, Arseny commits treason and finds himself siding with the enemy, fighting his own people.

== Synopsis ==
Arseny falls in love with his master Boyarin Orsha's daughter and plots to take her away from her father's home. On discovering this, the old man locks the girl into her room and throws the key into Dnieper. The young man faces igumen and monks who interrogate him, but refuses to name his accomplices. On the night before the execution Arseny, helped by his mysterious friends, escapes from his cell. He finds himself in Lithuania, now at war with Russia. Some time later, he returns with the invasion force. After one particularly fierce battle, he finds dying Orsha among the dead men lying on the ground. Having received the permission to come to his house and take the girl with him, Arseny goes there, breaks the lock on the door of the room which nobody has entered for years and finds a heap of bones on the bed where he once had sex with Orsha's daughter. Grief-stricken, Arseny laments at length about his cruel fate and leaves.

== Critical reception ==
The poem was praised by Vissarion Belinsky who admired the character of Arseny, a rebel, defying both his master and the church. The critic admitted the poem was far from perfect but considered it "more precious than many mature, artfully executed works."
