= Menschen und Leidenschaften =

Play by Mikhail Lermontov

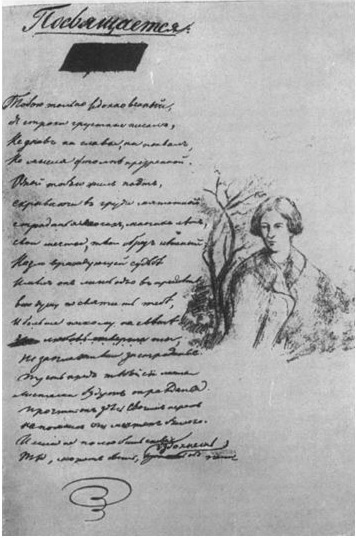
- First page autograph
- Written by: Mikhail Lermontov
- Characters: Yuri Volin; Nikolai Volin; Lyubov, his daughter Marfa Gromova, Yuri's grandma
- Original language: Russian
- Subject: Family conflict unhappy love
- Genre: Romantic drama
- Setting: Provincial Russia; Gromova's estate

Premiere
- Date premiered: January 28, 1948
- Place premiered: Abakan, Khakassia, USSR

Menschen und Leidenschaften (Russian: Люди и страсти, English: People and Passions) is an early drama by Mikhail Lermontov, written in 1830 and first published in Saint Petersburg in 1880 by Pyotr Yefremov, as part of the compilation Early Dramas by Lermontov.

== Plot summary ==
Young Yuri Volin has to make a difficult choice between staying with his rich, overprotective grandmother and departing to Germany with his financially struggling father. Yuri is passionately in love with one of his two cousins, Lyubov, who loves him too.

The scheming housemaid Darya has her own recipe for making the boy stay at home and spreads some vile rumours about him. Yuri's uncle finds out about his feelings and is outraged with the idea of two cousins being in love. As a result of Darya's machinations, the father curses Yuri, whom he believes to be treacherous and ungrateful. Yuri witnesses Lyubov's clandestine conversation with Zarutsky and mistakenly construes it as a sign of her infidelity. He first challenges his hussar friend to a duel, then commits suicide.

== Background ==
Lermontov spent his childhood years with his grandmother Yelizaveta Arsenyeva and only on several occasions was allowed to see his father Yuri. His autobiographical second drama (which followed The Spanyards, 1830) deals with the bitter family feud which by the late 1820s had come to a head. Still, while the plotline is based on real facts (archive documents corroborate this), similarities between characters and their prototypes are far from obvious. Grandmother Gromova is portrayed here as an egotistic 80-year-old religious hypocrite, which Arsenyeva wasn't.

The poem features a dedication (a 20-line verse, starting with the words: "Inspired by you only / I was writing these sad lines...") but the addressee of it remained unknown. Her hand-written name on the first page autograph had been blackened out, with only a drawing of a girl's face and a bare little tree left. Two possible candidates have been suggested, a distant cousin Anna Stolypina and Yekaterina Sushkova, but no conclusive evidence has been put forward to back either claim.

According to critic N.A. Lyubovich, stylistically Menschen und Leidenschaften is an amalgam of the 18th-century realistic French comedy and the German drama of the Sturm und Drang period, with Yuri Volin's passionate rhetoric reminding monologues from early Friedrich Schiller's work. Some critics noted similarities with Vissarion Belinsky drama Dmitry Kalinin (1830-1831), both protagonists professing ideas which were popular with the Russian student circles of the time, including those of Saint-Simon, expressed in his Nouveau Christianisme (1825).

According to critic N.M. Vladimirskaya, Yuri Volin is not so much a self-portrait, as the young author's attempt to draw a psychological portrait of his generation, as he saw it, stricken by turmoil and depression which set after the 1825 Decembrist revolt. In many ways Yuri Volin reminds the protagonist of Lermontov's poems of the time, like "Solitude", "The Storm", "1830. July the 15th", a young man who is lonely, detached and disillusioned. Here the 'Byronic hero', though, is acting in a domestic setting.

Arsenyeva's will in its final part is similar to the document quoted in the play. The same is true for Lermontov's father Yuri's 1831 will, which read: "You must be aware of the reasons for us two having been driven apart and I am sure you won't blame me for that. I only wanted to make sure that your fortune wouldn't be taken away from you, even if I myself suffered the most considerable loss." Zarutsky's prototype might have been Lermontov's friend and relative Alexey 'Mongo' Stolypin. Housemaid Darya Grigoryevna Sokolova (née Kurtina) and servant Andrey Ivanovich Sokolov (here - Ivan) were real people too, although the extent to which the former had been responsible for the boy's troubles in reality remained unclear.

Lermontov's memories of his two years spent in the Moscow University's boarding school informed fragments of this drama, too; some remarks hint at the 'free-thinking' atmosphere that he'd enjoyed there and also at a certain conflict with the authorities which might have provided the reason for his leaving the school. Most of the sources, though, cite a more trivial cause for Lermontov's departure: the elitist boarding-school was to be transformed into an ordinary gymnasium and many parents chose to withdraw their children from what they saw now as a downgraded school.
