= Cossack Lullaby =

1838 cradle song by Mikhail Lermontov

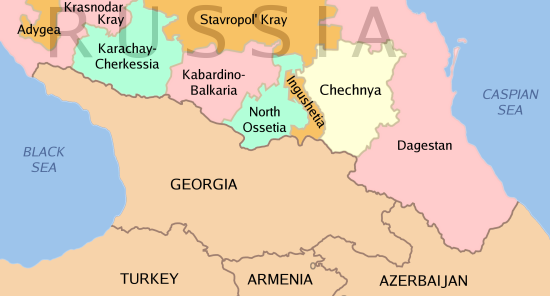
The Regions of North Caucasus

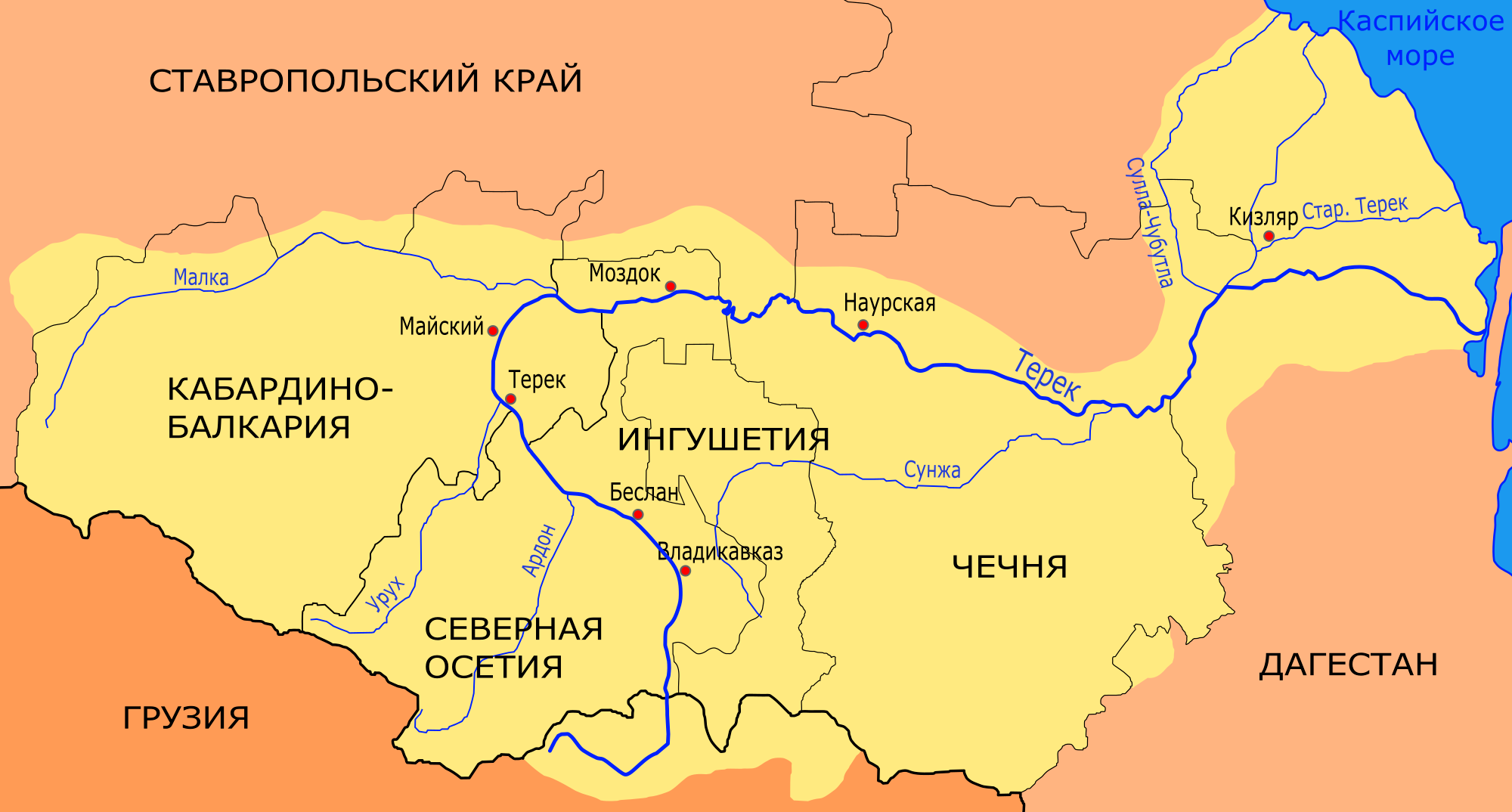
The drainage basin of the Terek River

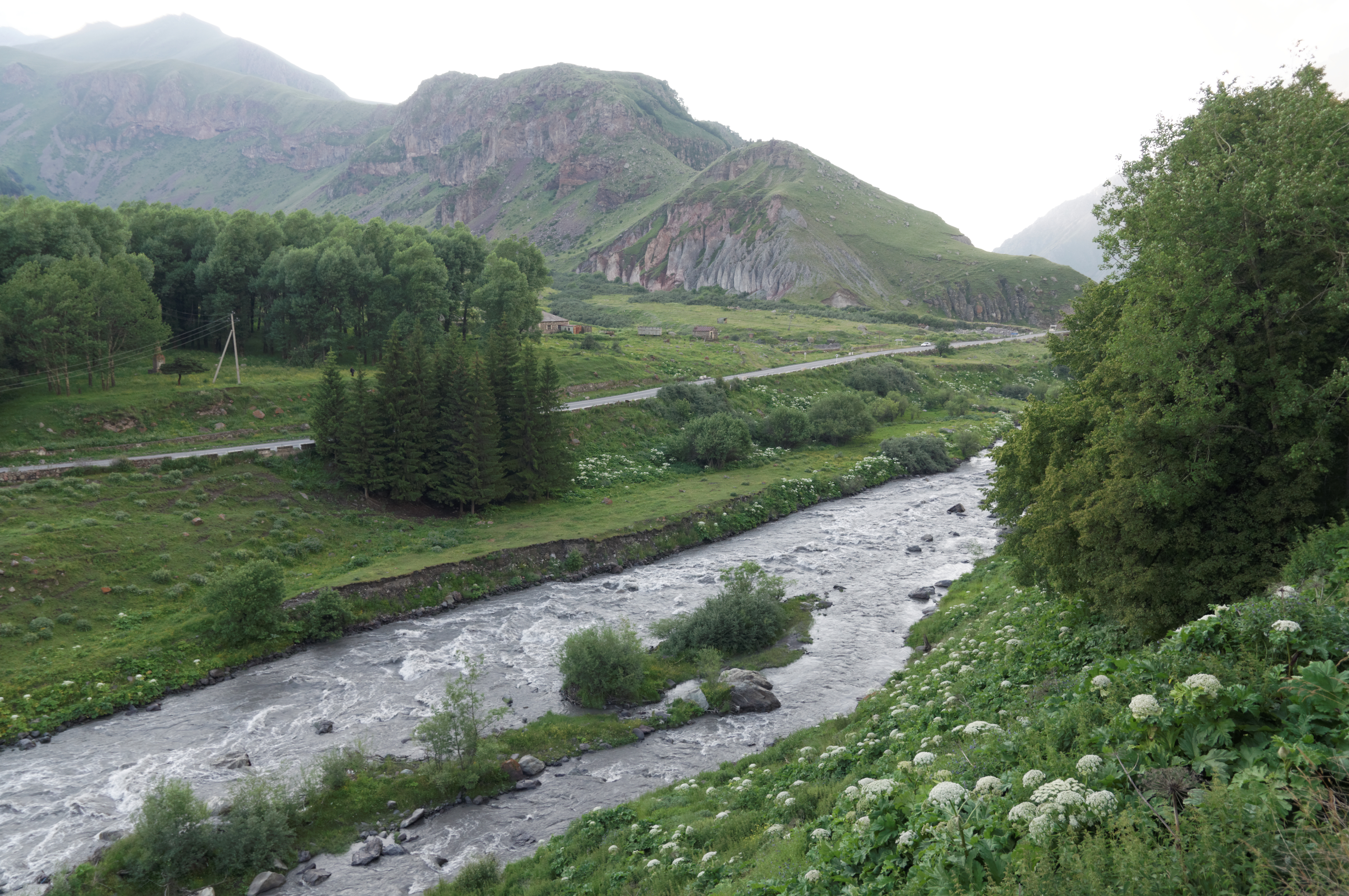
The Terek River

"The Cossack Lullaby" (Russian: Казачья колыбельная песня, romanized: Kazachya kolybelnaya pesnya) is a cradle song that Russian writer Mikhail Lermontov wrote in 1838 during his exile in Caucasus.

== Background ==
In 1837, Alexandr Pushkin had a duel with Georges d'Anthes and two days later died. Mikhail Lermontov, who had adored Pushkin, wrote a poem entitled the Death of the Poet and lamented that he fell as a victim of the aristocracy surrounding the Czar. He was immediately exiled to the Caucasus.

While in Caucasus, he heard an old Terek Cossack woman sing a cradle song, which he transcribed as the Cossack Lullaby. At that time, the Terek Cossacks defended Russia's southern border against the Chechens. Lermontov is said to have actually put the song in music in Voronezh on his way to Saint Petersburg. The song was later sent to Saint Petersburg and Moscow and became popular.

== Words and translation ==
The song has six stanzas, of which two are described below with a direct English translation.

Original text (in Russian)

Спи, младенец мой прекрасный,
Баюшки-баю.
Тихо смотрит месяц ясный
В колыбель твою.
Стану сказывать я сказки,
Песенку спою;
Ты ж дремли, закрывши глазки,
Баюшки-баю.

По камням струится Терек,
Плещет мутный вал;
Злой чечен ползет на берег,
Точит свой кинжал;
Но отец твой старый воин,
Закален в бою:
Спи, малютка, будь спокоен,
Баюшки-баю.

Transliteration

Spi, mladenec moj prekrasnyj,
Bajuški-baju.
Tiho smotrit mesjac jasnyj
V kolybelʹ tvoju.
Stanu skazyvatʹ ja skazki,
Pesenku spoju;
Ty ž dremli, zakryvši glazki,
Bajuški-baju.
Po kamnjam struitsja Terek,
Pleŝet mutnyj val;
Zloj čečen polzet na bereg,
Točit svoj kinžal;
No otec tvoj staryj voin,
Zakalen v boju:
Spi, maljutka, budʹ spokoen,
Bajuški-baju.

Direct translation

Sleep, baby, my dearest,
Hushabye, a-bye.
Quietly the bright moon
Is looking at you in the cradle.
I will start telling a story,
Sing a song;
You dream a dream, closing the eyes,
Hushabye, a-bye.

Over the rocky bed flows the Terek River,
And splashes the dark waves;
A sly Chechen crawls over the bank,
Sharpening his dagger;
But your father is an experienced warrior
Trained in battles:
Sleep, my little one, be peaceful,
Lullaby, a-bye.

== See also ==
- Mikhail Lermontov's first exile
- Osetia
