= No, I'm not Byron =

Poem by Mikhail Lermontov

"No, I'm not Byron" (Russian: Нет, я не Байрон, romanized: Net, ya ne Bayron) is a poem written by the Russian poet Mikhail Lermontov in 1832. It was first published in the journal Biblioteka Dlya Chteniya in 1845, four years after Lermontov's death.

== Text ==
Original Russian

Нет, я не Байрон, я другой,
Ещё неведомый избранник,
Как он, гонимый миром странник,
Но только с русскою душой.
Я раньше начал, кончу ране,
Мой ум немного совершит;
В душе моей, как в океане,
Надежд разбитых груз лежит.
Кто может, океан угрюмый,
Твои изведать тайны? Кто
Толпе мои расскажет думы?
Я — или Бог — или никто!

Transliteration

Net, ya ne Bayron, ya drugoy,
Yeshchyo nevedomy izbrannik,
Kak on, gonimy mirom strannik,
No tolko s russkoyu dushoy.
Ya ranshe nachal, konchu rane,
Moy um nemnogo sovershit;
V dushe moyey, kak v okeane,
Nadezhd razbitykh gruz lezhit.
Kto mozhet, okean ugryumy,
Tvoi izvedat tayny? Kto
Tolpe moi rasskazhet dumy?
Ya — ili Bog — ili nikto!

Literal translation

No, I am not Byron, I am another,
Another unknown chosen one,
Like him, a wanderer persecuted by the world,
Just with a Russian soul.
I began earlier, I will finish earlier,
My mind will accomplish little;
In my soul, as in the ocean,
The weight of broken hopes lies.
Who, gloomy ocean, can
Know your secrets? Who
Will tell the crowd my thoughts?
Either me, or God, or nobody at all!
