= The Tambov Treasurer's Wife =

Poem by Mikhail Lermontov

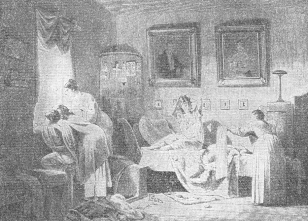
Hot featherbed's forgotten... M.Rashevsky's engraving (based on Mikhail Klodt's drawing). 1874

Tambov Treasurer's Wife (Russian: Тамбовская казначейша, romanized: Tambovskaya kaznacheysha) is a poem by Mikhail Lermontov, written and published by Sovremennik in 1838.

== Summary ==
A visiting uhlan falls in love with the 18-year-old wife of the old Tambov's treasurer and, after several attempts to woo her, 'wins' her from her husband in the game of cards.

== History ==
On February 15, 1838, Lermontov informed M.A.Lopukhina (writing in French): "I've been to Zhukovsky and, following his request, brought him Tambov Teasurer's Wife. He took it to Vyazemsky, they read it together and liked it a lot. It will be printed in the next Sovremennik issue." Since Lermontov speaks of the poem as if it had already been read by Lopukhina, it must have been finished by mid-January, when he left Moscow.

The poem (signed "-v") was published in No.3 issue of Sovremennik, with both editorial (by Zhukovsky) and censorial cuts. The title was curtailed to just Kaznatcheysha (A Treasurer's Wife). The manuscript of the poem has been lost. None of the omitted lines has been restored since.

The way the poem was treated outraged Lermontov. Ivan Panayev remembered: "...I found Lermontov at Krayevsky's greatly agitated. He [Lermontov] held a thin pink book of Sovremennik in his hands showing the intention to tear it apart, but Krayevsky wouldn't let him. "It's Devil knows what! - Lermontov was shouting, shaking the journal. - Is it permissible at all to do such things? That's unbelievable!" Then he sat at the table, took a large red pencil and on the sleeve of the journal where his Treasurer's Wife was published, drew some sort of caricature."
