= Princess Ligovskaya =

Unfinished novel by Mikhail Lermontov

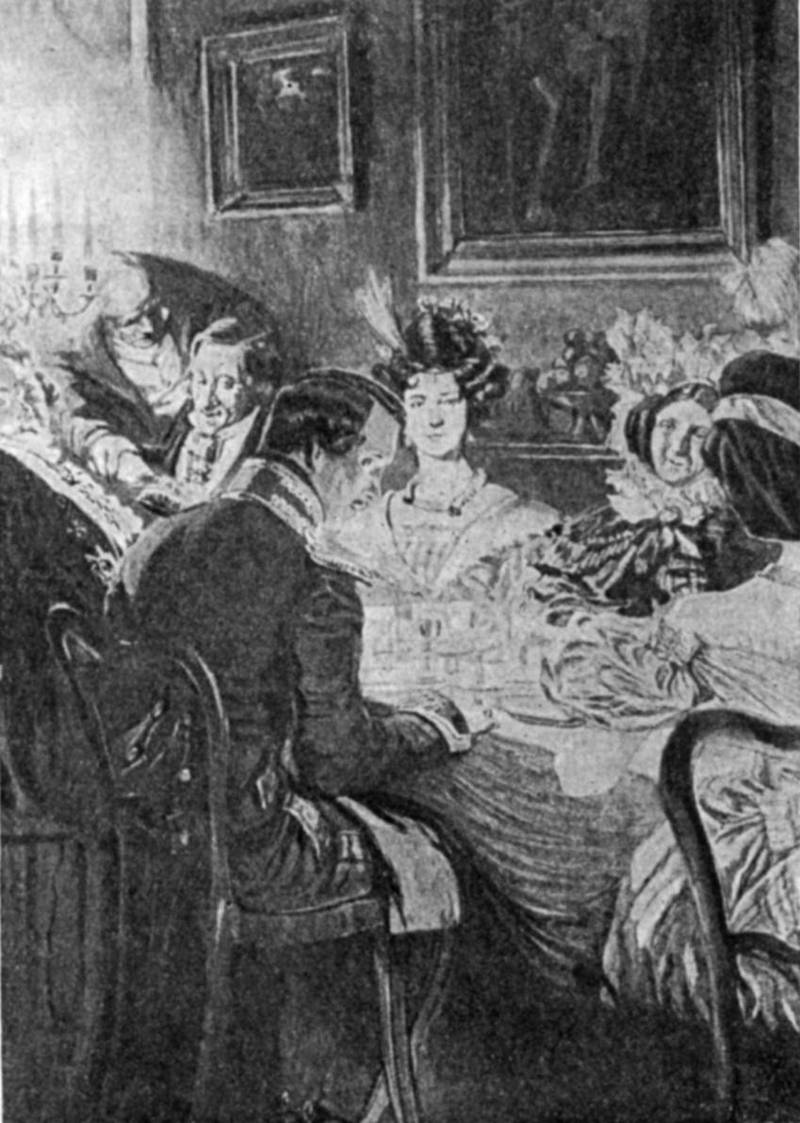
- Dinner at the Pechyorins. 1914 Illustration by Dmitry Kardovsky
- Author: Mikhail Lermontov
- Original title: Княгиня Лиговская
- Language: Russian
- Genre: Romanticism, Realism
- Publication date: 1882
- Publication place: Russian Empire
- Media type: Print (Paperback & Hardback)
- Preceded by: Two Brothers (1836)
- Followed by: A Hero of Our Time (1840)

Princess Ligovskaya (Russian: Княгиня Лиговская) is an unfinished novel by Mikhail Lermontov started in 1836 and first published in No.1, January 1882 issue of Russky Vestnik.

== Synopsis ==
The Guards officer Pechorin meets his former beau Vera Ligovskaya (now married to a pompous and vain man, Prince Ligovskoy), finds his love is not entirely dead and sees she is struggling with similar feelings. A parallel sub-plot deals with the hero's conflict with Krasinsky, a minor official from an impoverished noble family.

== History ==
Lermontov started the novel in 1836 soon after he finished Two Brothers. He was forced to abruptly abandon it 1837 after being arrested for his controversial poem "Death of the Poet", and later opted against finishing it. On June 8, 1838, in a letter to his friend Svyatoslav Rayevsky he wrote: "The novel that we've started stalked and will hardly get another start, for the circumstances that formed its background changed, and you know, I won't go against the truth." Rayevsky was by no means a co-author: he was only writing down what Lermontov was dictating him.

Most of the characters of Princess Ligovskaya had their real prototypes. Varvara Lopukhina (whom Lermontov was in love with) featured as Vera, her husband Nikolai Bakhmetyev as Prince Ligovskoy. In Elizaveta Negurova the author portrayed Yekaterina Sushkova, whom he's had an uneasy relationship with, described in full detail in his 1835 letter to cousin Alexandra Vereshchagina.

Critics noticed that Pechorin bears strong resemblance to Lermontov. On the other hand, there are obvious parallels to Alexander Pushkin's Yevgeny Onegin (both heroes' second names are derived from the names of rivers Pechora and Onega).
