= Pyotr Yefremov =

Russian literary historian

Pyotr Alexandrovich Yefremov
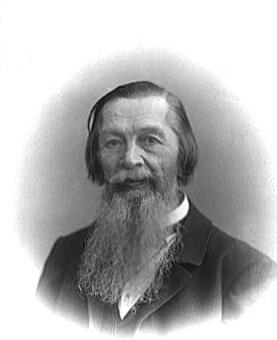
- Pyotr Yefremov in the 1890s
- Born: Pyotr Alexandrovich Yefremov; Пётр Александрович Ефремов; November 17, 1830; Moscow, Russian Empire
- Died: January 8, 1908 (aged 77); Saint Petersburg, Russian Empire
- Occupations: publisher editor essayist literary historian
- Years active: 1857s - 1900s

Pyotr Alexandrovich Yefremov (Russian: Пётр Александрович Ефремов; November 17, 1830 (O.S., 2) in Moscow, Russian Empire – January 8, 1908 [O.S. December 26, 1907] in Saint Petersburg, Russian Empire) was a Russian literary historian, publisher, editor and essayist whose works were published regularly by Sovremennik (where he debuted in 1857), Otechestvennye Zapiski, Russky Arkhiv, Russkaya Starina, Istorichesky Vestnik, newspapers Golos, Novoye Vremya, Russkiye Vedomosti. In 1864-1865 he edited the Knizhny Vestnik (The Books Herald) magazine. Praised as one of the most competent literary scholars of the 19th century, Pyotr Yefremov compiled, edited and published the series of The Works of: Denis Fonvizin (1866), Valerian Maykov (1867), Antiochus Kantemir (1867-1868), Vladimir Lukin (1868), Bogdan Yelchaninov (1868), Alexander Radishchev (1872, Saint Petersburg; banned at the time), Kondraty Ryleyev (1872, 1874), Mikhail Lermontov (1873, 1880, 1887, 1889, also the Early Dramas compilation, 1880), Vasily Zhukovsky (1878, 1885), Alexander Pushkin (1880, 1882, 1905, plus two Yevgeny Onegin editions, 1874, 1882), Alexander Polezhayev (1889). He is credited with having discovered, published and written analytical essays on numerous hitherto unknown autographs by classics like Pushkin, Ryleyev, Lermontov, Radishchev, Fonvizin, Zhukovsky.

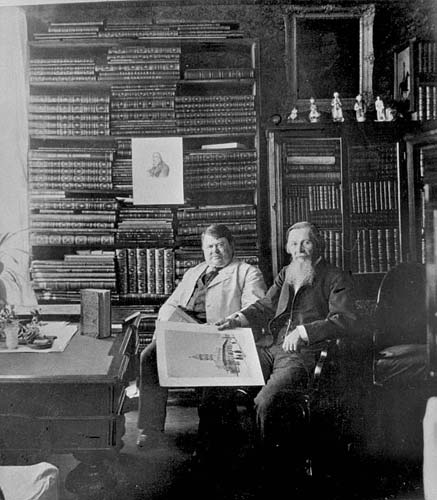
Pyotr Alexandrovich Yefremov (right) in the 1890s
