= Pavel Viskovatov =

Russian literary historian

Pavel Alexandrovich Viskovatov
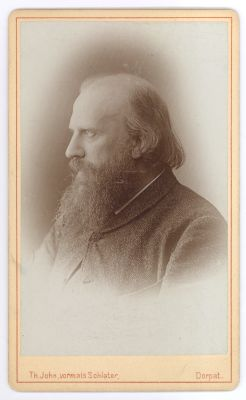
- 1892 photo
- Born: Павел Александрович Висковатов; 6 December 1842; Saint Petersburg, Russian Empire
- Died: 29 April 1905 (aged 62); Saint Petersburg, Russian Empire
- Occupations: literary historian pedagogue essayist
- Years active: 1865 - early 1900s

Pavel Alexandrovich Viskovatov (Russian: Па′вел Алекса′ндрович Вискова′тов, also: Висковатый, Viskovatyi; 6 December 1842 in Saint Petersburg, Russian Empire – 29 April 1905 in Saint Petersburg) was a Russian historian of literature, editor, pedagogue and librettist (his were the lyrics to Anton Rubinstein's opera The Demon, based on Mikhail Lermontov's poem of the same name). The Dorpat University professor of Russian language and literature (since 1873), Viskovatov devoted himself to re-discovering, compiling, and studying the vast and dispersed Lermontov's legacy. He prepared and in 1891 published in Saint Petersburg the first ever edition of The Works of Mikhail Lermontov. Featured here (in volume VI) the first ever comprehensive academic biography written by Viskovatov, has been used as blueprint by all the subsequent Russian biographers ever since.
