= Ruslan and Ludmila =

1820 poem by Alexander Pushkin

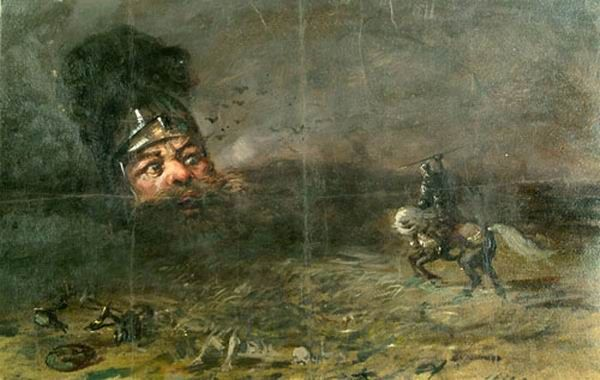
Ruslan confronts the head, by Nikolai Ge

Ruslan and Ludmila (pre-reform Russian: Русла́нъ и Людми́ла; post-reform Russian: Русла́н и Людми́ла, romanized: Ruslán i Lyudmíla) is a poem by Alexander Pushkin, published in 1820. Written as an epic literary fairy tale consisting of a dedication (посвящение), six "cantos" (песни), and an epilogue (эпилог), it tells the story of the abduction of Ludmila, the daughter of Prince Vladimir of the Kievan Rus' (reigned 980–1015), by an evil wizard and the attempt by the brave knight Ruslan to find and rescue her.

== Origin ==
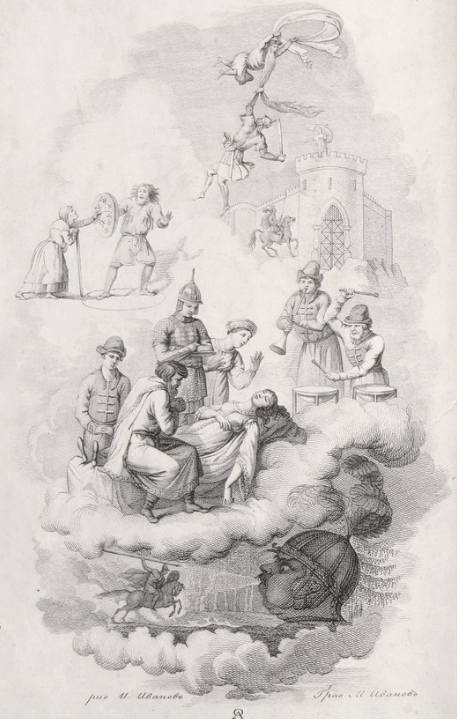
Frontispiece of the 1st edition of 1820

Pushkin began writing the poem in 1817, while attending the Imperial Lyceum at Tsarskoye Selo. He based it on Russian folktales he had heard as a child. Before it was published in 1820, Pushkin was exiled to the south of Russia for political ideas he had expressed in other works such as his "Ode to Liberty" (вольность). A slightly revised edition was published in 1828.

== Synopsis ==
=== Dedication ===
Pushkin dedicates the poem to unnamed young beauties, the "queens of my soul" (души моей царицы dushi mojej tsaritsy), and states that his reward is the hope that some lovesick girl will read the poem in secret.

=== Song 1 ===
"У лукоморья дуб зеленый..."
Excerpt from "Ruslan and Ludmila"

In a brief prologue, the narrator of the story describes a green oak by the sea, on which a learned cat walks back and forth on a gold chain. When the cat walks to the right, he sings – to the left he tells stories. In this magical place, fairy tales come alive, including those common in Russian folktales such as a hut on hen's legs (избушка на курьих ножках), Baba Yaga (Баба-Яга) and King Koschei (царь Кащей), and fairy tales that Pushkin himself wrote, including the 33 warriors from The Tale of Tsar Saltan. The narrator tells us he has been to this magical place and the cat has told the narrator these stories, including the following story.

The story opens with a feast given by Prince Vladimir (Владимир) to celebrate the marriage of his daughter, Ludmila, to the bold warrior Ruslan. Among the guests are Ruslan's jealous rivals, the bold warrior Rogday (Рогдай), the boastful Farlaf (Фарлаф), and the young Khazar Khan Ratmir (Ратмир).

On their wedding night, as Ruslan prepares to consummate the marriage, a strange presence fills the bedroom, accompanied by thunder and lightning. Ruslan finds that his bride has mysteriously vanished.

On hearing of Ludmila's disappearance, the angered Vladimir annuls the marriage and promises his daughter's hand to whoever is able to return her safely. Ruslan and his three rivals set off on horseback.

Ruslan encounters an old man in a cavern who tells him that Ludmila had been abducted by the sorcerer Chernomor (Черномор), but hurries to add it is extremely unlikely he damaged her honor – for all of his magical abilities, Chernomor is powerless before the ravages of old age. The old man himself is a Finn who tells the story of how he had fallen in love with a beautiful young maiden, Naina (Наина), who spurned his attention. In order to win her love he tried to become a glorious warrior, but when she rejected him, spent years learning the magical arts instead. He finally cast a spell to win Naina's love, only to find that she herself was actually an old crone. After he rejected her, she became bent on revenge. Now that the Finn has helped Ruslan, Naina will hate him as well.

=== Song 2 ===
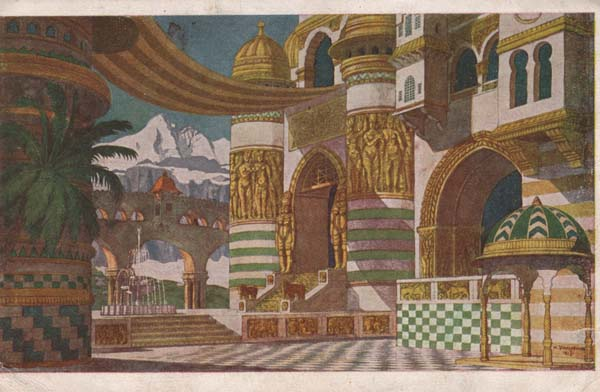
1905 set design for the opera by Ivan Bilibin

(This and each of the remaining songs begin with an "editorial comment" by the author. These comments often evoke classical mythology and sometimes contain contemporary references.)

Rogday decides to abandon the quest for Ludmila and to find and kill Ruslan instead. Seeing a rider, he attacks, only to find it is Farlaf and not Ruslan, and leaves him shaken but alive. An old woman appears and points Rogday to the direction in which to find Ruslan. She then advises Farlaf to return to Kiev (Киев) to await his trophy.

Ruslan is challenged by another rider and the story turns briefly to Ludmila's fate.

She finds herself in a lavish chamber where three maidens are ready to fulfill her every desire. Opening the chamber door, she discovers a marvelous garden to rival Solomon's. However, she feels empty without Ruslan.

She is startled by a hunchbacked dwarf approaching her, carried by ten manservants. She lashes out and he tumbles to the ground, tripping over his long beard. It is the wizard Chernomor, who leaves his hat as he flees.

Meanwhile, Ruslan defeats the challenger, Rogday, and leaves him to drown in the Dnieper (Днепр).

=== Song 3 ===
Chernomor is visited by a flying dragon who turns out to be Naina, pledging her alliance in defeating the Finn. Encouraged, he decides to go to Ludmila and make advances toward her, but she is nowhere to be found. She had tried on the wizard's hat and found that she could vanish and reappear at will by varying its position on her head.

As Ruslan rides on, he finds himself in the midst of a deserted battlefield, strewn with bones, dead horses, and war relics. He momentarily mourns his own fate, then realizes it is an opportunity to arm himself. His weapon and armor are lost in the battle with Rogday. He leaves with a lance, helmet, coat of armor, and a battle horn. He could not, however, find a suitable sword.

Continuing, he finds his path blocked by a huge hill emitting strange sounds. Closer inspection reveals it to be a giant slumbering human head. Ruslan awakens the head, which becomes angered and begins to taunt him. It sticks out its tongue. Ruslan seizes the opportunity and thrusts his lance into the tongue. Then, he gives it a slap powerful enough to knock it off its place. Where it once stood, Ruslan finds a shining sword suitable for a bogatyr. As Ruslan prepares to attack with the sword, the head pleads for mercy.

The head tells his story. He was once a mighty warrior, the brother of Chernomor, who envied him. Chernomor's magic power lay in his beard, and he told his brother that they must secure the sword, which had the power to kill both of them – Chernomor, by cutting his beard, the brother, by severing his head. They set off in quest of the sword, but then disputed to whom it should belong once they found it. Chernomor proposed that they both put their heads to the ground and the sword would go to the one who first heard a sound. Instead, he used the sword to sever his brother's head, which magically remained alive.

The head tells Ruslan that he bears no grudge and would be grateful if Ruslan uses the sword to defeat Chernomor.

=== Song 4 ===
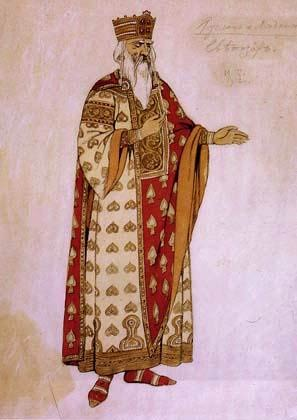
1905 costume design by Bilibin

Ratmir is interrupted in his journey by a young maiden who beckons him into a castle, where he finds himself enveloped in luxury. He soon forgets Ludmila. Ludmila eludes Chernomor's henchmen by remaining invisible, but then is tricked by the wizard into revealing herself when he takes the form of Ruslan and calls to her in his voice. He is thwarted by the sound of a horn and hurries off, leaving his hat behind.

=== Song 5 ===
Chernomor confronts Ruslan, who has arrived at the wizard's lair. They trade blows, and Chernomor flies off, with Ruslan holding onto his beard. For three days they fly, with Ruslan snipping away at the beard, until the bedraggled wizard pleads for mercy and agrees to take Ruslan to Ludmila. Ruslan searches the palace and wanders into the garden, all the time calling for Ludmila, who remains hidden. Finally, a chance thrust of his flailing sword knocks the hat from her head. However, his lover is in a trance and does not hear him calling. He hears the Finn's voice from a distance telling him to return Ludmila to Kiev, where she will awaken.

Ruslan sets off, carrying his bride and Chernomor. He encounters the head, who, content that he has been avenged, dies in peace.

Ruslan comes to rest at a stream and is met by a fisherman, who turns out to be the Khan Ratmir. He explains that he has met his true love and no longer yearns for Ludmila. The two part as friends.

Naina appears to Farlaf and tells him that his hour has arrived. He saddles up and rides off, finding Ruslan encamped and thrusting his sword into him as he sleeps. As Farlaf rides off with his prey, Ruslan lies unconscious and finally succumbs to his injuries.

=== Song 6 ===
Chernomor awakens and is joyful to see Ruslan lying dead. Farlaf returns Ludmila to Vladimir, whose initial happiness soon turns to mourning as he finds that she cannot be awakened from her deep slumber. Farlaf is sad and remorseful. To make matters even worse, the city of Kiev is under siege.

The Finn finds Ruslan and resurrects him with magical waters. He gives Ruslan a ring which will break Ludmila's spell, but tells him that he must first save the city from its attackers. Ruslan returns to Kiev, Chernomor still in tow, and leads the city's warriors to victory.

Ruslan touches Ludmila's face with the ring and she awakens. Vladimir gives the couple his blessing. Ruslan forgives both Farlaf and Chernomor.

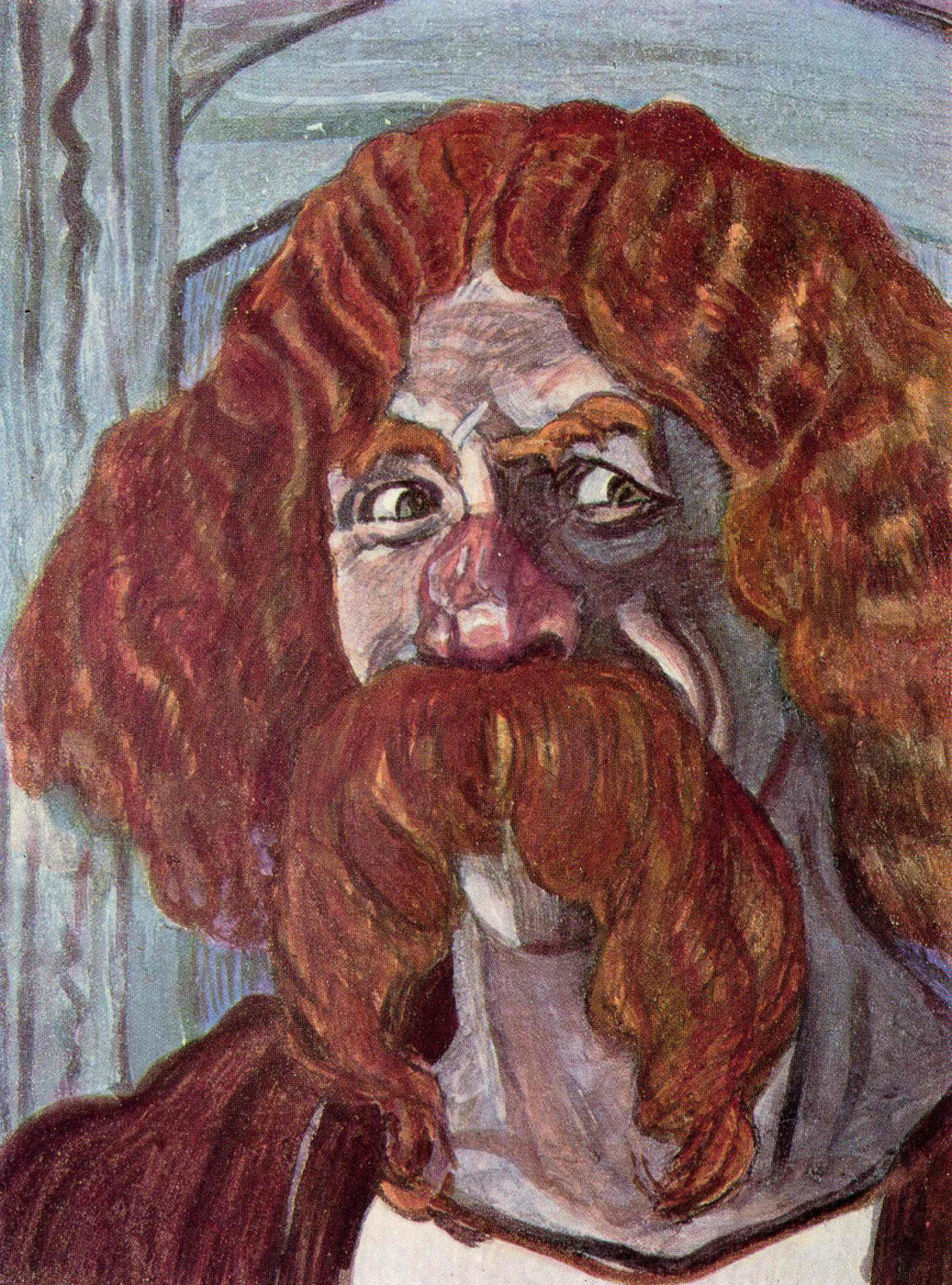
Chaliapin as Farlaf, by Alexander Golovin

=== Epilogue ===
Another editorial comment by the author, who bemoans better days gone by.

== Historical basis ==
Some of the events and names in the poem have a historical basis. The story takes place during the time Kiev (the capital of modern Ukraine) was the capital of the East Slavic state Rus'. Vladimir the Great ruled this state from 980 to 1015.

The name Ruslan is adapted from Yeruslan Lazarevich, who appears in earlier Russian tales and is mentioned in Pushkin's The Moor of Peter the Great. Rogday and Farlaf are mentioned in Nikolay Karamzin's History of the Russian State (История государства Российского).

The Pechenegs, mentioned in Song 6, besieged the city of Kiev in 968, and again (in a date which would make sense in a possible timeline of the poem) in 997. The descriptions of battle are historically accurate with regard to weapons and tactics used in the 10th century.

== Adaptations ==
The poem was the basis of an opera of the same name composed by Mikhail Glinka between 1837 and 1842.

A feature film based on the poem was produced in the Soviet Union in 1972, directed by Aleksandr Ptushko and starring Valeri Kozinets and Natalya Petrova as the title characters. Other film versions include a 1915 silent produced by the Russian production company Khanzhonkov, directed by Ladislas Starevich, and a 1996 made-for-TV version based on Glinka's opera, directed by Hans Hulscher and produced by NHK. As well, the 1938 black and white film of the same name. Lines from the prologue of this poem are repetitively recited by the character Masha in the play Three Sisters by Anton Chekhov. The 2018 Ukrainian film The Stolen Princess: Ruslan and Ludmila by Animagrad is a 3D animated adaptation of the poem.

References to the tale are made in Monday Begins on Saturday by Arkady and Boris Strugatsky: in the first part of the book Sasha stays in an old house "by the sea" (actually in an alleyway called Curving Seashore Street) with a green oak in the garden. The house is revealed to be chicken-legged hut of Baba Yaga (who is called Naina by the characters in the book). There is a well-learned cat who paces to and fro under the tree, trying to recount stories and songs but who is unable to remember more than the first few lines of each.

The 1992 video game Tetris Classic features illustrations depicting scenes from the story.
