= Mozart and Salieri (opera) =

Opera by Nikolai Rimsky-Korsakov

- Opera by Nikolai Rimsky-Korsakov
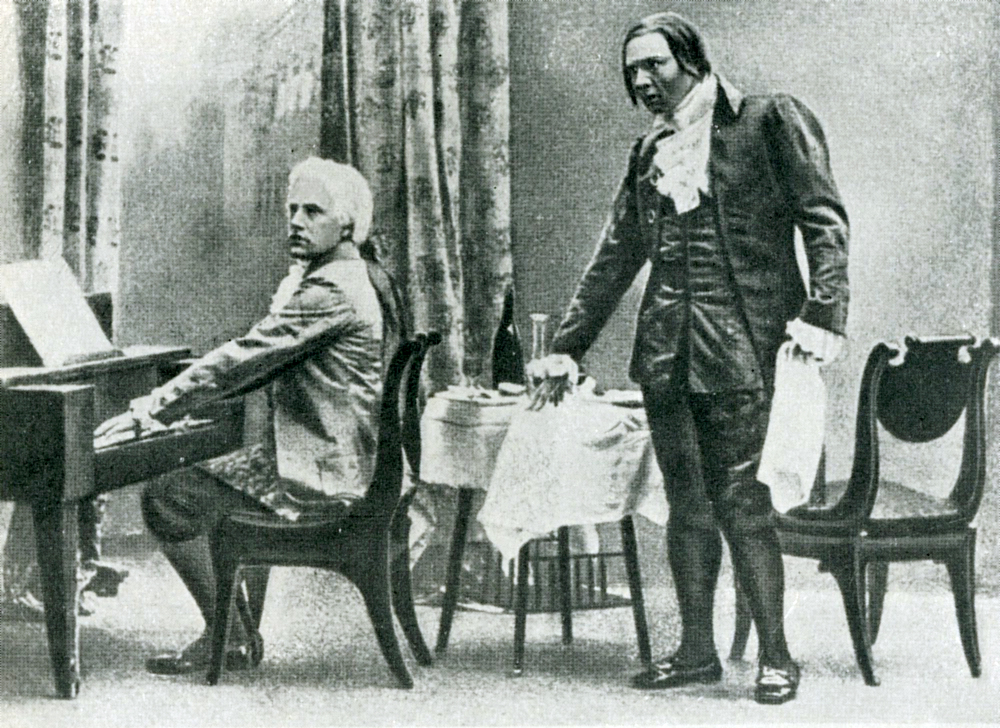
- Vasiliy Shkafer as Mozart and Fyodor Shalyapin as Salieri in the premiere
- Native title: Russian: Моцарт и Сальери
- Language: Russian
- Based on: Mozart and Salieri by Alexander Pushkin
- Premiere: 1898; Solodovnikov Theater, Moscow

Mozart and Salieri (Russian: Моцарт и Сальери, romanized: Motsart i Salyeri) is a one-act opera in two scenes by Nikolai Rimsky-Korsakov, written in 1897 to a Russian libretto taken almost verbatim from Alexander Pushkin's 1830 verse drama of the same name.

The story follows the apocryphal legend that Antonio Salieri poisoned Wolfgang Amadeus Mozart out of jealousy over the latter's music. Rimsky-Korsakov incorporated quotations from Mozart's Requiem and Don Giovanni into the score. Richard Taruskin has placed this opera in the historical context of the development of the realistic tradition in Russian opera.

== Performance history ==
The first performance took place at the Solodovnikov Theater in Moscow, presented by the Moscow Private Russian Opera, Moscow on 7 December 1898 (O.S. 25 November). The conductor was Iosif Truffi and scenic designer was Mikhail Vrubel.

Feodor Chaliapin, who originated the role of Salieri, claimed to have often sung the piece as a monodrama, as the role of Mozart goes no higher than g and was within his range.

The first UK performance in the United Kingdom was presented on 11 October 1927, again with 1948, Samuil Samosud (conductor), Stanislavsky and Nemirovich-Danchenko Theatre, Sergey Lemeshev (Mozart), Alexander Pirogov (Salieri) as Salieri, while the first U.S. one took place in Forest Park, Pennsylvania, in 1933.

A recent UK revival took place in August 2016 at the 10th Grimeborn Festival at Arcola Theatre in London; the stage director was Pamela Schermann and musical director was Andrew Charity.

== Roles ==
Role	Voice type	Premiere cast Moscow, 7 December 1898 (Conductor: Iosif Truffi)
Mozart	tenor	Vasily Shkafer
Salieri	baritone	Fyodor Shalyapin
A blind fiddler	silent role	
Offstage chorus: sings a few bars of Mozart's Requiem Mass in the second scene.

== Synopsis ==
Time: End of the 18th century Place: Vienna, Austria

=== Scene 1 ===
Salieri enjoys high social position as a composer, and has dedicated himself to the service of his art. Secretly, however, he is jealous of Mozart's works because he recognizes their superior quality, especially given what he sees as the "idle" character of Mozart. Salieri invites Mozart to dinner and plans to poison him.

=== Scene 2 ===
Mozart and Salieri are dining at an inn. Mozart is troubled by his work on his Requiem, which a stranger in black commissioned from him. Mozart recalls Salieri's collaboration with Pierre Beaumarchais and asks if it could be true that Beaumarchais once poisoned someone, for genius and criminality are surely incompatible. Salieri then surreptitiously pours poison into Mozart's drink. Mozart begins to play at the keyboard, as Salieri begins to cry. Mozart sees this, but Salieri urges Mozart to continue. Mozart begins to feel ill, and leaves. Salieri ends the opera pondering Mozart's belief that a genius could not murder: did not Michelangelo kill for his commissions at the Vatican, or were those idle rumors?

== Recordings ==
Audio recordings (Mainly studio recordings) Source: www.operadis-opera-discography.org.uk Motsart i Salyeri (Russian)

- 1927, Albert Coates (conductor), London Symphony Orchestra, Theodore Ritch (Mozart), Feodor Chaliapin (Salieri), excerpts from the live performance given at the Royal Albert Hall, London, 11 October 1927
- 1948, Samuil Samosud (conductor), Stanislavsky and Nemirovich-Danchenko Theatre, Sergey Lemeshev (Mozart), Alexander Pirogov (Salieri)
- 1951, Samuil Samosud (conductor), USSR Radio Orchestra and Chorus, Ivan Kozlovsky (Mozart), Mark Reizen (Salieri)
- 1974, Stoyan Angelov (conductor), Bulgarian Radio-Television Symphony Orchestra, Svetoslav Obretenov Chorus, Avram Andreev (Mozart), Pavel Gerdzhikov (Salieri), Teodor Moussev (piano), Raina Manolova (violin)
- 1986, Mark Ermler (conductor), Bolshoy Theatre Orchestra and Chorus, Aleksandr Fedin (Mozart), Yevgeny Nesterenko (Salieri), Vera Chasovennaya (piano), Sergey Girshenko (violin)
- 1994, Yuli Turovsky (conductor), I Musici de Montréal, I Musici de Montréal Choir, Vladimir Bogachev (Mozart), Nikita Storojev (Salieri)

in German Mozart und Salieri 1982, Marek Janowski (conductor), Dresden Staatskapelle, Leipzig Radio Symphony Chorus, Peter Schreier (Mozart), Theo Adam (Salieri), Peter Rosel (piano)

=== Video ===
- VHS 1981, Live performance, Alexei Maslennikov (Mozart), Artur Eizen (Salieri), L. Novikov (Violinist), Orchestra and Chorus of the Bolshoi Theatre, Ruben Vartanian

== See also ==
- Amadeus, a 1984 film inspired by the same theme.
