= Alexander Kunitsyn =

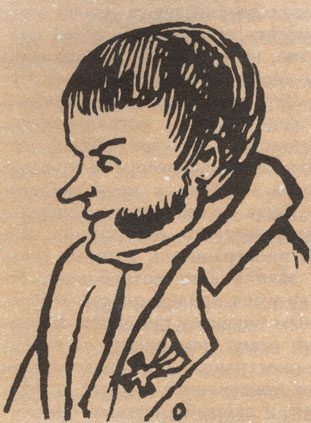
Alexander Kunitsyn by Alexey Illichevsky

Alexander Petrovich Kunitsyn (Russian: Александр Петрович Куницын; November 16 [27], 1783, Koi, Tver Province – July 1 [13], 1840, St. Petersburg) was a Russian lawyer, professor, Active State Councillor. He was a favourite teacher of the Russian poet and playwright, Alexander Pushkin.

== Biography ==
Kunitsyn was born on November 16 (27), 1783 in the family of a rural deacon. He was educated at the Main Pedagogical Institute (1803–1807); then he prepared for a professorship at the Universities of Göttingen and Heidelberg (1808–1811).

In 1811–1820, from the moment of opening of the Tsarskoye Selo Lyceum and the Noble Boarding school at the Main Pedagogical Institute, he taught moral, political and legal sciences. Since the opening of St. Petersburg University, he had been reading the same subjects in it. The success that he had among the students of the lyceum was testified by Alexander Pushkin in the poem dedicated to the Lyceum's anniversary 'October 19, 1825'.

== Career ==
The course of science taught by Kunitsyn at the Lyceum included only 12 subjects: logic, psychology, ethics, natural law, Russian civil law, criminal law, financial law, and so on. They constituted a certain unity since Professor Kunitsyn believed that "science has a perfect form only when all its provisions form an uninterrupted chain and one is explained sufficiently by the other." He also taught the basics of political economy and an overview of various social systems, and even an analysis of the vices of the serfdom. On October 23, 1811, he was awarded the Knight of the Order of Saint Vladimir IV degree. He was an author of the book 'The Natural Law' (parts I, II, St. Petersburg, 1818–1820). Kunitsyn's work was compiled under the strong influence of Rousseau and Kant. It carried the idea of the need to limit any power, both social and parental; otherwise power turns into tyranny and injustice. Power is established not for the benefit of rulers, but for the benefit of subjects and subordinates; that is why only power exercised to protect the rights and interests of the population, society and children can be recognised as lawful. Kunitsyn's book, printed in the amount of 1000 copies, was confiscated from the author and from all institutions of the Ministry of Public Education, and even the Natural law, as a science, became the subject of increased persecution until the publication of the university charter in 1835.

In 1820 he was also invited to teach at the Corps of Pages.

He was dismissed from the university in 1821. In 1828–1829, Kunitsyn, who joined the commission for the drafting of laws (the 2nd Division of His Imperial Majesty's Own Chancellery), lectured on law to the elect of theological academies preparing for the title of professor of jurisprudence. Since 1838 he had been an honorary member of St. Petersburg University. In 1840 he became a director of the Department of Spiritual Affairs.

His other works include 'Image of the interconnection of state information' (St. Petersburg, 1817) and 'Historical image of ancient legal proceedings in Russia' (permitted by censorship in 1825, but published only after Kunitsyn's death, in 1843). The last work is only a part of the extensive work which was supposed to be devoted to the history of the Russian ancient law – from the emergence of Russia to the 16th century – and reveals in the author remarkable historical and legal background and views of that time.

=== Books ===
- The natural law. – St. Petersburg, 1818. – 135 p.

== Cultural references ==
Kunitsyn is one of the characters in the novel by Yuri Tynyanov "Pushkin" (1936).

Pushchin's memoirs describe an episode in which Kunitsyn, during the opening of the Tsarskoye Selo Lyceum, in his speech in the presence of Alexander I, never mentioned the name of the emperor. Alexander I was so surprised by Kunitsyn's lack of flattery that the next day he sent him the Order of St. Vladimir.

== Bibliography ==
- Куницын, Александр Петрович (2020). Право естественное. Москва: ЛКИ. p. 10. ISBN 978-5-382-02004-4.
- Месяцослов и общий штат Российской империи на 1840. Часть первая. Собственная Его Императорского Величества канцелярия. Придворный штат. СПб: Типография при Императорской Академии наук. 1840.
- Осипов, Юрий Сергеевич (2004–2017). Большая российская энциклопедия. Москва: Большая российская энциклопедия. Archived from the original on May 16, 2022.
- Худушина, И. Ф. (2010). ru:Новая философская энциклопедия в 4 т. пред. науч.-ред. совета В. С. Стёпин. — 2-е изд., испр. и доп. Москва: Мысль.
- Руденская, М.П. (1989). Наставникам… за благо воздадим. Ленинград: Лениздат.
- Яценко, О.А. (1992). Куницыну дань сердца и вина…И в просвещении стать с веком наравне. Сборник научных трудов Всероссийского музея А. С. Пушкина. СПб. pp. 45–56.
- Яценко О. А. А. П. Куницын // Философия в Санкт-Петербурге. 1703–2003. Справочно-энциклопедическое издание. — СПб., 2003.Яценко, О.А. (2003). Философия в Санкт-Петербурге. 1703—2003. Справочно-энциклопедическое издание. СПб.
