= Zinaida Petrovna Ziberova =

German-Russian pianist (1909-?)

- Born: December 1, 1909 (age 116); Darmstadt, Kingdom of Prussia, German Empire
- Occupations: Composer, conductor, pianist

Zinaida Petrovna Ziberova (born December 1, 1909) was a pianist, conductor, and composer who was born in Darmstadt, Germany, and lived most of her life in Rostov-on-Don, Russia. Ziberova moved to Rostov-on-Don in 1925, where she attended music school and studied piano with A. Alper, graduating in 1928. She worked as a pianist in nightclubs from 1925 to 1929. Ziberova studied composition with N. Heifetz, I. Gottweiter, and E. Broomberg in 1931. From 1929 to 1941, she conducted and directed amateur theatrical productions, and participated in local government.

== Works ==
Her compositions include:

=== Ballet ===
- Buratino (1959)

=== Chamber ===
- Nocturne (1946)
- Plyasovaya (1946)

=== Operetta ===
- Kot v sapogakh

=== Orchestra ===
- Rodnoi gorod, march (for wind orchestra; 1941)
- Tam gole shli boi (symphonic poem; 1950)

=== Theatre ===
Ziberova composed approximately 150 pieces for theatre, including:

- Aull Gidzhe (Shestakov; 1930)
- Ignoramus (D. Fonvizin; 1933)
- The Misanthrope (Molière; 1934)
- William Tell (Schiller; 1935)

=== Vocal ===
Ziberova arranged many folksongs and composed over 120 original songs, including:

- Osvobozhdennomu gorodu (E. Shirman; 1941)
- Zhdi menya (K. Simonov; 1941)
- Don (A. Pushkin; 1940)
- Eleven songs (V. Shak; 1948-1953)
- Lesnaya tropa, cycle of 12 songs (A. Olenicha-Gneneko; 1952)
- Marsh studentov (E. Zinovev; 1949)
- Pesnaya o Lenine (D. Althausen; 1952)
