= Alexander Pushkin =

Russian writer (1799–1837)

- Александр Пушкин
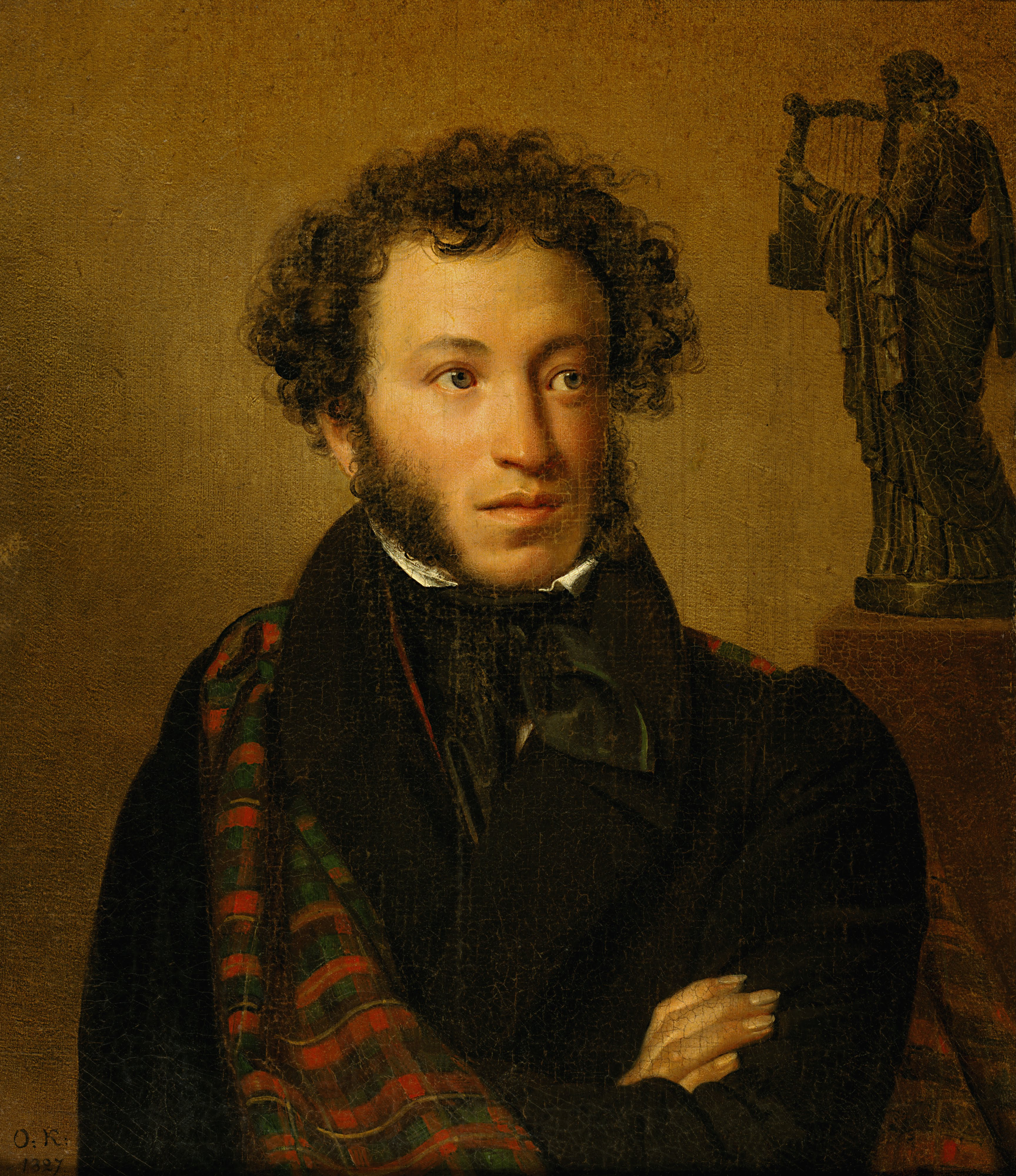
- Portrait by Orest Kiprensky, 1827
- Born: 6 June 1799; Moscow, Russia
- Died: 10 February 1837 (aged 37); Saint Petersburg, Russia
- Resting place: Svyatogorsky Monastery, Pushkinskiye Gory
- Education: Tsarskoye Selo Lyceum
- Occupations: Poet; novelist; playwright
- Spouse: Natalia Goncharova (m. 1831)
- Children: 4, including Natalia
- Relatives: Gannibal family (maternal)
- Writing career
- Language: Russian, French
- Period: Golden Age of Russian Poetry
- Genres: Novel; novel in verse; poem; drama; short story; fairytale
- Notable works: Eugene Onegin; The Captain's Daughter; Boris Godunov; Ruslan and Ludmila
- Movements: Romanticism; Realism; Classicism

Alexander Sergeyevich Pushkin (Note: The first name is also transliterated as Aleksandr. In this name that follows East Slavic naming customs, the patronymic is Sergeyevich and the family name is Pushkin.) (Note: English: /ˈpʊʃkɪn/; Russian: Александр Сергеевич Пушкин, IPA: [ɐlʲɪkˈsandr sʲɪrˈɡʲe(j)ɪvʲɪtɕ ˈpuʂkʲɪn]) (6 June [O.S. 26 May] 1799 – 10 February [O.S. 29 January] 1837) was a Russian poet, playwright, and novelist of the Romantic era. He is considered by many to be the greatest Russian poet, as well as the founder of modern Russian literature.

Pushkin was born into the Russian nobility in Moscow. His father, Sergey Lvovich Pushkin, belonged to an old noble family. One of his maternal great-grandfathers was Abram Petrovich Gannibal, a nobleman and military general of African origin who was kidnapped from his homeland by the Ottomans, then freed by Peter the Great and raised in the Emperor's court household as his godson.

Pushkin published his first poem at the age of 15, and was widely recognized by the literary establishment by the time of his graduation from the Tsarskoye Selo Lyceum. Upon graduation from the Lyceum, Pushkin recited his controversial poem "Ode to Liberty", one of several that led to his exile by Emperor Alexander I. While under strict surveillance by the Emperor's political police and unable to publish, Pushkin wrote his most famous play, Boris Godunov. His grand opus novel in verse Eugene Onegin was serialized between 1825 and 1832. Pushkin was fatally wounded in a duel with his wife's alleged lover (her sister's husband), Georges-Charles de Heeckeren d'Anthès, also known as Dantes-Gekkern, a French officer serving with the Russian Chevalier Guard Regiment.

== Ancestry ==
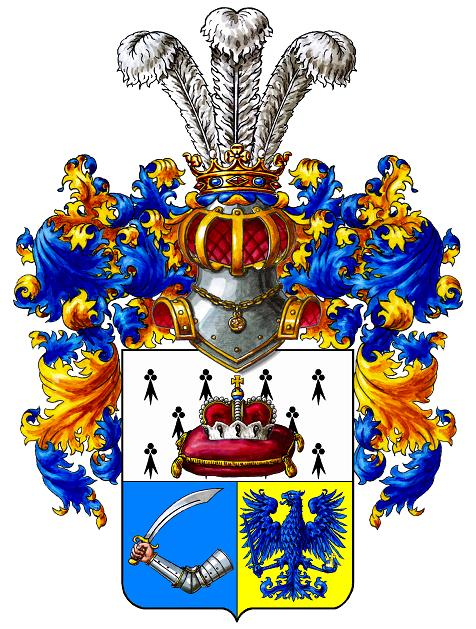
Coat of arms of the Pushkin family

Pushkin's father, Sergei Lvovich Pushkin (1767–1848), was descended from a distinguished family of the Russian nobility that traced its ancestry back to the 12th century. Pushkin's mother, Nadezhda (Nadya) Ossipovna Gannibal (1775–1836), was descended through her paternal grandmother from German and Scandinavian nobility. She was the daughter of Ossip Abramovich Gannibal (1744–1807) and his wife, Maria Alekseyevna Pushkina (1745–1818).

Ossip Abramovich Gannibal's father, Pushkin's great-grandfather, was Abram Petrovich Gannibal (1696–1781), an African page kidnapped and taken to Constantinople as a gift for the Ottoman Sultan and later transferred to Russia as a gift for Peter the Great. Abram wrote in a letter to Empress Elizabeth, Peter the Great's daughter, that he was from the town of "Lagon", largely on the basis of a mythical biography by Gannibal's son-in-law Rotkirch.

Vladimir Nabokov, when researching Eugene Onegin, cast serious doubt on this origin theory. Later research by the scholars Dieudonné Gnammankou and Hugh Barnes eventually conclusively established that Gannibal was instead born in Central Africa, in an area bordering Lake Chad in modern-day Cameroon. After education in France as a military engineer, Gannibal became governor of Reval and eventually Général en Chief (the third most senior army rank) in charge of the building of sea forts and canals in Russia.

== Early life ==
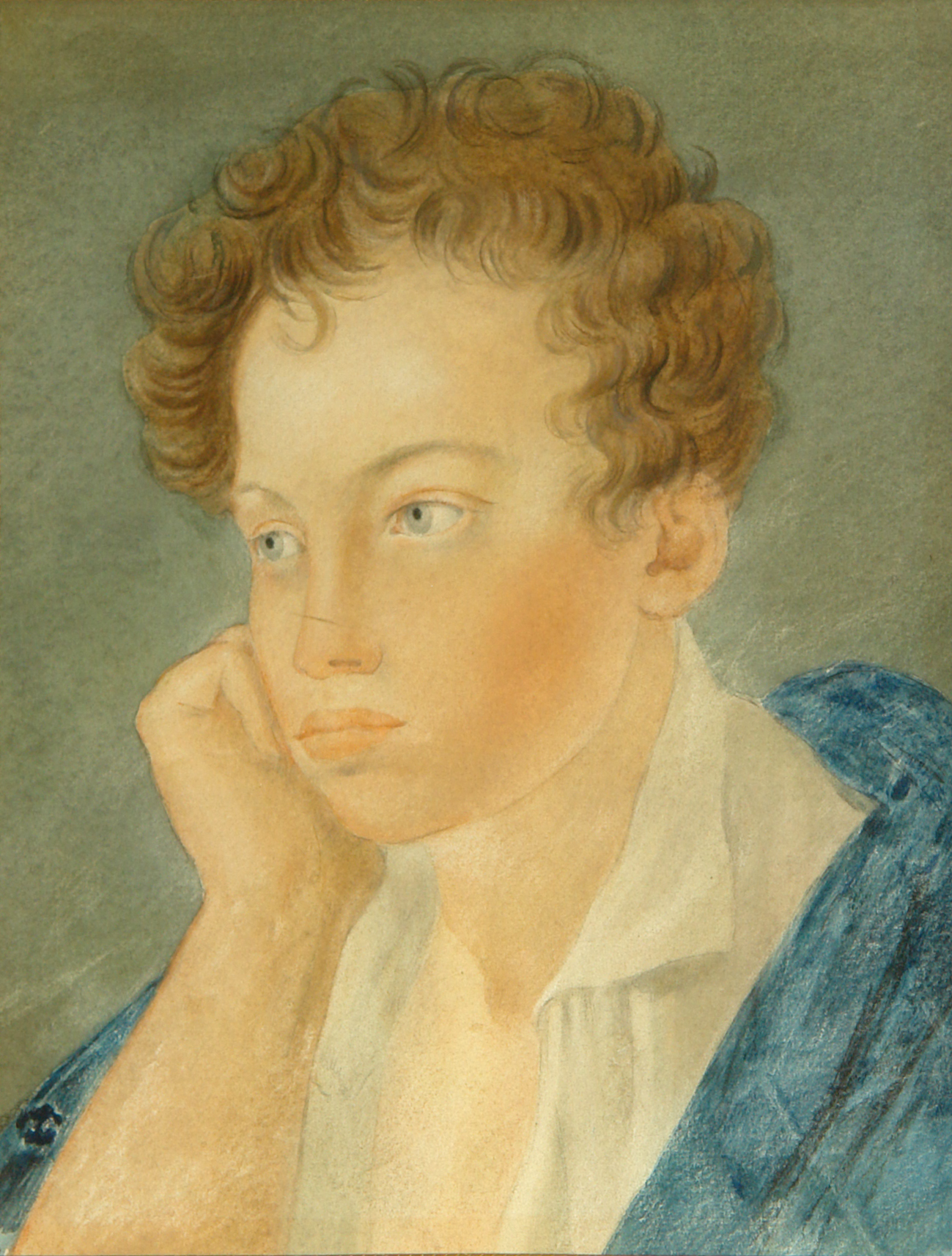
Pushkin in his youth, by Sergey Chirikov

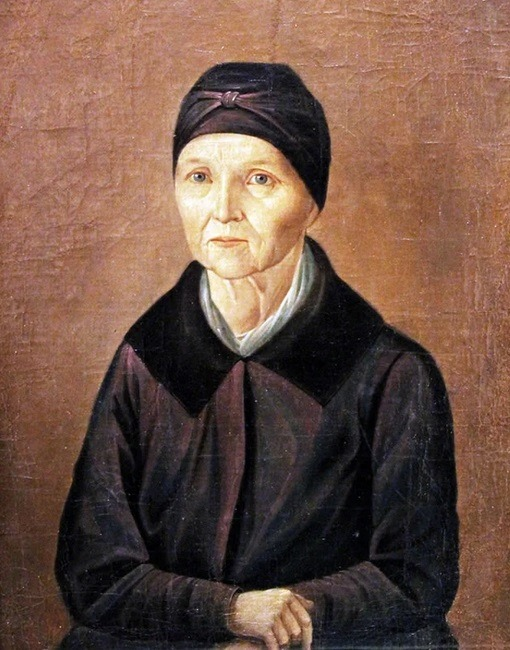
Arina Rodionovna Yakovleva (1758 - August 12, 1828) at age 70, a serf of the Gannibal (Hannibal) family and nanny of Alexander Pushkin

Born in Moscow, Pushkin was entrusted to nursemaids and French tutors, and spoke mostly French until the age of ten. He became acquainted with the Russian language through communication with household serfs and with his serf nanny, Arina Rodionovna, whom he loved dearly and to whom he was more attached than to his own mother.

Pushkin's first published poem, "К другу стихотворцу", appeared in 1814 when the poet was 15. When he finished school in 1817, as part of the first graduating class of the prestigious Imperial Lyceum in Tsarskoye Selo, near Saint Petersburg, his talent was already widely recognized on the Russian literary scene. At the Lyceum, he studied under David Mara, known in Russia as David de Boudry, a younger brother of French revolutionary Jean-Paul Marat. After school, Pushkin plunged into the vibrant and raucous intellectual youth-culture of Saint Petersburg, then the capital of the Russian Empire. In 1820, he published his first long poem, Ruslan and Ludmila, to much controversy about its subject and style.

== Social activism ==
While at the Lyceum, Pushkin was heavily influenced by the Kantian liberal individualist teachings of Alexander Kunitsyn, whom Pushkin would later commemorate in his poem 19 October. Pushkin also immersed himself in the thought of the French Enlightenment, to which he would remain permanently indebted throughout his life, especially Voltaire, whom he described as "the first to follow the new road, and to bring the lamp of philosophy into the dark archives of history".

Pushkin gradually became committed to social reform, and emerged as a spokesman for literary radicals. That angered the government and led to his transfer from the capital in May 1820. He went to the Caucasus and to Crimea and then to Kamianka and Chișinău in Bessarabia.

He joined the Filiki Eteria, a secret organization whose purpose was to overthrow Ottoman rule in Greece and establish an independent Greek state. He was inspired by the Greek Revolution and when the war against the Ottoman Empire broke out, he kept a diary recording the events of the national uprising.

== Rise ==
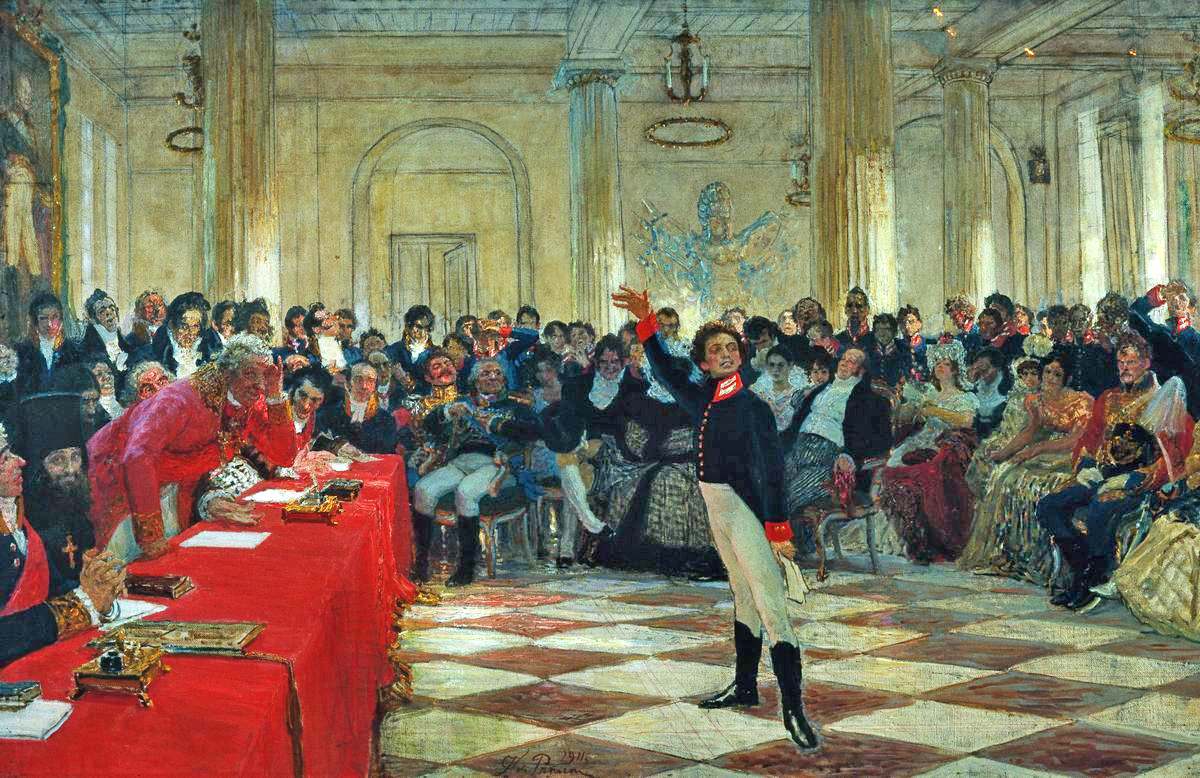
Pushkin recites his poem before Gavrila Derzhavin during an exam in the Tsarskoye Selo Lyceum on 8 January 1815. Painting by Ilya Repin (1911)

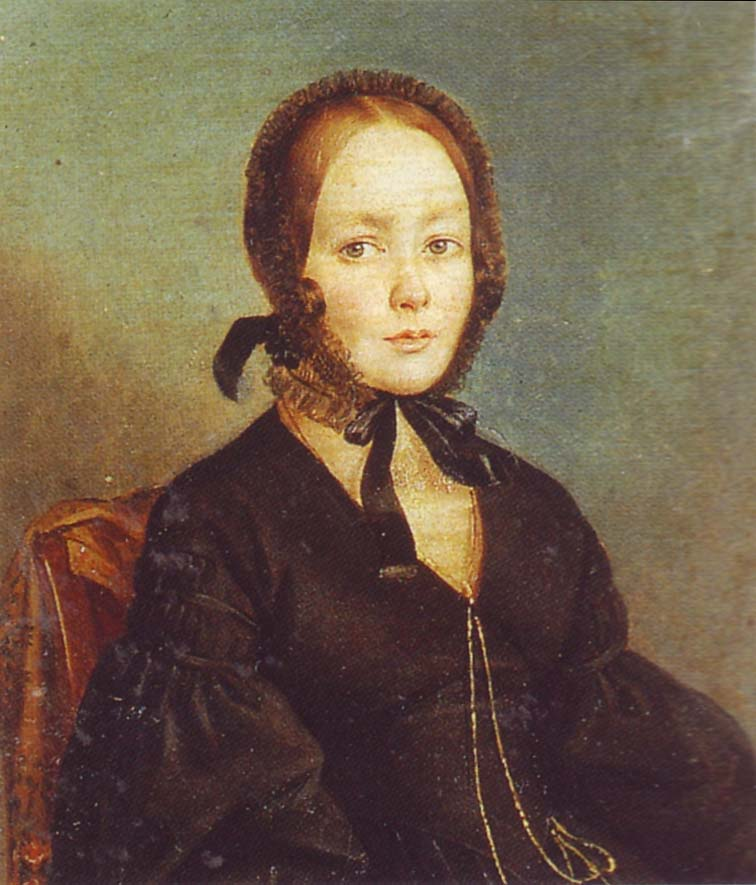
Pushkin's married lover Anna Petrovna Kern, for whom he probably wrote the most famous love poem in Russian

He stayed in Chișinău until 1823 and wrote two Romantic poems which brought him acclaim: The Prisoner of the Caucasus and The Fountain of Bakhchisaray. In 1823, Pushkin moved to Odessa, where he again clashed with the government, which sent him into exile on his mother's rural estate of Mikhailovskoye, near Pskov, from 1824 to 1826.

In Mikhailovskoye, Pushkin wrote nostalgic love poems which he dedicated to Elizaveta Vorontsova, wife of Novorossiya's General-Governor. Then Pushkin worked on his verse-novel Eugene Onegin.

In Mikhailovskoye, in 1825, Pushkin wrote the poem To***. It is generally believed that he dedicated this poem to Anna Kern, but there are other opinions. Poet Mikhail Dudin believed that the poem was dedicated to the serf Olga Kalashnikova. Pushkinist Kira Victorova believed that the poem was dedicated to the Empress Elizaveta Alekseyevna. Vadim Nikolayev argued that the idea about the Empress was marginal and refused to discuss it, while trying to prove that poem had been dedicated to Tatyana Larina, the heroine of Eugene Onegin. During that same year (1825) Pushkin also wrote what would become his most famous play, the drama Boris Godunov, while at his mother's estate. He could not, however, gain permission to publish it until five years later. The original and uncensored version of the drama was not staged until 2007.

Authorities summoned Pushkin to Moscow after his poem Ode to Liberty was found among the belongings of the rebels from the Decembrist Uprising (1825). After his exile in 1820 Pushkin's friends and family continually petitioned for his release, sending letters and meeting Emperor Alexander I and then Emperor Nicholas I on the heels of the Decembrist Uprising. Many of the Decembrists were his friends and fellow writers; Pushkin was known widely for his belief in freedom from political and moral oppression, but the Decembrists did not trust him because “he had a big mouth” and was known to be impulsive and egotistical.

Upon meeting Emperor Nicholas I Pushkin obtained his release from exile and began to work as the emperor's Titular Counsel of the National Archives. However, because insurgents in the Decembrist Uprising (1825) in Saint Petersburg had kept some of Pushkin's earlier political poems, the emperor retained strict control of everything Pushkin published and he was banned from travelling at will.

Pushkin’s conversation with Nicholas I is not known to us, and it can only be restored from Pushkin’s later statements. After this conversation Pushkin became a supporter of Nicholas I. It was not the betrayal of Pushkin’s social ideals, it was his confidence that in the personality of Nicholas I Russia had a conductor of those events that put it forward in the direction dictated precisely by these social ideals, joined by a feeling of personal gratitude to Nicholas, who had freed the poet from exile. This attitude was vividly expressed in the stanzas: "No, I am not a flatterer when I compose free praise to the Tsar". Pushkin's patriotic poem To the Slanderers of Russia written during the 1830–1831 Polish uprising aroused hostility among some of the Russian liberals.

Around 1825–1829, he met and befriended the Polish poet Adam Mickiewicz, during exile in central Russia. In 1829 he travelled through the Caucasus to Erzurum to visit friends fighting in the Russian army during the Russo-Turkish War. At the end of 1829 Pushkin wanted to set off on a journey abroad, the desire reflected in his poem Let's go, I'm ready. He applied for permission for the journey but received negative response from Nicholas I on 17 January 1830.

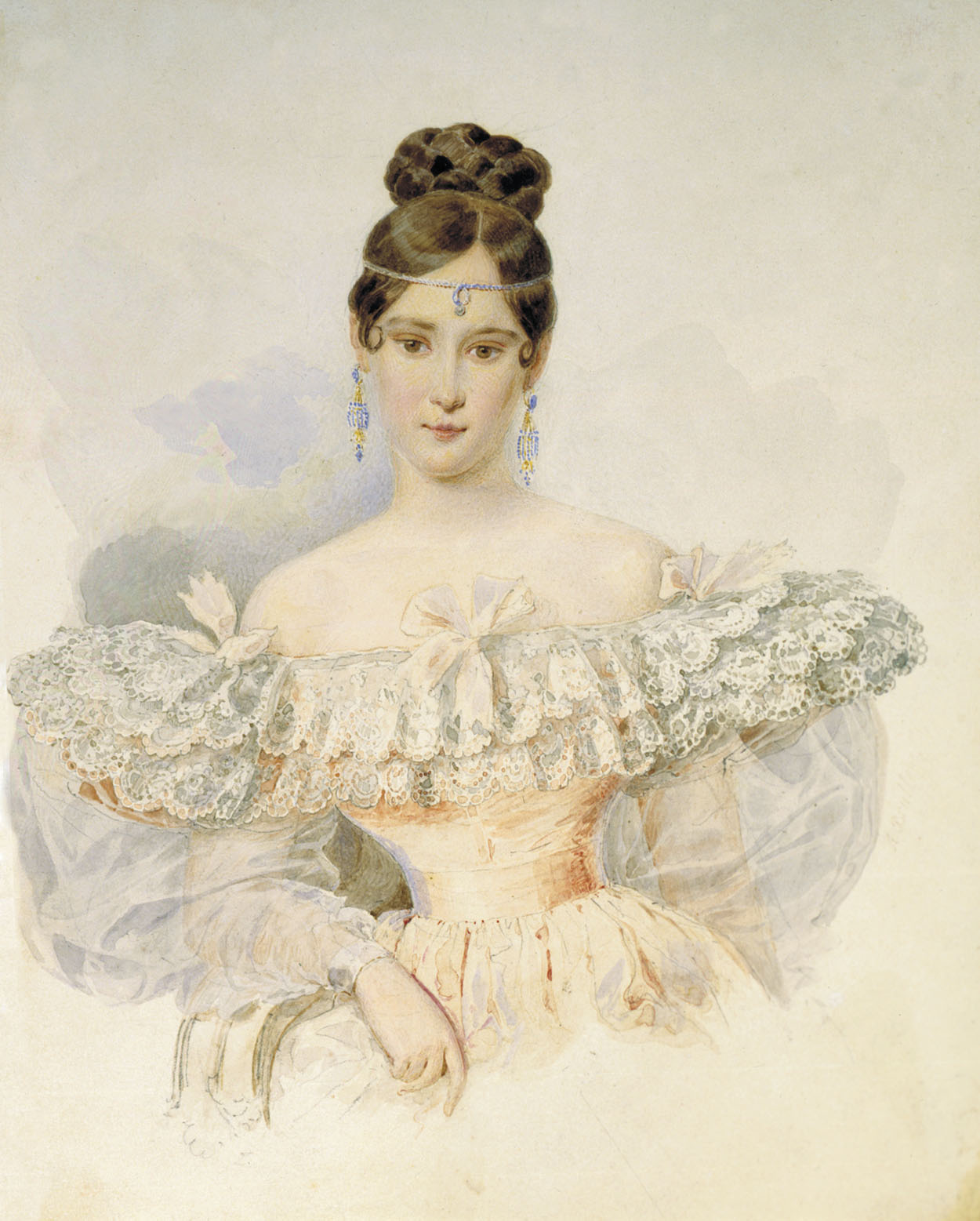
Natalia Pushkina, portrait by Alexander Brullov, 1831.

Around 1828 Pushkin met Natalia Goncharova, then 16 years old and one of the most talked-about beauties of Moscow. After much hesitation Natalia accepted a proposal of marriage from Pushkin in April 1830, but not before she received assurances that the Tsarist government had no intention of persecuting the libertarian poet. Later Pushkin and his wife became regulars of court society. They officially became engaged on 6 May 1830 and sent out wedding invitations. Owing to an outbreak of cholera and other circumstances, the wedding was delayed for a year. The ceremony took place on 18 February 1831 (Old Style) in the Great Ascension Church on Bolshaya Nikitskaya Street in Moscow.

Pushkin's marriage to Goncharova was largely a happy one, but his wife’s characteristic flirtatiousness and frivolity would lead to his fatal duel seven years later, for Pushkin had a highly jealous temperament.

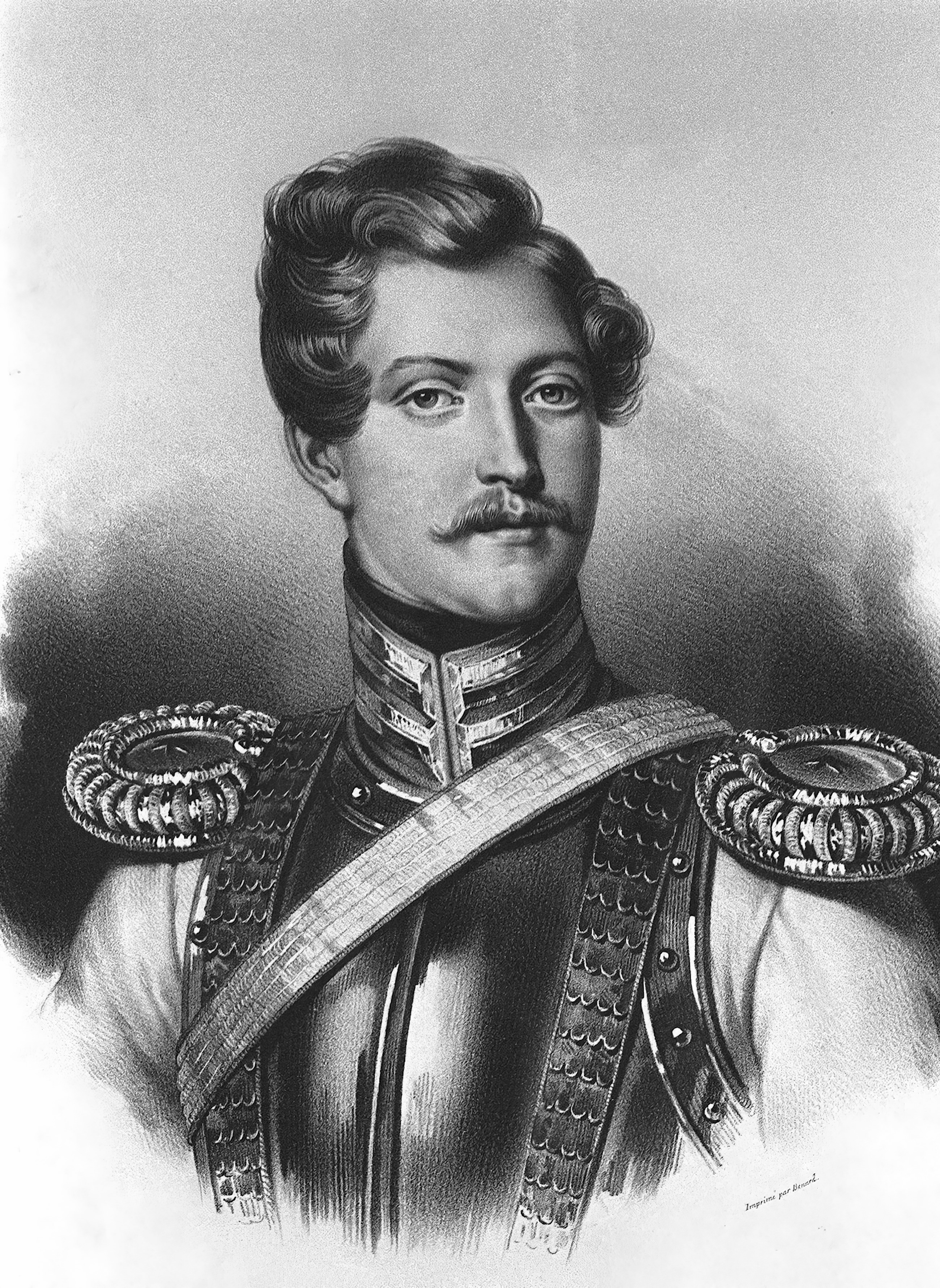
Georges d'Anthès

In 1831, during the period of Pushkin's growing literary influence, he met other influential early writers, such as Russo-Ukrainian Nikolai Gogol. After reading Gogol's 1831–1832 volume of short stories Evenings on a Farm Near Dikanka, Pushkin supported him and would feature some of Gogol's most famous short stories in the magazine The Contemporary, which he founded in 1836.

== Death ==
By the autumn of 1836, Pushkin was falling into greater and greater debt and faced scandalous rumours that his wife was having a love affair. On 4 November, he sent a challenge to a duel to Georges d'Anthès, also known as Dantes-Gekkern. Jacob van Heeckeren, d'Anthès' adoptive father, asked that the duel be delayed by two weeks. With efforts by the poet's friends, the duel was cancelled.

On 17 November, d'Anthès proposed to Natalia Goncharova's sister, Ekaterina. The marriage did not resolve the conflict. D'Anthès continued to pursue Natalia Goncharova in public and rumours circulated that d'Anthès had married Natalia's sister just to save her reputation.

On 26 January (7 February in the Gregorian calendar) 1837 Pushkin sent a "highly insulting letter" to Gekkern. The only answer to that letter could be a challenge to a duel, as Pushkin knew. Pushkin received the formal challenge to a duel through his sister-in-law, Ekaterina Gekkerna, approved by d'Anthès, on the same day through the attaché of the French Embassy, Viscount d'Archiac.

Pushkin asked Arthur Magenis, then attaché to the British Consulate-General in Saint Petersburg, to be his second. Magenis did not formally accept but on 26 January (7 February) approached Viscount d'Archiac to attempt a reconciliation; however d'Archiac refused to speak with him as he was not yet officially Pushkin's second. Magenis, unable to find Pushkin in the evening, sent him a letter through a messenger at 2 o'clock in the morning declining to be his second, as the possibility of a peaceful settlement had already been quashed, and the traditional first task of the second was to try to bring about a reconciliation.

The pistol duel with d'Anthès took place on 27 January (8 February) at the Black River, without the presence of a second for Pushkin. The duel they fought was of a kind known as a "barrier duel". (Note: This was coincidentally the same form of duel as the one depicted in Eugene Onegin; see Hopton (2011)) The rules of this type dictated that the duellists began at an agreed distance. After the signal to begin, they walked towards each other, closing the distance. They could fire at any time they wished, but the duellist that shot first was required to stand still and wait for the other to shoot back at his leisure.

D'Anthès fired first, critically wounding Pushkin; the bullet entered at his hip and penetrated his abdomen. D'Anthès was only lightly wounded in the right arm by Pushkin's shot. Two days later, at 2.45 pm on 29 January (10 February), Pushkin died of peritonitis.

In Fyodor Dostoevsky's novel The Idiot, a character suggests that the shot was accidental: ‘The bullet hit so low that d’Anthès was probably aiming somewhere higher, the chest or the head; nobody aims where that bullet hit, that means it probably hit Pushkin by chance, a fluke. I’ve been told that by people who know.’

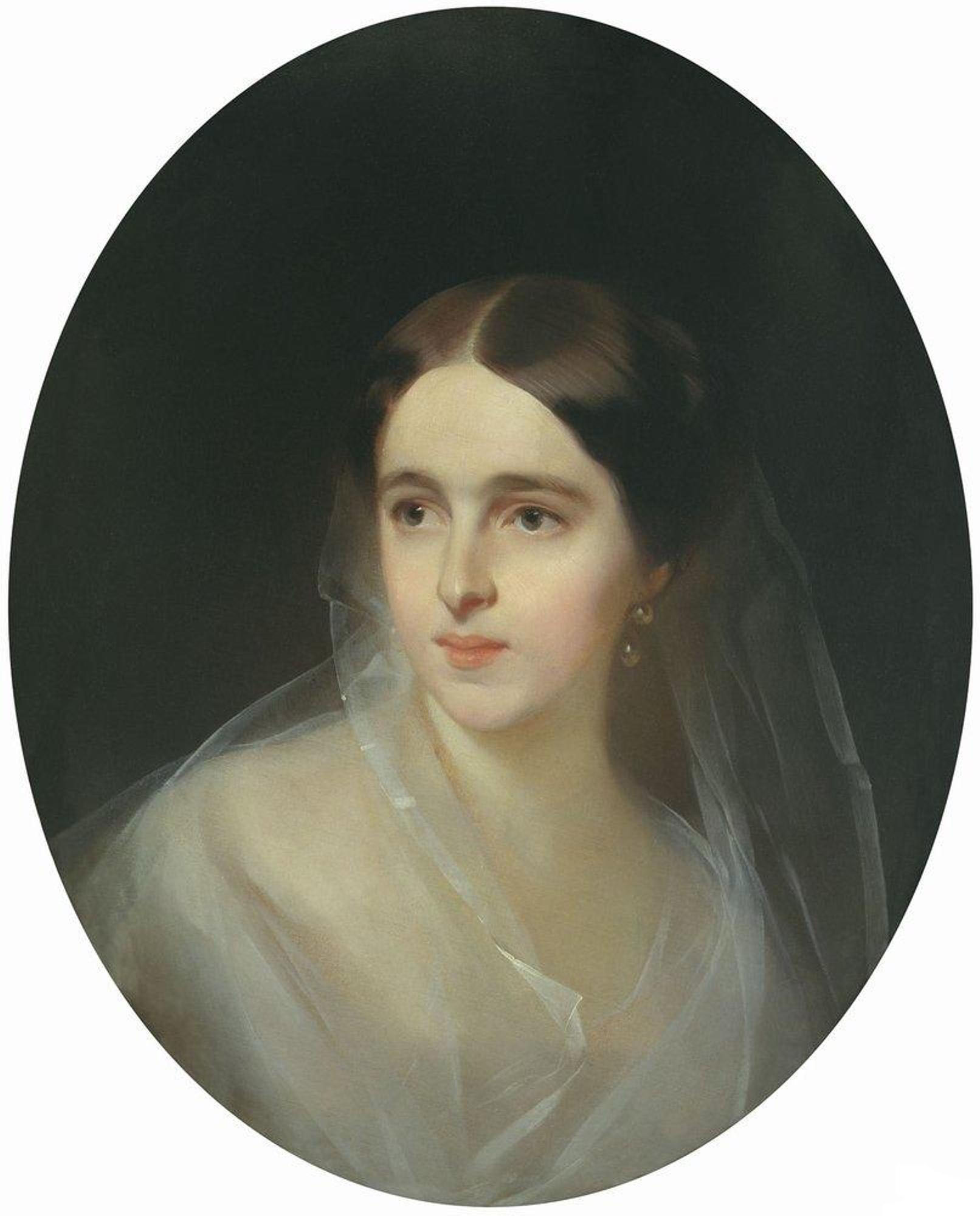
His widow Natalia Goncharova, 1849

At Pushkin's wife's request he was put in the coffin in evening dress, not in chamber-cadet uniform, the uniform provided by the emperor. The funeral service was initially assigned to St Isaac's Cathedral but was moved to Konyushennaya church. Many people attended. After the funeral the coffin was lowered into the basement, where it stayed until 3 February, when it was removed to Pskov province. Pushkin was buried in the grounds of Svyatogorsky monastery in present-day Pushkinskiye Gory, near Pskov, beside his mother. His last home is now a museum.

== Descendants ==
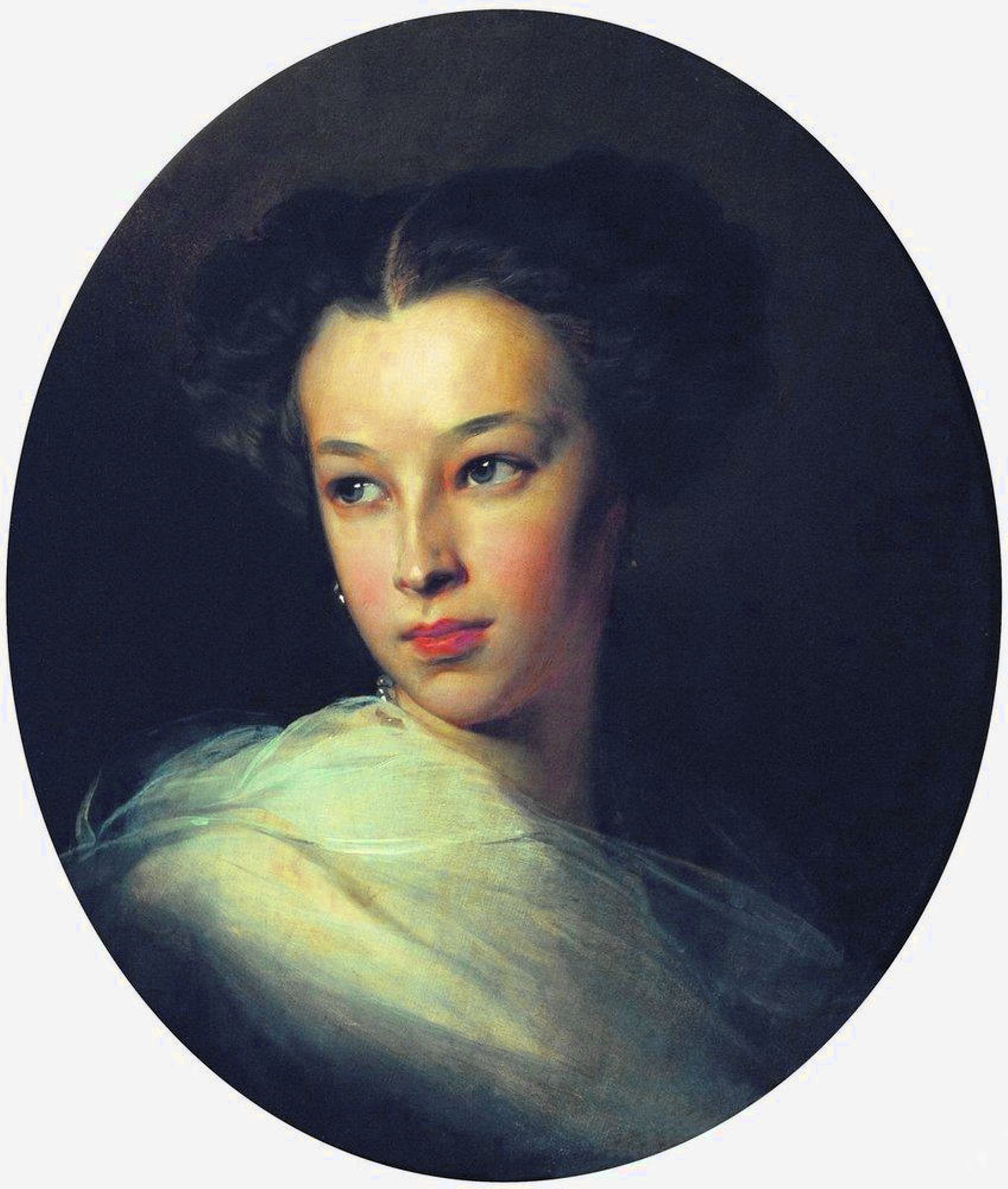
Natalia Alexandrovna Pushkina, Countess of Merenberg

Pushkin had four children from his marriage to Natalia: Maria (b. 1832), Alexander (b. 1833), Grigory (b. 1835) and Natalia (b. 1836), the last of whom married morganatically Prince Nikolaus Wilhelm of Nassau of the House of Nassau-Weilburg and was granted the title of Countess of Merenberg. Her daughter Sophie married Grand Duke Michael Mikhailovich of Russia, a grandson of Emperor Nicholas I.

Only the lines of Alexander and Natalia remain. Natalia's granddaughter, Nadejda, married into the extended British royal family, her husband being the uncle of Prince Philip, Duke of Edinburgh, and is the grandmother of the present Marquess of Milford Haven. Descendants of the poet now live around the globe in the United Kingdom, the Czech Republic, Germany, Belgium, Luxembourg and the United States.

== Legacy ==
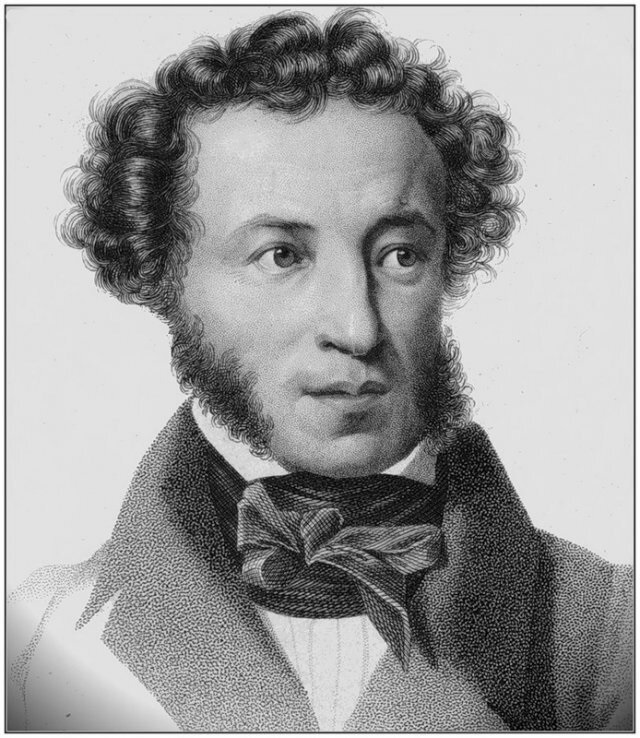
A steel engraving by the English artist Thomas Wright (engraver), who lived in Russia for a long time. Dated 1837. Whether the drawing was made from life is unknown, but Pushkin and Wright were acquainted.

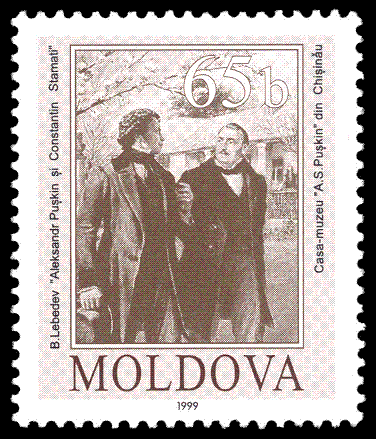
1999 stamp of Moldova showing Pushkin and Constantin Stamati

=== Literary ===
Critics consider many of his works masterpieces, such as the poem The Bronze Horseman and the drama The Stone Guest, a tale of the fall of Don Juan. His poetic short drama Mozart and Salieri (like The Stone Guest, one of the so-called four Little Tragedies, a collective characterization by Pushkin himself in 1830 letter to Pyotr Pletnyov) was the inspiration for Peter Shaffer's Amadeus as well as providing the libretto (almost verbatim) to Rimsky-Korsakov's opera Mozart and Salieri.

Pushkin is also known for his short stories. In particular his cycle The Tales of the Late Ivan Petrovich Belkin, including "The Shot", were well received. According to the literary theorist Kornelije Kvas,

"the narrative logic and the plausibility of that which is narrated, together with the precision, conciseness – economy of the presentation of reality – all of the above is achieved in Tales of Belkin, especially, and most of all in the story The Stationmaster. Pushkin is the progenitor of the long and fruitful development of Russian realist literature, for he manages to attain the realist ideal of a concise presentation of reality".

Pushkin himself preferred his verse novel Eugene Onegin, which he wrote over the course of his life and which, starting a tradition of great Russian novels, follows a few central characters but varies widely in tone and focus.

Onegin is a work of such complexity that, though it is only about a hundred pages long, translator Vladimir Nabokov needed two full volumes of material to fully render its meaning into English. Because of this difficulty in translation, Pushkin's verse remains largely unknown to English readers. Even so Pushkin has profoundly influenced western writers such as Henry James. Pushkin wrote "The Queen of Spades", a short story frequently anthologized in English translation.

=== Musical ===
Pushkin's works also provided fertile ground for Russian composers. Glinka's Ruslan and Lyudmila is the earliest important Pushkin-inspired opera, and a landmark in the tradition of Russian music. Tchaikovsky's operas Eugene Onegin (1879) and The Queen of Spades (Pikovaya Dama, 1890) became perhaps better known outside of Russia than Pushkin's own works of the same name.

Mussorgsky's monumental Boris Godunov (two versions, 1868–9 and 1871–2) ranks as one of the very finest and most original of Russian operas. Other Russian operas based on Pushkin include Dargomyzhsky's Rusalka and The Stone Guest; Rimsky-Korsakov's Mozart and Salieri, Tale of Tsar Saltan, and The Golden Cockerel; Cui's Prisoner of the Caucasus, Feast in Time of Plague, and The Captain's Daughter; Tchaikovsky's Mazeppa; Rachmaninoff's one-act operas Aleko (based on The Gypsies) and The Miserly Knight; Stravinsky's Mavra, and Nápravník's Dubrovsky.

Additionally, ballets and cantatas, as well as innumerable songs, have been set to Pushkin's verse (including even his French-language poems, in Isabelle Aboulker's song cycle "Caprice étrange"). Suppé, Leoncavallo and Malipiero have also based operas on his works. Composers Tamara Popatenko, Miriam Rakhmankulova, Valentina Ramm, Yudif Grigorevna Rozhavskaya, Galina Konstantinovna Smirnova, Yevgania Yosifovna Yakhina, Maria Semyonovna Zavalishina, and Zinaida Petrovna Ziberova composed songs using Pushkin's text.

The Desire of Glory, which has been dedicated to Elizaveta Vorontsova, was set to music by David Tukhmanov, as well as Keep Me, Mine Talisman – by Alexander Barykin and later by Tukhmanov.

=== Romanticism ===
Pushkin is considered by many to be the central representative of Romanticism in Russian literature; however, he was not unequivocally known as a Romantic. Russian critics have traditionally argued that his works represent a path from Neoclassicism through Romanticism to Realism. An alternative assessment suggests that "he had an ability to entertain contrarities which may seem Romantic in origin, but are ultimately subversive of all fixed points of view, all single outlooks, including the Romantic" and that "he is simultaneously Romantic and not Romantic".

=== Russian literature ===
Pushkin is usually credited with developing Russian literature. He is seen as having originated the highly nuanced level of language which characterizes Russian literature after him, and he is also credited with substantially augmenting the Russian lexicon. Whenever he found gaps in the Russian vocabulary, he devised calques. His rich vocabulary and highly-sensitive style are the foundation for modern Russian literature. His accomplishments set new records for development of the Russian language and culture. He became the father of Russian literature in the 19th century, marking the highest achievements of the 18th century and the beginning of literary process of the 19th century. He introduced Russia to all the European literary genres as well as a great number of West European writers. He brought natural speech and foreign influences to create modern poetic Russian. Though his life was brief, he left examples of nearly every literary genre of his day: lyric poetry, narrative poetry, the novel, the short story, the drama, the critical essay and even the personal letter.

According to Vladimir Nabokov,

Pushkin's idiom combined all the contemporaneous elements of Russian with all he had learned from Derzhavin, Zhukovsky, Batyushkov, Karamzin and Krylov:

1. The poetical and metaphysical strain that still lived in Church Slavonic forms and locutions
2. Abundant and natural gallicisms
3. Everyday colloquialisms of his set
4. Stylized popular speech by combining the famous three styles (low, medium elevation, high) dear to the pseudoclassical archaists and adding the ingredients of Russian romanticists with a pinch of parody.

His work as a critic and as a journalist marked the birth of Russian magazine culture which included him devising and contributing heavily to one of the most influential literary magazines of the 19th century, the Sovremennik (The Contemporary, or Современник). Pushkin inspired the folk tales and genre pieces of other authors: Leskov, Yesenin and Gorky. His use of Russian formed the basis of the style of novelists Ivan Turgenev, Ivan Goncharov and Leo Tolstoy, as well as that of subsequent lyric poets such as Mikhail Lermontov. Pushkin was analysed by Nikolai Gogol, his successor and pupil, and the great Russian critic Vissarion Belinsky, who produced the fullest and deepest critical study of Pushkin's work, which still retains much of its relevance.

=== Soviet centennial celebrations ===
In the centennial year of Pushkin's death in 1937, a mass renaming of streets across the entire Soviet Union occurred in his honour. Prior to 2022, Pushkin was the third most common historical figure represented in Ukraine’s streets; however, his monuments were removed and streets bearing his name were renamed following the Russian invasion of Ukraine. These monuments, along with any toponymy named after him, are now illegal in Ukraine following the implementation of a law that bans symbols "dedicated to persons who publicly, including … in literary and other artistic works, supported, glorified, or justified Russian imperial policy".

The centennial of Pushkin's death in 1937 was one of the most significant literary commemorations of the Soviet era, second only to the 1928 centennial of Leo Tolstoy's birth. Although Pushkin's image was prominently displayed in Soviet propaganda, from billboards to candy wrappers, it conflicted with the ideal Soviet persona. Pushkin was reputed as a libertine with aristocratic tendencies, which clashed with Soviet values and led to a form of repressive revisionism, akin to the Stalinist reworking of Tolstoy's Christian anarchism.

== Honours ==
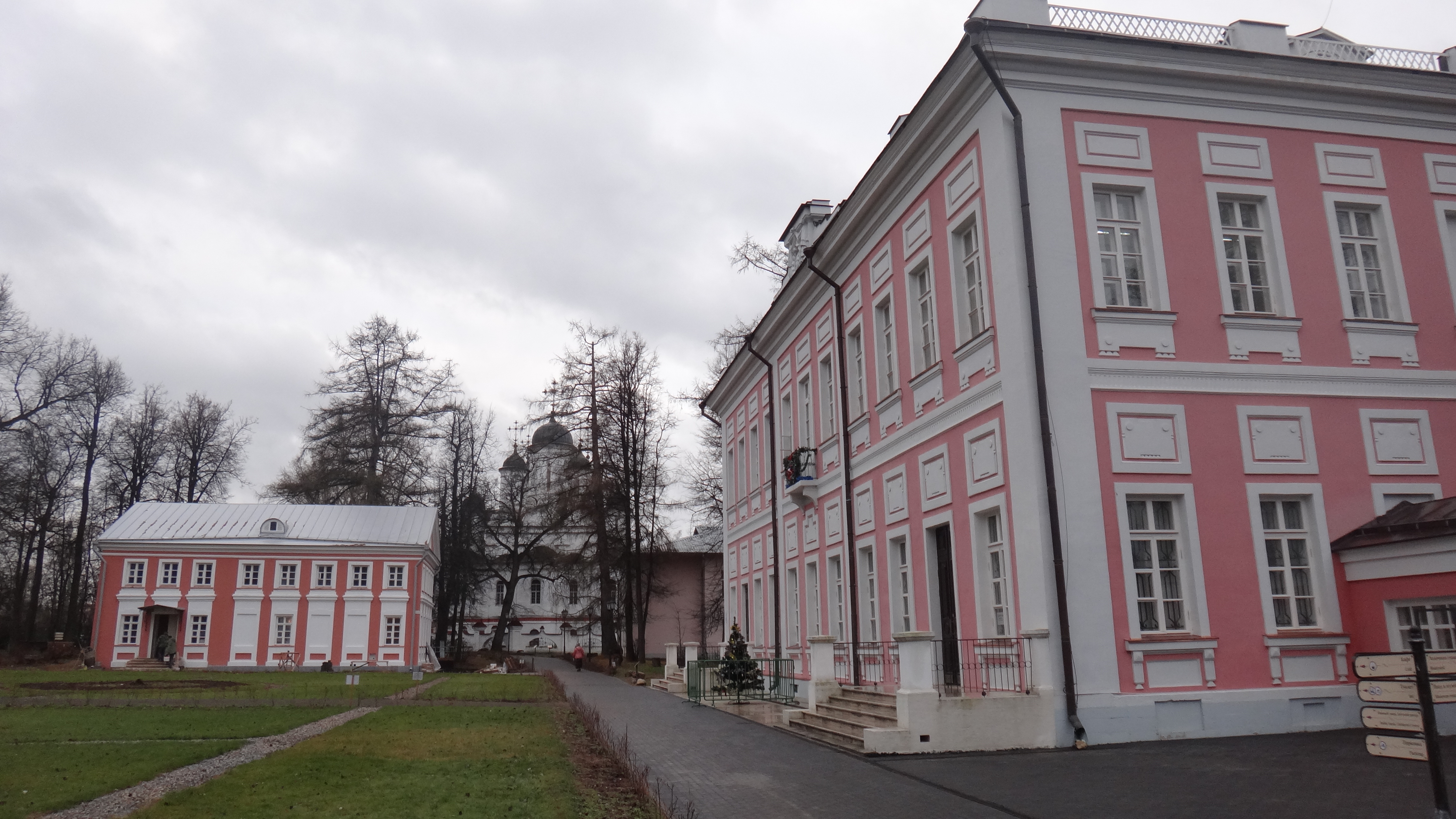
Pushkin Museum, Bolshiye Vyazyomy in Golitsyno, Moskovskaya oblast, which Pushkin visited several times in his youth

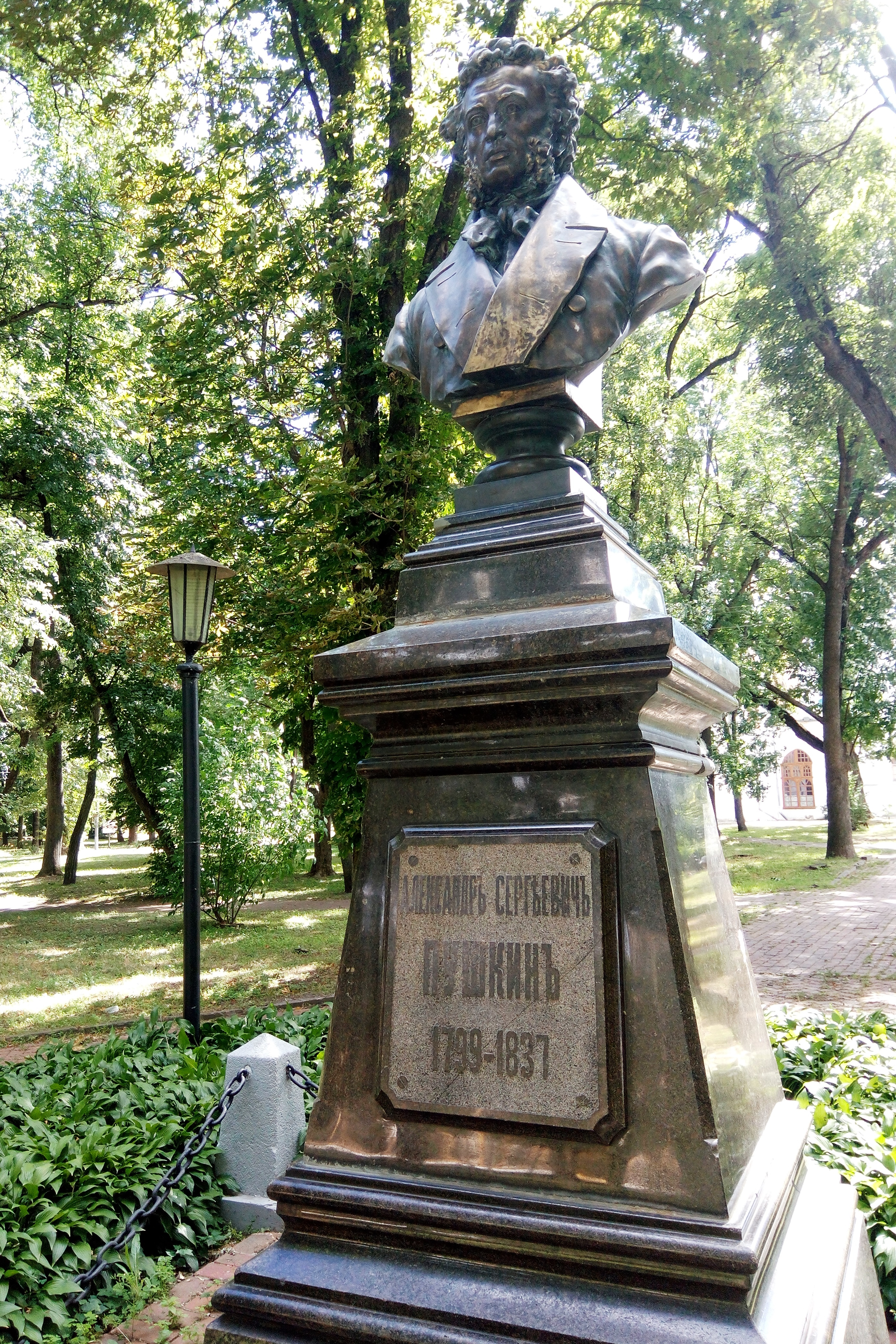
Now dismantled monument in Chernihiv, Ukraine as it was in 2019

- Shortly after Pushkin's death, contemporary Russian romantic poet Mikhail Lermontov wrote "Death of the Poet". The poem, which ended with a passage blaming the aristocracy being (as oppressors of freedom) the true culprits in Pushkin's death, was not published (nor could have been) but was informally circulated in St. Petersburg. Lermontov was arrested and exiled to a regiment in the Caucasus.
- The Serbian poet and ruler Petar II Petrović-Njegoš included a poetic ode to Pushkin, titled Sjeni Aleksandra Puškina (To the Shadow of Alexander Pushkin), in his 1846 poetry collection Ogledalo srpsko (The Serbian Mirror).
- In 1929, the Soviet writer Leonid Grossman published a novel The d'Archiac Papers, telling the story of Pushkin's death from the perspective of a French diplomat, being a participant and a witness of the fatal duel. The book describes him as a liberal and a victim of the Tsarist regime.
- In 1937, the town of Tsarskoye Selo was renamed Pushkin in his honour.
- There are several museums in Russia dedicated to Pushkin, including two in Moscow, one in Saint Petersburg, and a large complex in Mikhailovskoye known as the Mikhailovskoye Museum Reserve.
- Pushkin's death was portrayed in the 2006 biographical film Pushkin: The Last Duel. The film was directed by Natalya Bondarchuk. Pushkin was portrayed on screen by Sergei Bezrukov.
- His life was dramatised in the 1951 Australian radio play The Golden Cockerel
- In 2000, the Statue of Alexander Pushkin (Washington, D.C.) was erected as part of a cultural exchange between the cities of Moscow and Washington. In return, a statue of the American poet Walt Whitman was erected in Moscow.
- The Pushkin Trust was established in 1987 by the Duchess of Abercorn to commemorate the creative legacy and spirit of her ancestor and to release the creativity and imagination of the children of Ireland by providing them with opportunities to communicate their thoughts, feelings and experiences.
- A minor planet, 2208 Pushkin, discovered in 1977 by Soviet astronomer Nikolai Chernykh, is named after him. A crater on Mercury is also named in his honour.

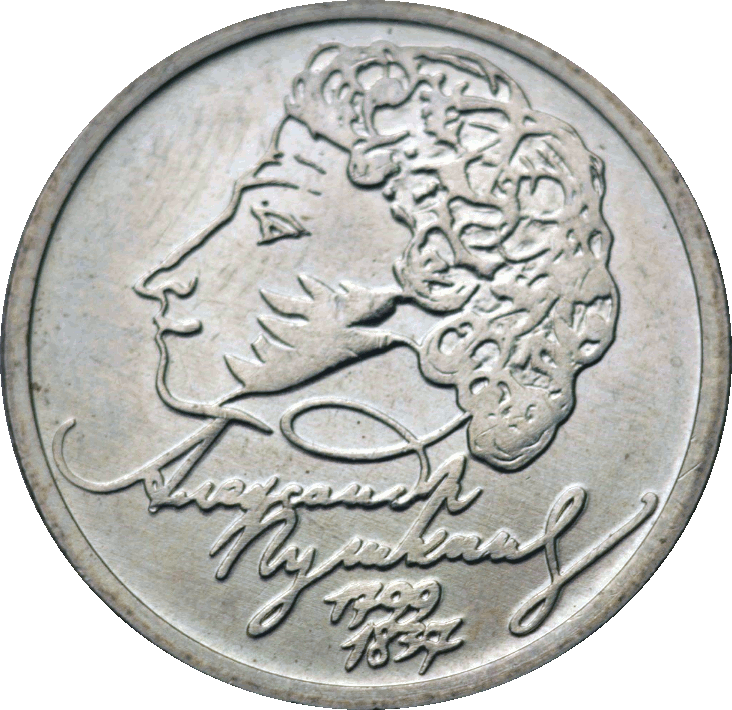
1999 Russian 1 rouble coin commemorating the 200th anniversary of Pushkin's birth

- MS Aleksandr Pushkin, second ship of the Russian Ivan Franko class (also referred to as "poet" or "writer" class).
- A station of Tashkent metro was named in his honour.
- The Pushkin Hills and Pushkin Lake were named in his honour in Ben Nevis Township, Cochrane District, in Ontario, Canada.
- UN Russian Language Day, established by the United Nations in 2010 and celebrated each year on 6 June, was scheduled to coincide with Pushkin's birthday.
- A statue of Pushkin was unveiled inside the Mehan Garden in Manila, Philippines to commemorate the Philippines–Russia relations in 2010.
- The Alexander Pushkin diamond, the second largest found in Russia (Russia was at the time part of the USSR), was named after him.
- On 28 November 2009, a Pushkin Monument was erected in Asmara, capital of Eritrea.
- In 2005, a monument to Pushkin and his grandmother Maria Hannibal was commissioned by an enthusiast of Russian culture Just Rugel in Zakharovo, Russia. Sculptor V. Kozinin.
- In 2019, Moscow's Sheremetyevo International Airport was named after Pushkin in accordance to the Great Names of Russia contest.

== Works ==
The following list of works is based on the Complete Works in Ten Volumes (Полное собрание сочинений в десяти томах, 1950–1951, Russian Academy of Sciences) and Complete Works (Полное собрание сочинений) in 19 volumes (Moscow: Воскресенье, 1994–1997). If the final year of composition and the year of publication differ, the latter is placed in brackets. Scientific transliteration of Cyrillic is used for romanisation of Russian titles.

=== Narrative poems ===
- 1817–20 – Ruslan i Ljudmila (Руслан и Людмила); English translation: Ruslan and Ludmila
- 1820–21 – Kavkazskij plennik (Кавказский пленник); English translation: The Prisoner of the Caucasus
- 1821 (1861) – Gavriiliada (Гавриилиада); English translation: The Gabrieliad
- 1821–22 (1827) – Vadim (Вадим) (unfinished)
- 1821–22 (1825) – Brat'ja razbojniki (Братья разбойники); English translation: The Robber Brothers (mostly lost)
- 1821–23 (1824) – Baxčisarajskij fontan (Бахчисарайский фонтан); English translation: The Fountain of Bakhchisaray
- 1824 (1827) – Cygany (Цыганы); English translation: The Gypsies
- 1825 (1828) – Graf Nulin (Граф Нулин); English translation: Count Nulin
- 1828–29 – Poltava (Полтава)
- 1829–30 (1837) – Tazit (Тазит) (unfinished)
- 1830 (1833) – Domik v Kolomne (Домик в Коломне); English translation: The Little House in Kolomna
- 1823–30 (1825–32, in single volume 1833) – Evgenij Onegin (Евгений Онегин); English translation: Eugene Onegin
- 1832–33 – Ezerskij (Езерский) (unfinished)
- 1833 (1834) – Andželo (Анджело); English translation: Angelo
- 1833 (1837) – Mednyj vsadnik (Медный всадник); English translation: The Bronze Horseman

=== Drama ===
- 1824–25 (1830) – Boris Godunov (Борис Годунов); English translation: Boris Godunov
- 1830 – Malen'kie tragedii (Маленькие трагедии); English translation: Little Tragedies
  - (1836) Skupoj rycar' (Скупой рыцарь); English translations: The Miserly Knight, or The Covetous Knight
  - (1831) Mocart i Sal'eri (Моцарт и Сальери); English translation: Mozart and Salieri
  - (1839) Kamennyj gost' (Каменный гость); English translation: The Stone Guest
  - (1832) Pir vo vremja čumy (Пир во время чумы); English translation: A Feast in Time of Plague
- 1835 (1837) Sceny iz rycarskih vremen (Сцены из рыцарских времен); English translation: Scenes from the Times of Chivalry (unfinished)
- 1829–32 (1837) – Rusalka (Русалка) (unfinished)

=== Fairy tales in verse ===
- 1822 (1858) – Car' Nikita i sorok ego dočerej (Царь Никита и сорок его дочерей); English translation: Tsar Nikita and His Forty Daughters
- 1825 (1827) – Ženix (Жених); English translation: The Bridegroom
- 1830 (1840) – Skazka o pope i o rabotnike ego Balde (Сказка о попе и о работнике его Балде); English translation: The Tale of the Priest and of His Workman Balda
- 1830 (1855) – Skazka o medvedixe (Сказка о медведихе); English translation: The Tale of the Female Bear, or The Tale of the Bear (unfinished)
- 1831 (1832) – Skazka o care Saltane (Сказка о царе Салтане); English translation: The Tale of Tsar Saltan
- 1833 (1835) – Skazka o rybake i rybke (Сказка о рыбаке и рыбке); English translation: The Tale of the Fisherman and the Fish
- 1833 (1834) – Skazka o mertvoj carevne (Сказка о мертвой царевне); English translation: The Tale of the Dead Princess
- 1834 (1835) – Skazka o zolotom petuške (Сказка о золотом петушке); English translation: The Tale of the Golden Cockerel

=== Lyric poems (selection) ===
- 1817 (1856) – Vol'nost'. Oda (Вольность. Ода); English translation: "Ode to Liberty"
- 1829 – "Ja vas ljubil..." ("Я вас любил..."); English translation: "I Loved You"
- 1831 – Klevetnikam Rossii (Клеветникам России); English translation: "To the Slanderers of Russia"

=== Novels ===
- 1827 (1837) – Arap Petra Velikogo (Арап Петра Великого); English translation: The Moor of Peter the Great (unfinished)
- 1829 (1857) – Roman v pis'max (Роман в письмах); English translation: A Novel in Letters (unfinished)
- 1833–36 – Kapitanskaja dočka (Капитанская дочка); English translation: The Captain's Daughter
- 1831 (1836–37) – Roslavlev (Рославлев); English translation: Roslavlev (unfinished)
- 1832–33 (1841) – Dubrovskij (Дубровский); English translation: Dubrovsky (unfinished)

=== Short stories ===
- 1830 (1831) – Povesti pokojnogo Ivana Petroviča Belkina (Повести покойного Ивана Петровича Белкина); English translation: The Tales of the Late Ivan Petrovich Belkin
  - Vystrel (Выстрел); English translation: The Shot, short story
  - Metel' (Метель); English translation: The Blizzard, short story
  - Grobovščik (Гробовщик); English translation: The Undertaker
  - Stancionnyj smotritel' (Станционный смотритель); English translation: The Stationmaster, short story
  - Baryšnja-krest'janka (Барышня-крестьянка); English translation:The Squire's Daughter, short story
- 1830 (1837) – Istorija sela Gorjuxina (История села Горюхина); English translation: The Story of the Village of Goryukhino (unfinished)
- 1833 (1834) – Pikovaja dama (Пиковая дама); English translation: The Queen of Spades, short story
- 1834 – Kirdžali (Кирджали); English translation: Kirdzhali, short story
- 1835 (1837) – Egipetskie noči (Египетские ночи); English translation: The Egyptian Nights, unfinished short story

=== Non-fiction (selection) ===
- 1833–34 – Istorija Pugačeva (История Пугачева); English translation: A History of Pugachev, study of the Pugachev's Rebellion
- 1829–35 (1836) – Putešestvie v Arzrum (Путешествие в Арзрум); English translation: A Journey to Arzrum, travel sketches
- 1835 – Istorija Petra (История Петра); English translation: History of Peter (unfinished)

== See also ==
- Anton Delvig
- Aleksandra Ishimova
- Fyodor Petrovich Tolstoy
- Literaturnaya gazeta
- Pushkin Prize
- Vasily Pushkin
- Vladimir Dal
- Kapiton Zelentsov, contemporary illustrator of Pushkin's novels
- UN Russian Language Day
