= Miriam Rakhmankulova =

Mariam Mannanovna Rakhmankulova (20 November 1901 – 8 February 1990) was a Soviet composer, mezzo-soprano and translator who was awarded an Honored Artist of the Tatar Autonomous Soviet Socialist Republic medal and an Order of Lenin medal.

== Biography ==
Rakhmankulova was born in Kazan, Russia. She studied music at the Moscow Conservatory and at the Tatar Opera, where her teachers included E. Petrenko and B. Schechter. She was a mezzo-soprano with the Kazan Philharmonic Orchestra, on the radio, and from 1938 to 1959 with the Tatar State Opera and Ballet Theatre. Rakhmankulova translated song texts into Tatar, and recorded folk music as a singer.

== Works ==
Rakhmankulova's works include:

=== Incidental music ===
- Elka (for radio; play by D. Appakov)
- Tapkyr Yeget (play by D. Appakov)

=== Orchestra ===
- Kechkene Khikaya (string orchestra)
- Malenkaya Skazka (string orchestra)

=== Piano ===
- Pesnya Bez Slov

=== Vocal ===
- "Akh, Pesni Moi" (text by Ahmed Erikeyev)
- "Chechek" (text by Alexander Pushkin)
- "Kolybelnaya" (folk tune)
- "Nasha Pesnya" (traditional text)
- "Pesnya o Kube" (text by M. Khusain)
- Prazdnik Elki (for chorus; text by K. Nedzhmi)
- "Priezhaite v Gosti" (text by M. Khusain)
- "Tsvetok" (text by Alexander Pushkin)
- Two Tatar Folk Songs
