= House-Museum of Alexander Pushkin =

House-Museum in Moldova

- Casa-muzeu „Aleksandr Pușkin”
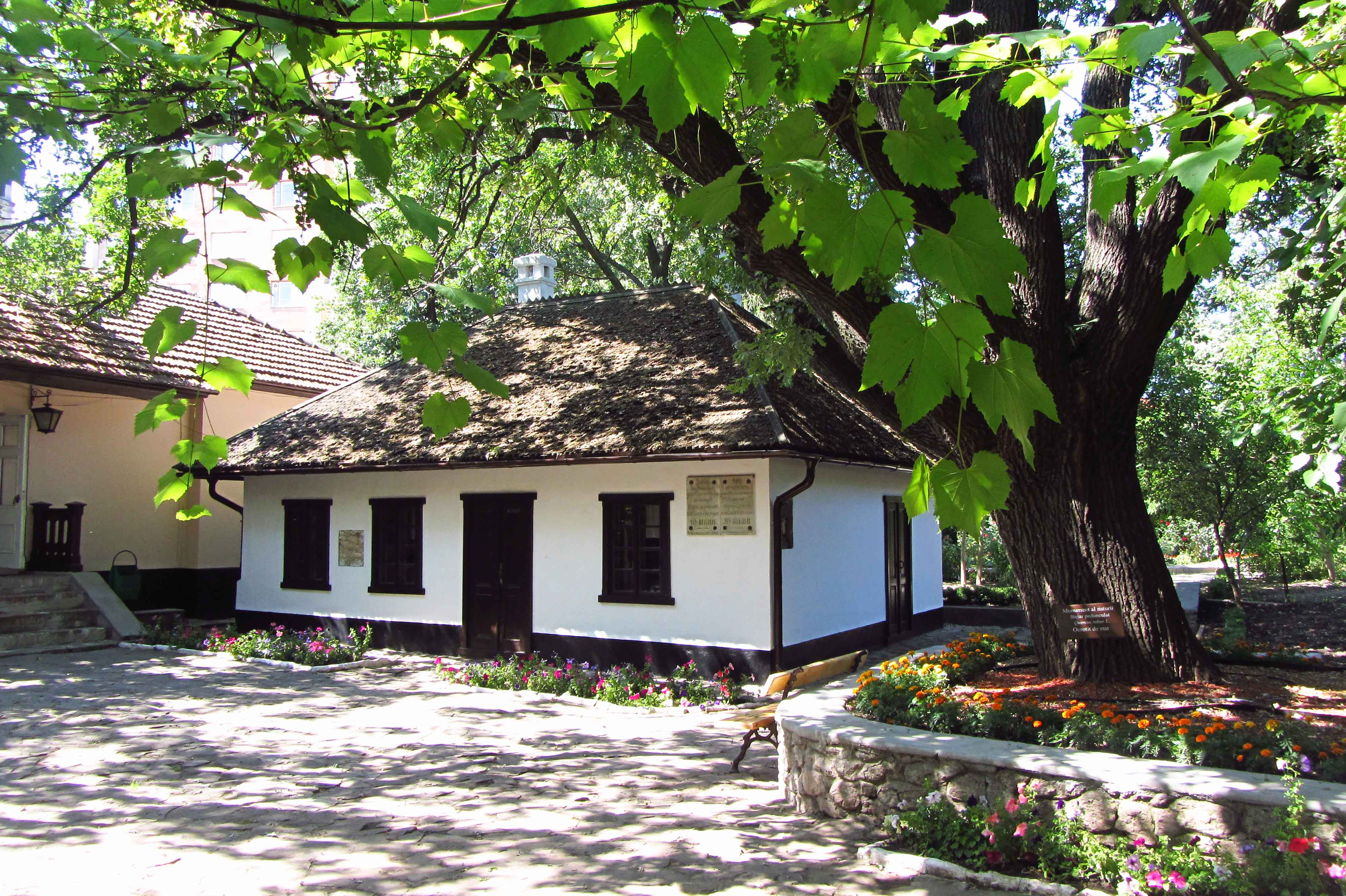
- Established: 1948
- Location: 19 Anton Pann Str., Chișinău, Republic of Moldova
- Coordinates: 47.0318°N 28.8367°E
- Type: House-Museum

House-Museum of Alexandr Pushkin (Romanian: Casa-muzeu „Aleksandr Pușkin”) is a museum and architectural monument in Moldova of national value. It is included in the Register of monuments of history and culture of the municipality of Chișinău.

The building is where the Russian poet Alexandr Pushkin lived for three months after arriving in the capital of tsarist Bessarabia on September 21, 1820. The house, which at the time belonged to the merchant Naumov, was granted museum status on 10 February 1948. In total, Pushkin spent three years (1820–23) on the territory of the governorate, having previously been exiled here by the tsarist administration.

== Gallery ==
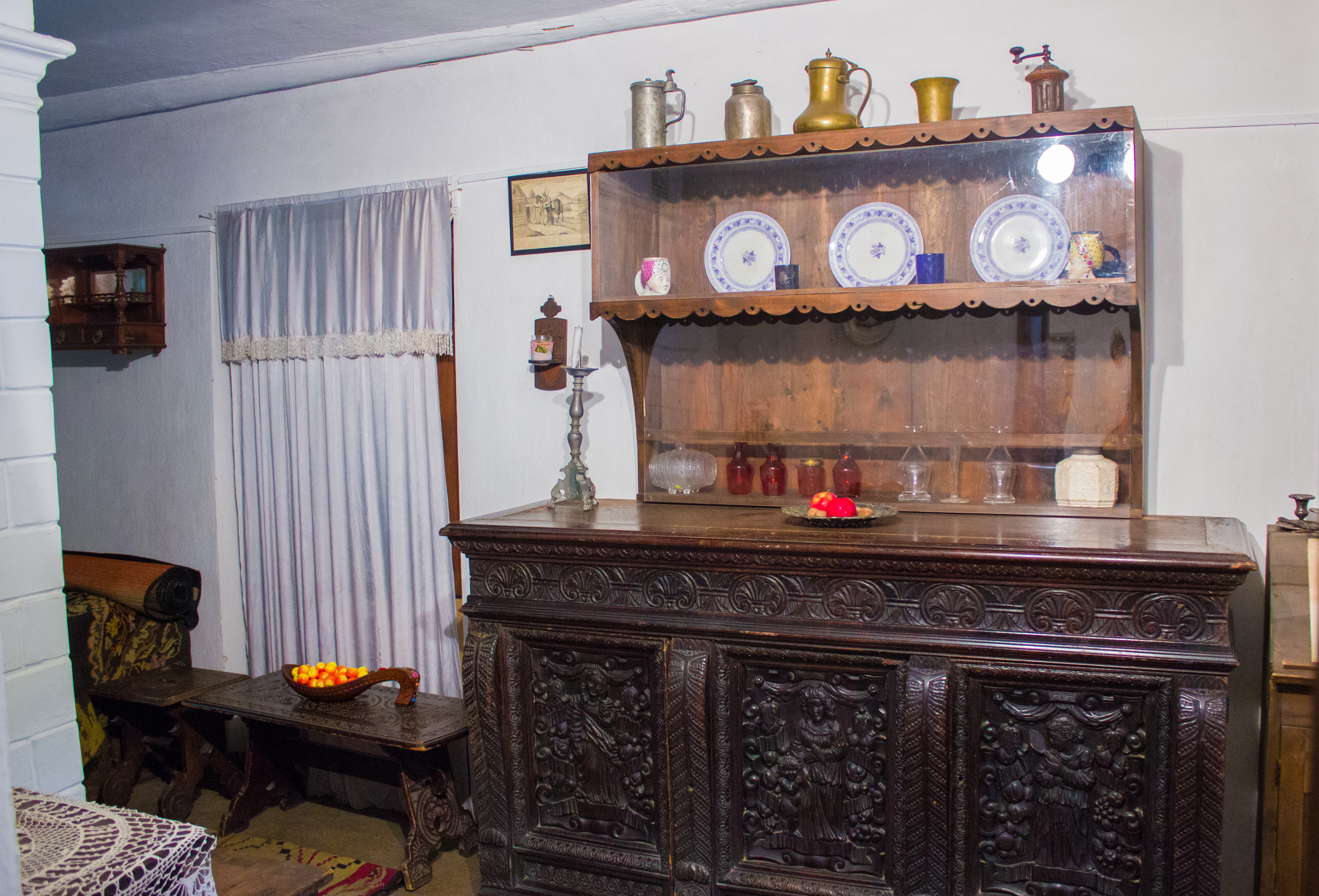

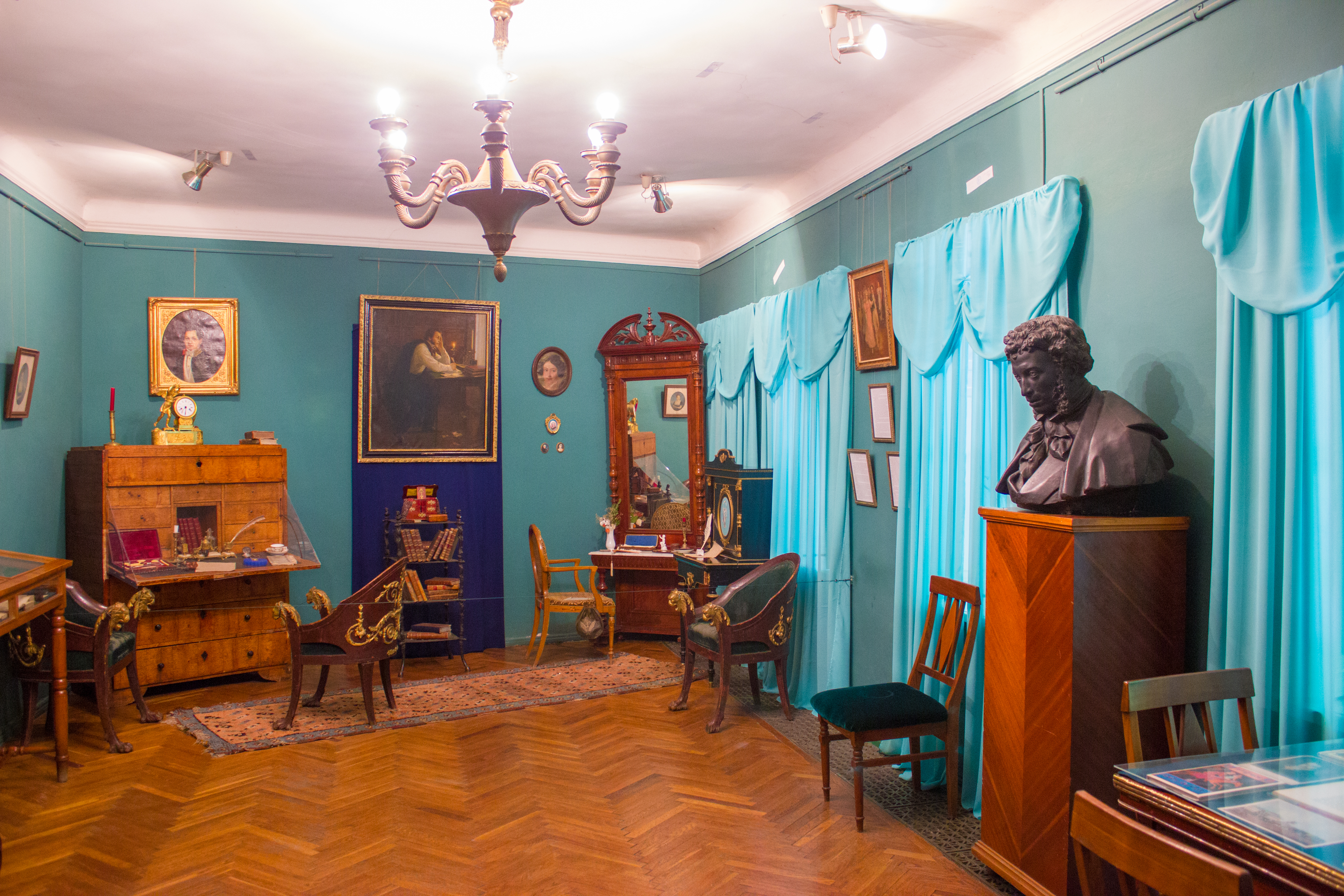

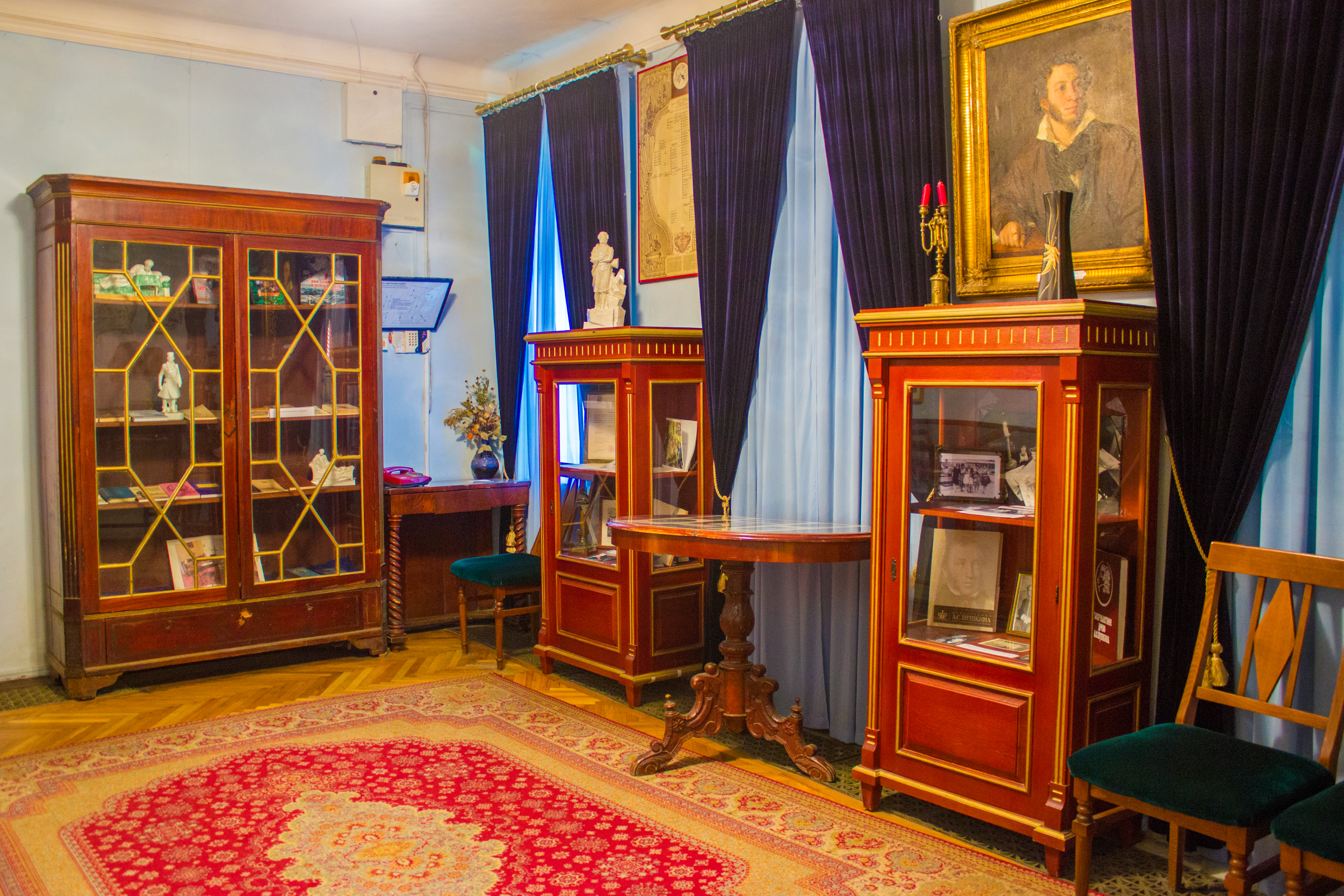

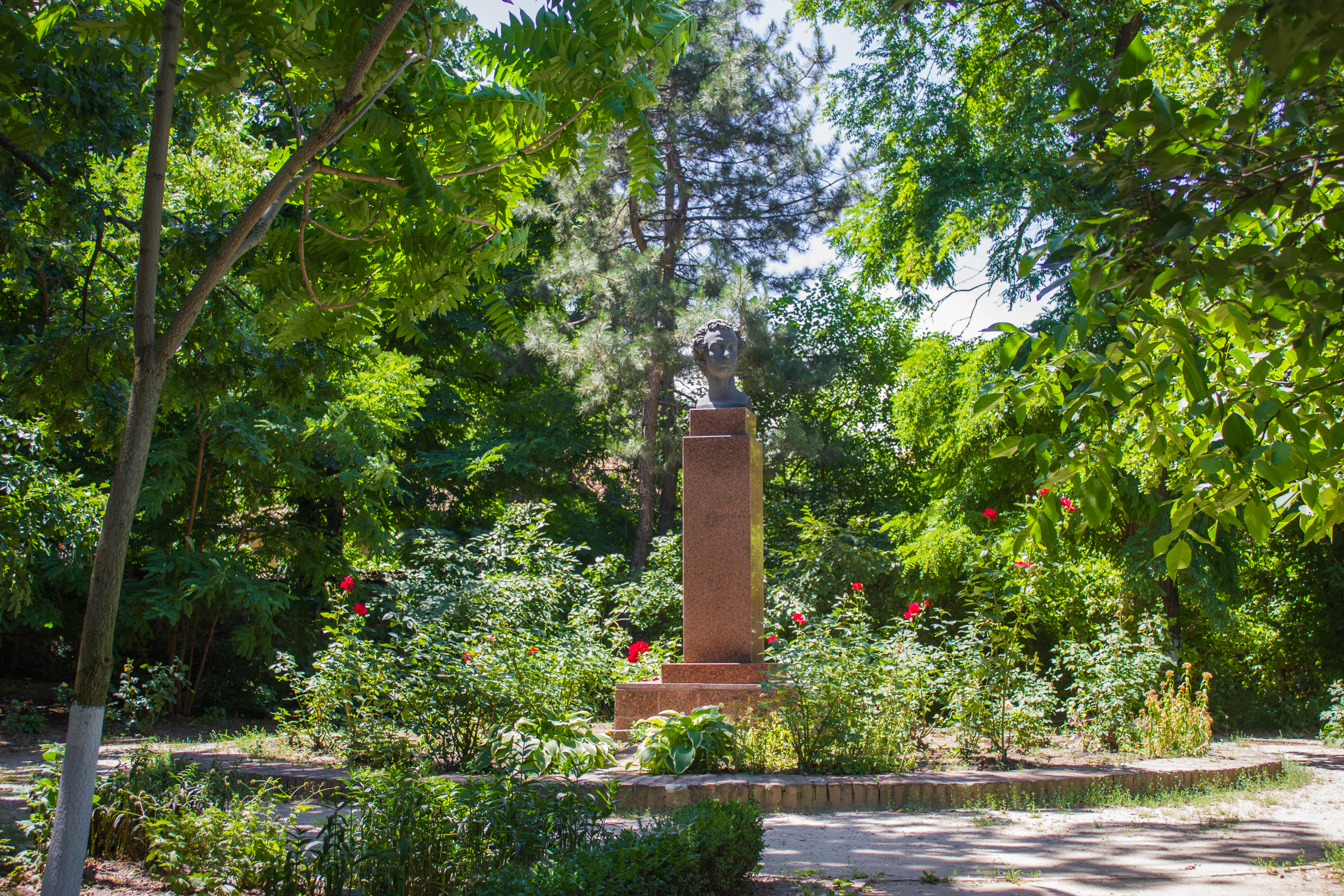

== See also ==
- Alley of Classics, Chișinău
- Ștefan cel Mare Central Park
- National History Museum of Moldova
