= Maria Semyonovna Zavalishina =

Russian composer

Maria Semyonovna Zavalishina (Russian: Мария Семеновна Завалишина; 26 December 1903 – 3 July 1991) was a Soviet composer and teacher. She studied composition at the Leningrad Musical College, graduating in 1929. She was head of the music department of the Northern Siberian Dramatic Theatre, and an inspector of the Odessa (Ukraine) Art Department. She founded and was headmistress of the Music School in Sovetsk, Kirov Oblast, Russia. She was on the Artistic Committee of the Moldavian Soviet Socialist Republic (today known as the Republic of Moldova), and lectured at the Odesa Conservatory. In 1951, she began serving as a deputy artistic director of an unspecified orchestra. Zavalishina composed incidental music for over 80 plays and films.

== Life ==
Maria Semyonovna Zavalishina was born 26 December 1903, in Saint Petersburg, Russia. She studied composition at the Leningrad Musical College under Porfiriy Molchanov, graduating in 1929. From 1929 to 1934 she was head of the music department of the Northern Siberian Dramatic Theatre, and from 1938 to 1941, an inspector of the Odessa (Ukraine) Art Department. She studied composition at the Conservatory of Odessa during 1939. From 1941 to 1944 she founded and was headmistress of the Music School in Sovetsk, Kirov Oblast, Russia. From 1944 to 1955 she was on the Artistic Committee of the Moldavian Soviet Socialist Republic (today known as the Republic of Moldova) and from 1945 to 1951 lectured at the Odesa Conservatory. In 1951, she began serving as a deputy artistic director of an unspecified orchestra. Zavalishina composed incidental music for over 80 plays and films.

Zavalishinae was awarded the Certificate of Honor of the Presidium of the Supreme Soviet of the Ukrainian SSR, and was a member of the Union of Composers of Ukraine.

She died on 3 July 1991, and is buried in Lviv.

Her compositions include:

== Chamber ==
- Elegy, Romance (horn and piano; 1962)
- Happy Piece (oboe and piano; 1964)
- Melody (violin and piano; 1938)
- Melody, Nocturne, Little Waltz (cello and piano; 1963)
- Romance (violin and piano; 1938)
- Three (violin and piano; 1969)

== Incidental music ==
- for more than 80 plays and films

== Opera ==
- Esli Druzya (1966)

== Operetta ==
- Kol I Druzie in Three Acts For Children (Muzichna Ukraina, 1978)

== Orchestra ==
- Igrushki, Children's Suite (1939)

== Piano ==
- Children's Album (1952)
- Pro Zaiku, Six Pieces (1964)
- Suite (1937)
- Ten Children's Pieces (1961)

== Vocal ==
- arrangements of various folk and children's songs
- Idut Kommunisty (A. Chepurov; a cappella chorus; 1951)
- K Portretu (Lermontov; with piano; 1938)
- Lipka (P. Voronko; a cappella chorus; 1950)
- Nad Dniepnom (I. Radchenko; with piano; 1951)
- Pyatnadtsat Let (Pushkin; with piano; 1937)
- S Toboiu Mysi Moya (Goethe; with piano; 1939)
- Trostnik (Lermontov; with piano; 1938)
