= Death of the Poet =

Poem by Mikhail Lermontov

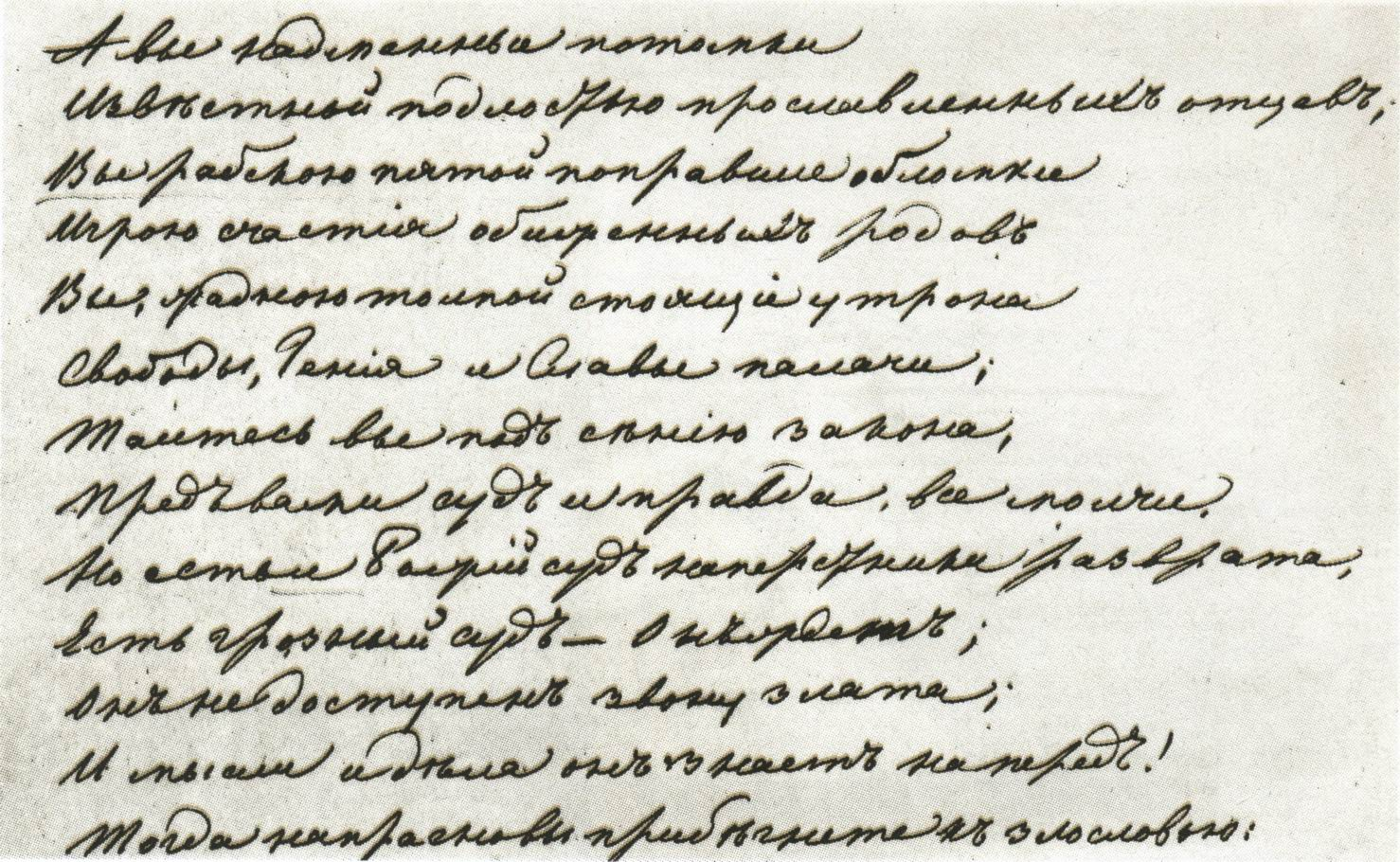
A handwritten copy of "Death of the Poet", presumably one of the many contemporary copies which were circulated. From the State Literary Museum, Moscow.

"Death of the Poet" (Russian: Смерть Поэта) is an 1837 poem by Mikhail Lermontov, written in reaction to the death of Alexander Pushkin.

Pushkin was mortally wounded in a duel on January 27, 1837, and died on the 29th. Lermontov began his first formulation of the poem (ending with the phrase "...his lips forever sealed") as soon as he heard of the event, and within a short time copies of the poem began to be circulated in St. Petersburg.

Within days the doctor Nikolai Arendt visited Lermontov (who was ill) and told him the details of the death of Pushkin, whom Arendt had tried to save. Arendt's story likely influenced Lermontov's development of the poem.

Pyotr Vyazemsky described the reaction of Arendt to the death of Pushkin: "Arendt, who had seen many deaths in his life, on the battlefields and in sickbeds, departed with tears in his eyes from his bedside and said that he had never seen anything like it, such patience with such suffering."

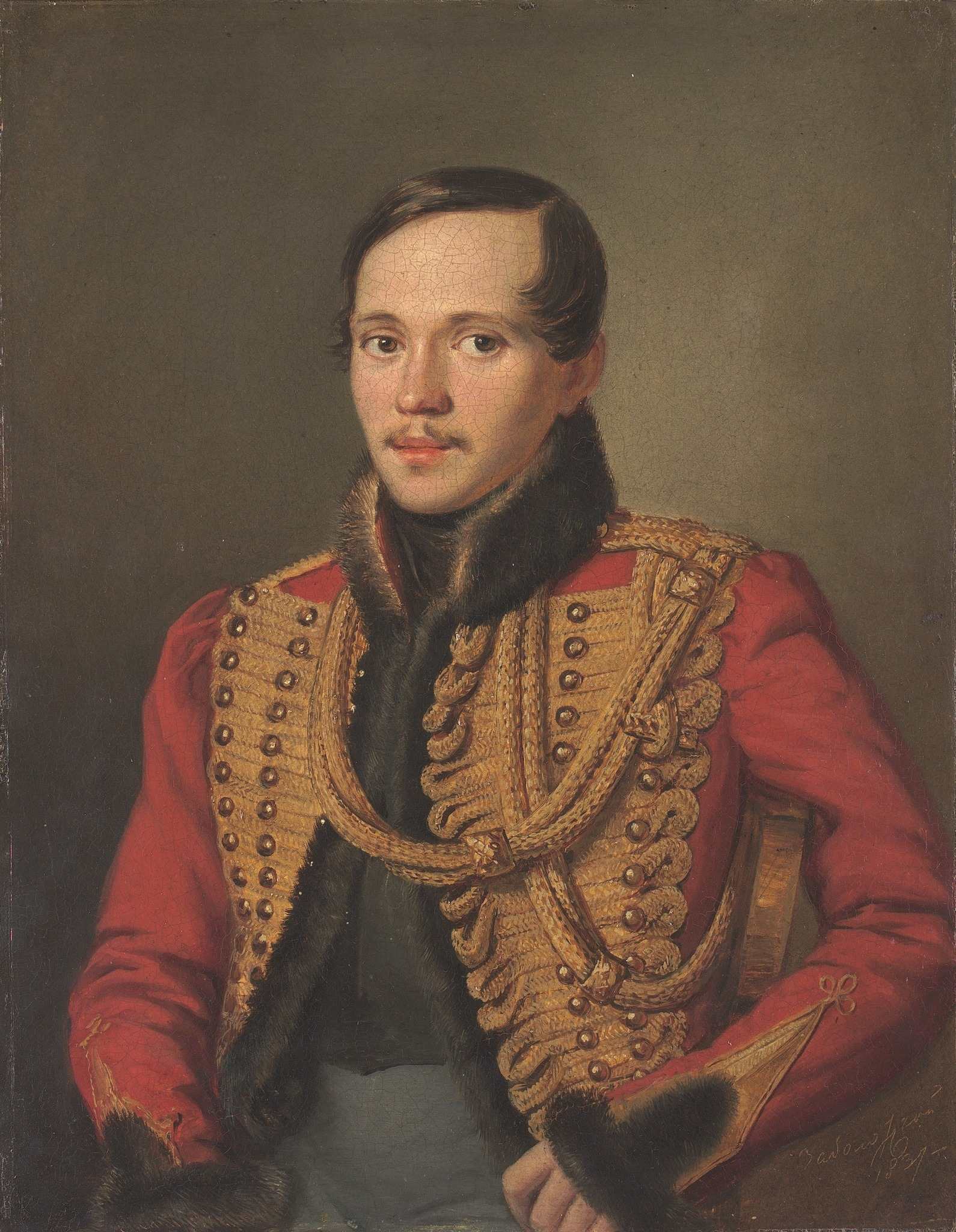
Mikhail Lermontov. 1837 portrait by Pyotr Zabolotsky.

On February 7, Lermontov added an acerbic final sixteen lines (beginning "And you, the arrogant descendants of infamous scoundrels...") to the poem. These lines called for divine justice upon the heads of the "greedy horde" of the court aristocracy, whom Lermontov condemned as executioners of freedom and the true culprits of the tragedy. Hand-written copies of this version of the poem circulated among the Petersburg intelligentsia and came to the attention of the authorities. Those final sixteen lines were regarded by the authorities as seditious free thinking, and Lermontov was arrested. After a brief investigation he was, on the orders of the Emperor Nicholas I, exiled to a regiment in the Caucasus on February 25.

The poem was only published long after Lermontov's death. The first publication (a German translation under the title "Lermontov's lament at the grave of Alexander Pushkin") was in 1852 in Friedrich von Bodenstedt's Mikhail Lermontoff's Poetic Legacy. The first published English translation (under the title "On the death of Pushkin") was in 1856, in Alexander Herzen's London periodical Polar Star.
