= Mozart and Salieri (play) =

1830 poetic drama by Alexander Pushkin

Mozart and Salieri (Russian: Моцарт и Сальери, romanized: Motsart i Salyeri) is a poetic drama by Alexander Pushkin. The play was written in 1830 as one of his four short plays known as Little Tragedies (Маленькие трагедии), and was published in 1832. Based on one of the numerous rumours caused by the early death of Mozart, it features only three characters: Mozart, Antonio Salieri, and a non-speaking part in the blind fiddler whose playing Mozart finds hilarious, and Salieri is appalled by. It was the only one of Pushkin's plays that was staged during his lifetime.

The relationship between the two composers was also dealt with in Szenen aus Mozarts Leben, an 1832 singspiel by Albert Lortzing.

Mozart and Salieri was the inspiration for Peter Shaffer's 1979 play Amadeus, which Shaffer adapted for the 1984 film of the same name.

== Adaptations ==
- 1897 – Mozart and Salieri, opera by Nikolai Rimsky-Korsakov
- 1979 – Little Tragedies, a 1979 Soviet television miniseries
