= To the Slanderers of Russia =

1831 patriotic poem by Alexander Pushkin

- by Alexander Pushkin
- Original title: Клеветникам России
- Written: 1831
- First published in: 1831
- Country: Russia
- Language: Russian
- Genre: Ode
- Publication date: 1831

Full text
- ru:Клеветникам России (Пушкин) at Wikisource

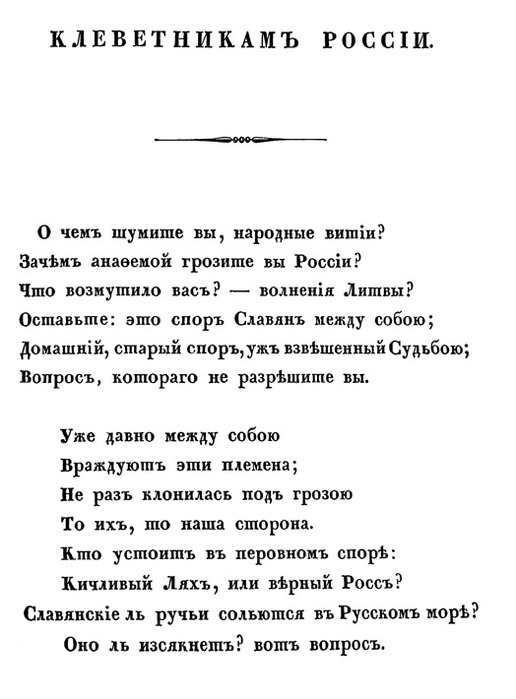

"To the Slanderers of Russia" (Russian: Клеветникам России, romanized: Klevetnikam Rossii) is a patriotic poem by Alexander Pushkin, published in 1831.

== Synopsis ==
The poem was written during the 1830–1831 Polish uprising. The immediate reason for writing it was that some members of the French parliament had called for French armed intervention on the side of Polish insurgents against the Russian army. In the poem, Pushkin explains that from the Russian point of view the uprising is just a part of the ages old quarrel between relatives (Slavs). He tells the French to leave Slavs alone because the eventual outcome of all quarrels between Slavs must be decided between Slavs themselves. He says that the French parliamentarians don't understand Slavs or Slavic languages, they seek a fight simply because they hate Russia for defeating Napoleon. He dares them to attack Russia in reality, not just in words, saying that in case of a military attack the whole Russian country will rise against the invaders.

The poem had mixed reception in Russian society: it was lauded by government and nationalists, but criticized by liberal intelligentsia.

Adam Mickiewicz published the reply poem Do przyjaciół Moskali ("To Friends Moskals", at the end of part 3 of the cycle Dziady), where he accused Pushkin of betrayal of their formerly common ideals of freedom, as expressed by the Decembrists. Pushkin started writing a reply, He Lived Among Us, published only posthumously.
