= Ode to Liberty (poem) =

Poem written by the Russian poet Alexander Pushkin

- by Alexander Pushkin
- Original title: Вольность, Ода
- Written: 1817
- Country: Russia
- Language: Russian
- Subject: Liberty
- Form: Ode

"Ode to Liberty" is a poem written by Alexander Pushkin. Upon graduation from the Lycee, Pushkin publicly recited the poem, one of several that led to his exile by Tsar Alexander the First.

Authorities summoned Pushkin to Moscow after the poem was found among the belongings of the rebels from the Decembrist Uprising (1825).

== Poem ==
English translation

Run, hide from my sight,
Oh weak queen of Cythera!
Where are you, where are you, storm of kings,
Proud singer of Freedom? —
Come, tear the wreath from me,
Smash the delicate lyre...
I want to sing Freedom to the world,
And strike vice upon thrones.

Reveal to me the noble path
Of that exalted Gaul,
To whom, amid glorious woes,
You inspired bold hymns.
Children of fickle Fate,
Tyrants of the world! Tremble!
And you, take heart and heed,
Rise up, fallen slaves!

Alas! Wherever I cast my gaze —
Whips everywhere, chains everywhere,
The deadly disgrace of laws,
The helpless tears of bondage;
Everywhere, unjust Power
In the thick mist of prejudice
Has settled — the dreadful Genius of Slavery
And the fatal passion for Glory.

Only there, above the royal head,
The suffering of peoples does not lie,
Where the holy Liberty stands firm
In powerful union with laws;
Where their strong shield is extended to all,
Where, gripped by faithful hands,
The sword of citizens glides
Without distinction over equal heads.

And crime from on high
Is struck down by righteous force;
Where their hand is incorruptible,
Neither by greedy avarice nor by fear.
Rulers! The crown and throne
Are given to you by the Law — not by nature;
You stand above the people,
But the eternal Law stands above you.

And woe, woe to the nations,
Where it slumbers carelessly,
Where either the people or the kings
Can rule by their own law!
I call you as a witness,
O martyr of glorious errors,
Who, in the tumult of recent storms,
Laid down your royal head for your ancestors.

Louis ascends to his death,
In view of silent descendants,
With his disheveled head bowed
To the bloody block of Treachery.
The Law is silent — the people are silent,
The criminal axe falls...
And behold — the villainous purple
Lies upon the shackled Gauls.

Despotic Villain!
I hate you and your throne,
With cruel joy I see your downfall,
The death of your children.
Nations read on your brow
The seal of a curse,
You are the terror of the world, the shame of nature,
A reproach to God on earth.

When over the gloomy Neva
The midnight star shines,
And the carefree head
Is burdened by peaceful sleep,
The thoughtful poet gazes
At the ominously sleeping, mist-shrouded
Deserted monument of the tyrant,
The palace cast into oblivion —

And hears Clio's dreadful voice
Behind these terrible walls,
Caligula's final hour
He vividly sees before his eyes,
He sees — adorned with ribbons and stars,
Intoxicated by wine and malice,
The secret assassins approach,
Boldness on their faces, fear in their hearts.

The unfaithful sentry is silent,
The drawbridge lowered silently,
The gates open in the dark night
By the hand of hired treachery...
Oh shame! Oh horror of our days!
Like beasts, the Janissaries invade!...
Inglorious blows fall...
The crowned villain perishes.

And today, learn, O kings:
Neither punishment, nor rewards,
Neither the blood of dungeons, nor altars
Are reliable protections for you.
Bow your heads first
Under the reliable shelter of the Law,
And the liberty and peace of the people
Will become the eternal guardians of the throne.

Russian original

Беги, сокройся от очей,
Цитеры слабая царица!
Где ты, где ты, гроза царей,
Свободы гордая певица? —
Приди, сорви с меня венок,
Разбей изнеженную лиру...
Хочу воспеть Свободу миру,
На тронах поразить порок.

Открой мне благородный след
Того возвышенного галла,
Кому сама средь славных бед
Ты гимны смелые внушала.
Питомцы ветреной Судьбы,
Тираны мира! трепещите!
А вы, мужайтесь и внемлите,
Восстаньте, падшие рабы!

Увы! куда ни брошу взор —
Везде бичи, везде желе́зы,
Законов гибельный позор,
Неволи немощные сле́зы;
Везде неправедная Власть
В сгущённой мгле предрассуждений
Воссела — Рабства грозный Гений
И Славы роковая страсть.

Лишь там над царскою главой
Народов не легло страданье,
Где крепко с Вольностью святой
Законов мощных сочетанье;
Где всем простерт их твёрдый щит,
Где сжатый верными руками
Гражда́н над равными главами
Их меч без выбора скользит

И преступленье свысока
Сражает праведным размахом;
Где не подкупна их рука
Ни алчной скупостью, ни страхом.
Владыки! вам венец и трон
Даёт Закон — а не природа;
Стоите выше вы народа,
Но вечный выше вас Закон.

И го́ре, го́ре племенам,
Где дремлет он неосторожно,
Где иль народу иль царям
Законом властвовать возможно!
Тебя в свидетели зову,
О, мученик ошибок славных,
За предков в шуме бурь недавных
Сложивший царскую главу.

Восходит к смерти Людови́к
В виду безмолвного потомства,
Главой развенчанной приник
К кровавой плахе Вероломства.
Молчит Закон — народ молчит,
Падёт преступная секира...
И се — злодейская порфира
На галлах скованных лежит.

Самовластительный Злодей!
Тебя, твой трон я ненавижу,
Твою погибель, смерть детей
С жестокой радостию вижу.
Читают на твоём челе
Печать проклятия народы,
Ты ужас мира, стыд природы,
Упрёк ты Богу на земле.

Когда на мрачную Неву
Звезда полуночи сверкает,
И беззаботную главу
Спокойный сон отягощает,
Глядит задумчивый певец
На грозно спящий средь тумана
Пустынный памятник тирана,
Забвенью брошенный дворец —

И слышит Клии страшный глас
За сими страшными стенами,
Калигуллы последний час
Он видит живо пред очами,
Он видит — в лентах и звездах,
Вином и злобой упое́нны
Идут убийцы потае́нны,
На лицах дерзость, в сердце страх.

Молчит неверный часовой,
Опущен молча мост подъёмный,
Врата отверсты в тьме ночной
Рукой предательства наёмной...
О стыд! о ужас наших дней!
Как звери, вторглись янычары!...
Падут бесславные удары...
Погиб увенчанный злодей.

И днесь учитесь, о цари:
Ни наказанья, ни награды,
Ни кров темниц, ни алтари
Не верные для вас ограды.
Склонитесь первые главой
Под сень надёжную Закона,
И станут вечной стражей трона
Народов вольность и покой.
