= Theodore Ritch =

Russian tenor

Theodore Ritch

Theodore Ritch (aka Theodore Reich, aka Fjodor Rich) (1894 in Odessa – 1943) was a Russian tenor.

== Career ==
In 1925, he appeared at the Orchestra Hall in a recital at Chicago Civic Opera. While in Paris in March 1926, he sang Grigorij at the Opéra, while possibly based in Yugoslavia. In 1927, he sang in Paris with Maria Kusnetsova's Russian Opera ensemble and toured Europe with them. In 1928, he sang the role of Dmitri in Boris Godunov at the Paris Opera. In 1929, he appeared at the Teatro Colon in Buenos Aires and at Covent Garden in London. In the same year, he sang in the English premiere of Sadko at the Lyceum Theatre in London.

In Chicago in 1929–30, he sang the part of Léopold in La Juive with Rosa Raisa, Charles Marshall, and Alexander Kipnis. He also sang the King of the Fools in Louise with Mary Garden, Rene Maison, Maria Claessens, and Vanni Marcoux. The following season (1930–31), he sang Ramon in La Navarraise; Gaston in Hamilton Forrest's "Camille" with Mary Garden and Charles Hackett; and also Cassio in Otello with Charles Marshall, Claudia Muzio, and Vanni-Marcoux. In 1932, he performed in Rome in the premiere night of Borodin’s Prince Igor. In 1937, he was in Ariane et Barbe-bleue at the Royal Opera House.

Recordings exist of arias from Tosca and Manon.

He retired in Paris, where he appears to have evaded the rafle du Vél' d'hiv in July 1942, but was arrested in 1943 and sent to Drancy. He died on a train headed for a concentration camp, presumably Auschwitz, in Poland.

== Recordings ==
- mp3 ♪ Puccini - 'Tosca': "E lucevan le stelle" ♪ (Opera Nederland webpage, with bio in Dutch and photo).
