= Russian conquest of the Caucasus =

19th-century conquest of the Caucasus by the Russian Empire

- Part of the Russo-Caucasian conflict
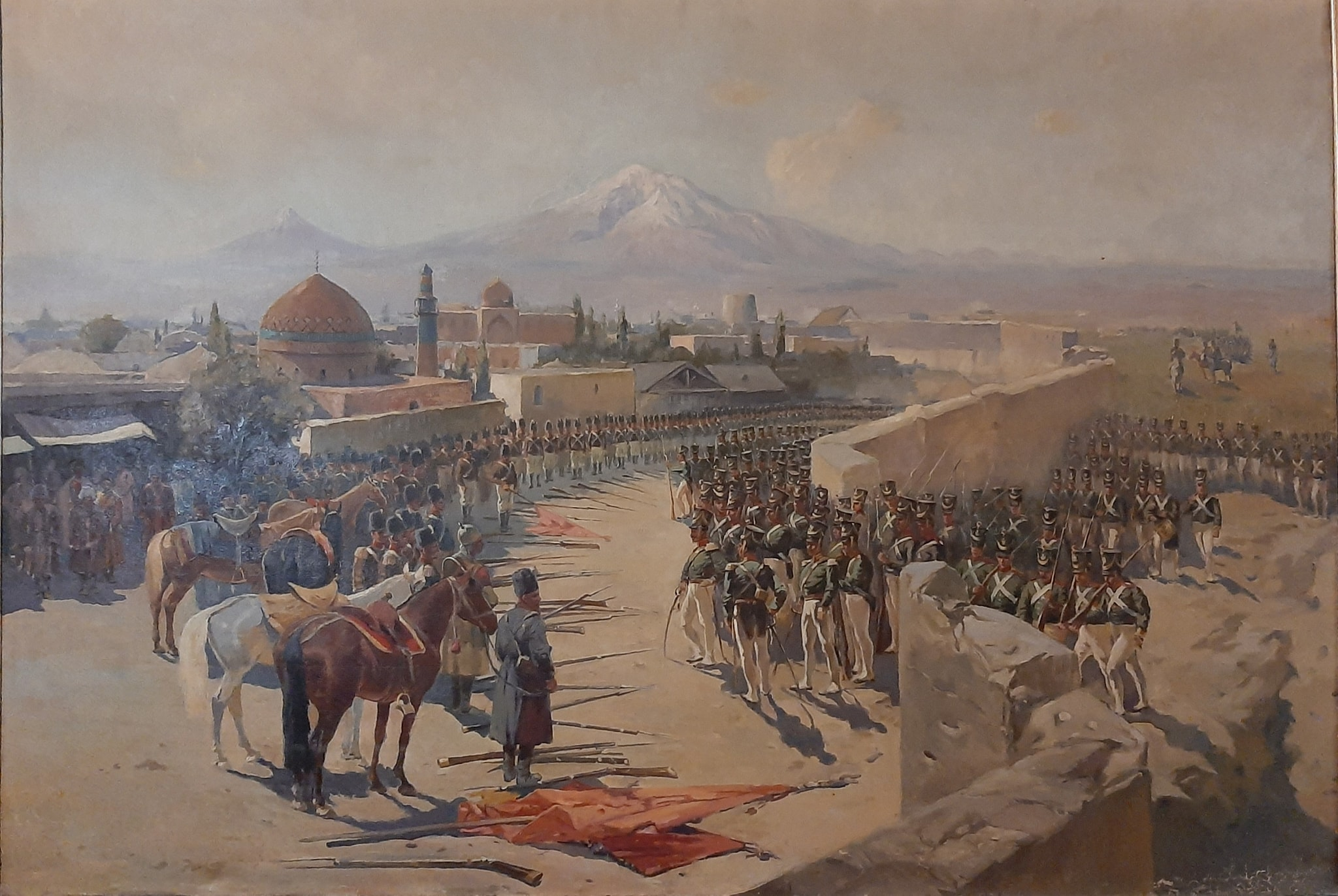
- Capture of Erivan (modern day Yerevan), 1827
Date	1800–1864 (64 years)
Location	Caucasus
Result	Russian victory
Territorial changes	Russia annexes North Caucasus and Transcaucasia

The Russian conquest of the Caucasus mainly occurred between 1800 and 1864. The Russian Empire sought to control the region between the Black Sea and Caspian Sea. South of the mountains was the territory that is modern Armenia, Azerbaijan, Georgia, and parts of Iran and Turkey. North of the mountains was the North Caucasus region of modern Russia. The difficult conquest of the intervening mountains is known as the Caucasian War. Multiple wars were fought against the local rulers of the regions, as well as the dominant powers, the Ottoman Empire and Qajar Iran, for control. By 1864, the last regions were brought under Russian control.

== Early history ==
=== The Rus' ===
The Rus' first appeared in the Caucasus region in the 9th century, initially as traders along the Volga trade route. From the late 9th century until c. 1041 (Note: "Sometime during the reign of Hasan Ibn Zaid, ruler of Tabaristan (r. 864–884), the Rus sailed into the Caspian Sea and unsuccessfully attacked the eastern shore at Abaskun. This was probably a raid on very small scale (...) Great raids, however, took place in c. 913, in 943, in 965 and in c. 1041.") several raids were carried out around the Caspian Sea by the Rus'. During the 943 expedition, the Rus' rowed up the Kura deep into the Caucasus, defeated the forces of Marzuban bin Muhammad, and captured Bardha'a, the capital of Arran.

=== Before the 19th century ===
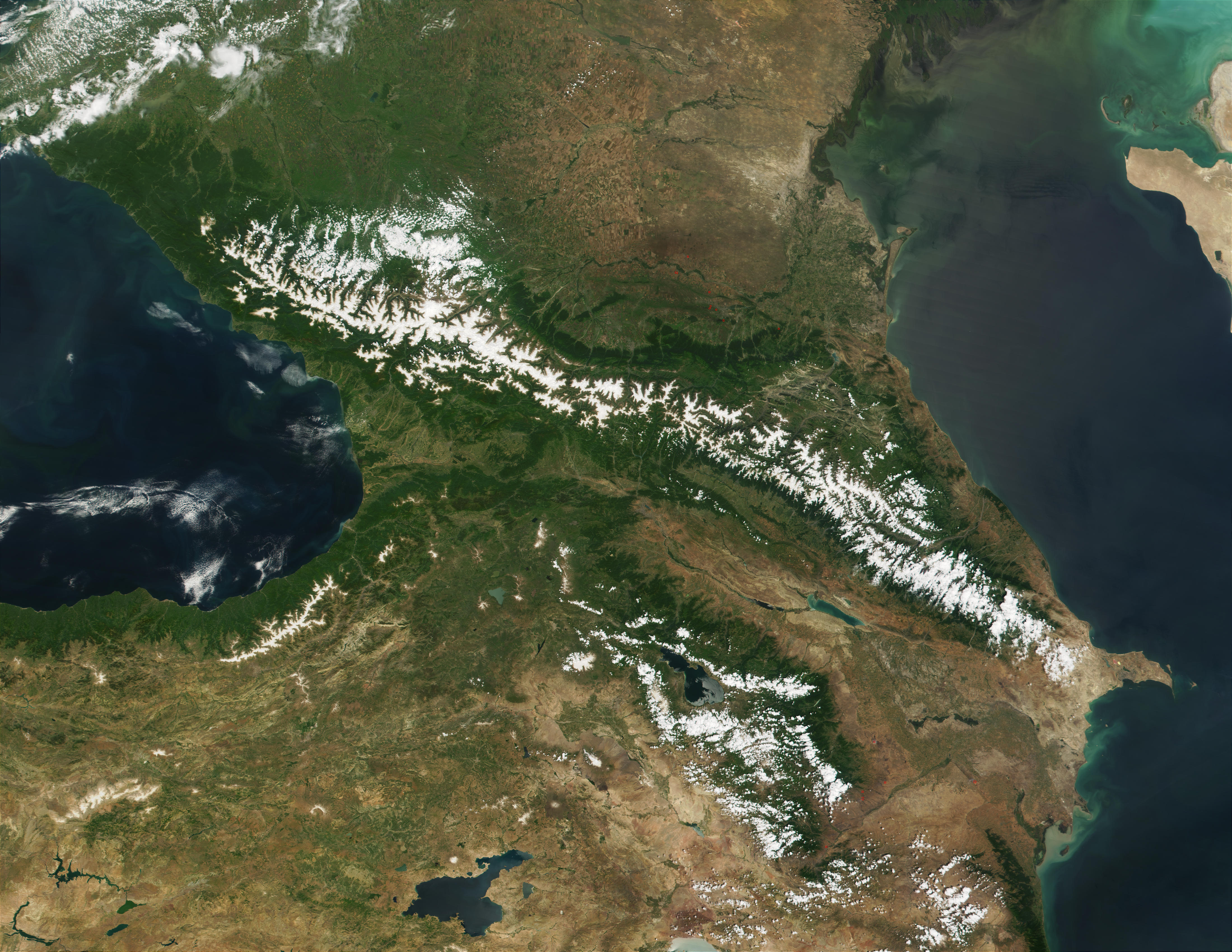
The Caucasus from space

Approximate dates of Russian control. Mouseover for name.
Early Russian fort;
Free mountaineers
Georgia from Persia.
Khanate from Persia
from Turkey
Georgia from Turkey
1878-1918

From the mid-16th century, there was an isolated group of Cossacks on the Terek River, and by around 1550, Cossacks were established on the Don River. Astrakhan was conquered in 1556, giving Russia a base at the north end of the Caspian Sea. They soon made an alliance with Kabardia and built a fort at the mouth of the Sunzha River. After about 1580 Russia disengaged from the Caucasus region for about 200 years, holding Astrakhan and slowly pushing settlement south toward the Black Sea.

During the Russo-Persian War of 1651-1653, several engagements saw Persian and Persia-allied troops fighting against Russian troops and warriors backed by or allied to the Russian Empire, including Cossacks. During the Russo-Persian War (1722–1723), Peter the Great conquered the west and south shore of the Caspian, but the land was later returned via the treaties of Resht and Ganja with the aim of cementing a Persian-Russian alliance against the Ottoman Empire. In 1775, after a Russian explorer had died in captivity, Catherine the Great sent a punitive expedition which briefly captured Derbent. During the Persian expedition of 1796, Russia again conquered the west coast of the Caspian, but the expedition was withdrawn after Catherine's death in November 1796 by her son and successor Paul I.

Underlying all of this was the slow and steady expansion of the Russian population southward from its original heartland in Muscovy. By around 1800, Russia was in a position to push soldiers and colonists into the Caucasus region.

== South of the mountains ==
Russia annexed eastern Georgia in 1800. By 1806, Pavel Tsitsianov had expanded this bridgehead from the Black Sea to the Caspian and gained the Caspian coast. In 1813, Persia was forced to recognize the loss of its northern territory, comprising modern-day southern Dagestan, eastern Georgia, and most of what is now the Azerbaijan. In 1818-1826, Aleksey Petrovich Yermolov tightened the noose around the mountains, but much of this was soon lost. In 1828, Russia took what is modern-day Armenia, Nakhichevan, and Talysh from Persia. The two Turkish wars had few results.

=== Background ===
From the days of the Roman Empire, Transcaucasia was usually a borderland between two empires, often centered in Constantinople and Persia. Areas would shift from one empire to the other, their rulers would have varying degrees of independence and the common people suffered much from the wars. Local rulers were often vassals of one empire or the other, but this could vary from complete subjection to a few empty words. Much depended on the size and proximity of the suzerain's army. By around 1750, the area was divided between Turkish and Persian vassals. The western two-thirds was inhabited by Georgians, an ancient Christian people, and the eastern third mostly by Azeris, Turkic Muslims who emerged as a people at an uncertain date. Russia had long held Astrakhan at the north end of the Caspian and was pushing close to the Black Sea. There were also Cossacks along the Terek River who would soon grow into the North Caucasus Line.

=== Annexation of Eastern Georgia ===
Caucasus about 1775
Georgia sub Persia
Khanate sub Persia
Turkish
Georgia sub Turkey
Turkish coastal fort.

In 1762, Heraclius II of Georgia joined the two eastern parts of Georgia into the Kingdom of Kartli-Kakheti. It was a Persian vassal, but Persia was very weak following the death of Nadir Shah. Due to that, Heraclius II was able to maintain a de facto independence through the entire Zand period. By this time Russia had a fair number of troops north of the mountains at such places as Mozdok. During the Russo-Turkish War (1768–74), fought mostly in the west, Catherine launched a diversion in the east and, for the first time, Russian soldiers crossed the Caucasus. In 1769, Gottlieb Heinrich Totleben with 400 men and 4 guns, crossed the Darial Pass to Tiflis. Next year, reinforced, he went to the Kingdom of Imereti, stormed Baghdati and took the capital of Kutaisi. After dispersing 12,000 Turks he laid siege to Poti on the coast. The business was mismanaged and Russian forces were withdrawn to the North Caucasus Line in the spring of 1772. In July 1783, the same year that Crimea was annexed, the king made himself a Russian rather than a Persian vassal (Treaty of Georgievsk). Pavel Potemkin sent 800 men to begin work on the Georgian Military Highway through the Darial Pass. By October 1783, he was able to drive to Tiflis in a carriage drawn by eight horses. On 3 November, two Russian battalions and 4 guns reached Tiflis on the new-made road. It was a gloomy day and the locals remarked that their new friends has brought their weather with them. The troops were soon withdrawn but their presence further provoked Persia. Agha Mohammad Khan Qajar was working to restore Persian power and saw the king of Georgia ("Gorjestan") as another disobedient wali. In 1795, he captured and sacked Tiflis (Battle of Krtsanisi). Viceroy Gudovich, who in January 1791 had arrived on the Line with 15 battalions of infantry, 54 cavalry squadrons, and 2 Cossack regiments, did nothing. Agha Mohammad was assassinated in 1797 while preparing a second invasion. The Russo-Persian War (1796) was, in part, a Russian response to the Persian sack and recapture of Tiflis.

In the summer of 1800, Fath-Ali Shah Qajar demanded that George XII of Georgia send his son to Teheran as a hostage. General Knorring, who commanded the Line, was told to prepare 9 infantry battalions. The Persians backed off but the Avar Khan Omar invaded anyway and was defeated by General Lazerev on the Alazani River. George XII, who was dying, offered the Russians increasing amounts of authority. Paul I of Russia responded by annexing the kingdom on 18 December 1800.

=== First years ===
Russian officials in Georgia were the envoy Peter Ivanovich Kovalensky and Generals Lazarev and Gotthard Johann von Knorring. In May 1801, the heir to the throne was removed and Lazarev became head of a provisional government with Knorring as commander in chief. In April 1802, the nobles took an oath to the Russian crown. Kovalensky wrote to the Shah demanding that Persia renounce all claims to Georgia. Fath Ali replied that eastern Georgia had always been Persian and announced his intention to send 60,000 soldiers north.

=== From sea to sea: Tsitsianov (1803–1806) ===
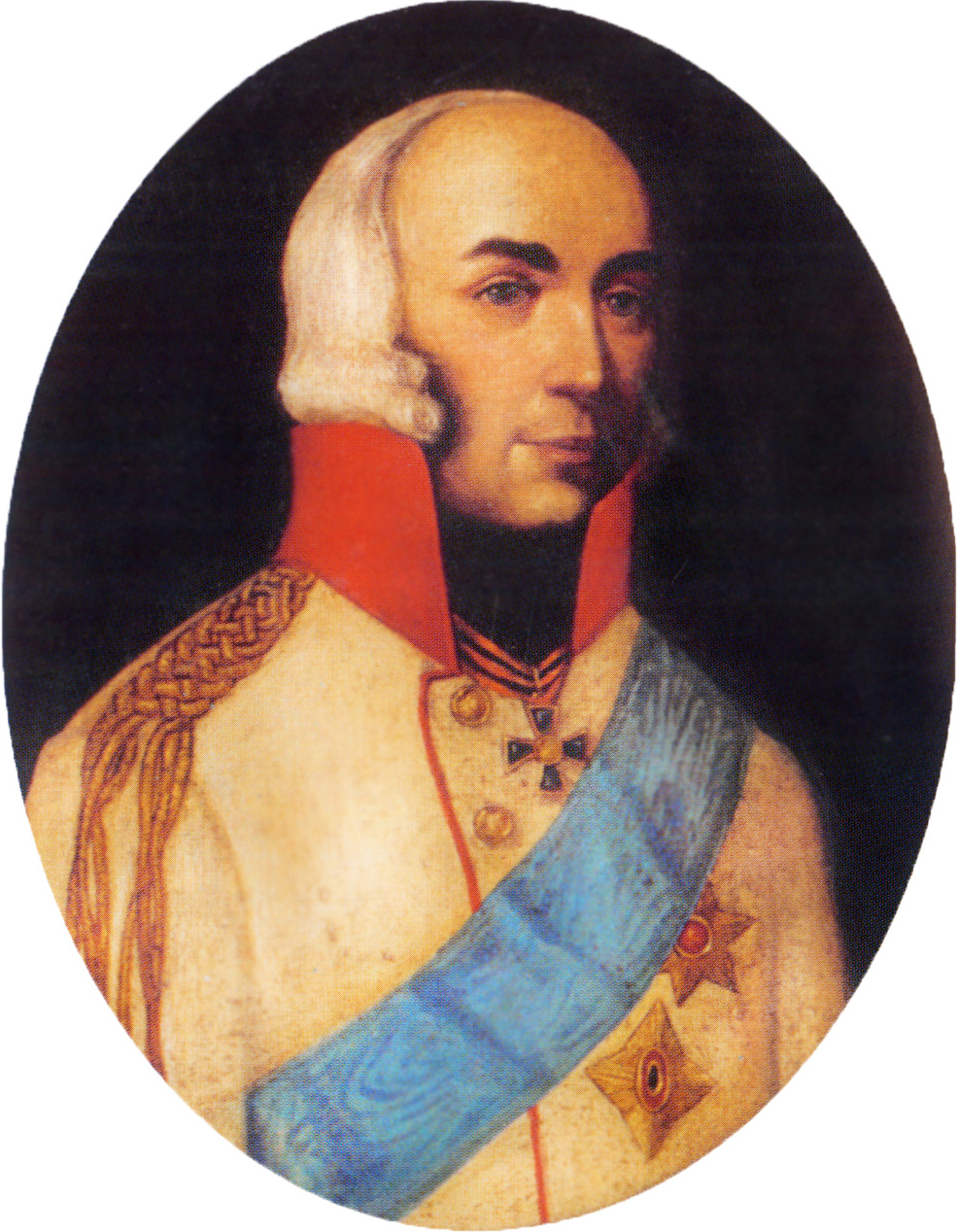
Tsitsianov who unified Georgia and won most of Transcaucasia for Russia.

In September 1802, Pavel Tsitsianov was appointed commander-in-chief of Georgia and Inspector of the Line and Governor-General of Astrakhan. He was descended from Georgian nobles (Tsitsishvili) who had fled to Russia with Vakhtang VI in 1724. He could see himself both a servant of the Czar and Georgian patriot, holding that only Russian power could protect Georgia from Persians, Turks, mountain raiders, and internal disunity. He arrived in early 1803. His first concern was to remove the remaining members of the royal family. Prince Aleksandre of Georgia had already gone over to the Persians. When General Lazarev went to arrest the late king's widow she stabbed him to death. (She was confined in a convent for 8 years and died in 1850.)

Unification of Georgia: In December 1803, the western Principality of Mingrelia became a Russian vassal. The Kingdom of Imereti now had Russians on both sides. After some military pressure, in April 1804, it became a Russian protectorate. Much of Georgia was now reunited after 400 years. The coastal forts like Poti remained Turkish. In March 1805, an expedition captured the Turkish fort of Anaklia on the Abkhaz border. Under Ottoman threat, Tsitsianov withdrew, calling it the unauthorised action of a subordinate. In 1810, Russia put its client on the throne of the Principality of Abkhazia.

Push east and south: In the spring of 1803, he subdued the Djaro-Belokani area and the Elisu Sultanate. Later General Gulyakov was killed fighting the Djaro-Belikanis. In January 1804 the Ganja Khanate (southeast of Georgia) was bloodily conquered. In the summer of 1804, Tsitsianov led 10,000 men against the Yerevan Khanate (south of Georgia). He besieged Yerevan; the Persians (30,000 men under Abbas Mirza) got behind him and after some fighting, he made a difficult withdrawal. This was the start of the Russo-Persian War (1804-1813). In May 1805, the Karabakh Khanate(south of Ganja) submitted. Abbas Mirza and 20000 men arrived, the garrison held out for three weeks until the 100 survivors cut their way out. Fath-Ali Shah Qajar with 40,000 men approached, thought better of it and retired. In 1805, Tsitsianov took over the Shuragel Sultanate, Shaki Khanate (May) and Shirvan Khanate (December). The Caspian Flotilla under General Zavalivshin laid siege to Baku but was driven off by the Khan of Quba. Tsitsianov went east with 1,600 men and 10 guns. He crossed the Shirvan Khanate, which he annexed on the way, and arrived before Baku before 8 February 1806. The town elders delivered him the keys to the city. He returned the keys asking to receive them from the khan in person. The khan rode out with an escort, Tsitsianov advanced with two other men and was shot dead. The guns of Baku opened up on the Russian army and Zavalivshin again chose to withdraw.

The disaster of Tsitsianov's death and Zavalivshin's apparent cowardice was retrieved by General Glazenap, who commanded the Line. He crossed the Aktash country to Tarki where the Shamkhal joined him. Knowing that the khan of Derbent was unpopular, the Shamkhal sent agents to stir up trouble. When the Russians crossed the border the khan was expelled by his own subjects and Derbent was occupied for the fourth and last time (22 June 1806). The campaign was interrupted by the new commander-in-chief Gudovich, who was perhaps growing incompetent. Glazenap was placed under General Bulgakov and it was Bulgakov who received the surrender of Quba and Baku.

Russia now held the area between the Black and Caspian Seas and had provoked a war with Persia.

=== War with Persia and Turkey (1804–1813) ===
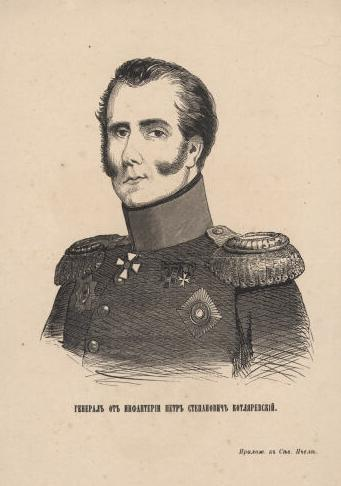
Kotlyarevsky, the hero of Akhalkalaki and Lenkoran whose victory ended the Persian war

During this period Russia was at war with Persia (1804–1813) and Turkey (1806–1912). Most Russian forces were tied up dealing with Napoleon and the main Russo-Turkish conflict was on the other side of the Black Sea. The Turkish war left the frontier unchanged and the Persian war forced Persia to recognize the Russian conquest of the eastern Transcaucasus and Caspian coast. Viceroys of the Caucasus during the war years were 1802: Pavel Tsitsianov, 1806: Ivan Gudovich 1809: Alexander Tormasov 1811: Philip Osipovich Paulucci 1812: Nikolay Rtischev.

The war with Turkey is of no concern since it left the border unchanged, although Russia did retain the Black Sea port of Sukhum-Kale. Russia might have accomplished something, but its soldiers were busy holding down the new-won Caucasus, fighting the Persians, fighting the Turks on the opposite side of the Black Sea, and watching Napoleon. Apart from military heroics, its main importance was to tie down troops that could have been used against Persia.

The first two years of the Persian war involved the conquest of the Khanates. In 1804, Russia took Ganja but was defeated by the Persians when it tried to take Yerevan. Next year it took Shaki and Karabakh. Persia sent an army to rescue Karabakh and was defeated. By early 1806 Shirvan and the Caspian coast were taken. Russia now had all the Persian territory it would ever get, except Talysh, Yerevan, and Nakhichevan.

The Persian front became quiet when the Turkish war started. In 1808, Gudovich failed to take Yerevan and resigned. In 1812, Abbas Mirza invaded eastern Karabakh, defeating the Russian garrisons. Pyotr Kotlyarevsky was sent east, defeated the Persians at Aslanduz, crossed the steppe and bloodily captured the capital of Talysh. In 1813, Persia signed the Treaty of Gulistan which recognized the Russian possession of the khanates.

Internally, Imereti, Guria, and Abkhazia were annexed or brought under more complete control, thereby completing the second phase of the unification of Georgia. A rebellion in eastern Georgia was put down. In 1811, the Russians were defeated in Quba and stormed the capital of the Kureen khanate. In 1812, the Ossets were driven back from Tiflis and a Dagestani army under Prince Alexander was defeated. In 1813, Simonovich went deep into the mountains and took Shatili, the chief stronghold of the Khevsurs on the upper Argun. With the end of the wars, the mountain chieftains and Georgian rebels became quiet, seeing no hope for support from the two Muslim empires.

=== The age of Yermolov (1816–1827) ===
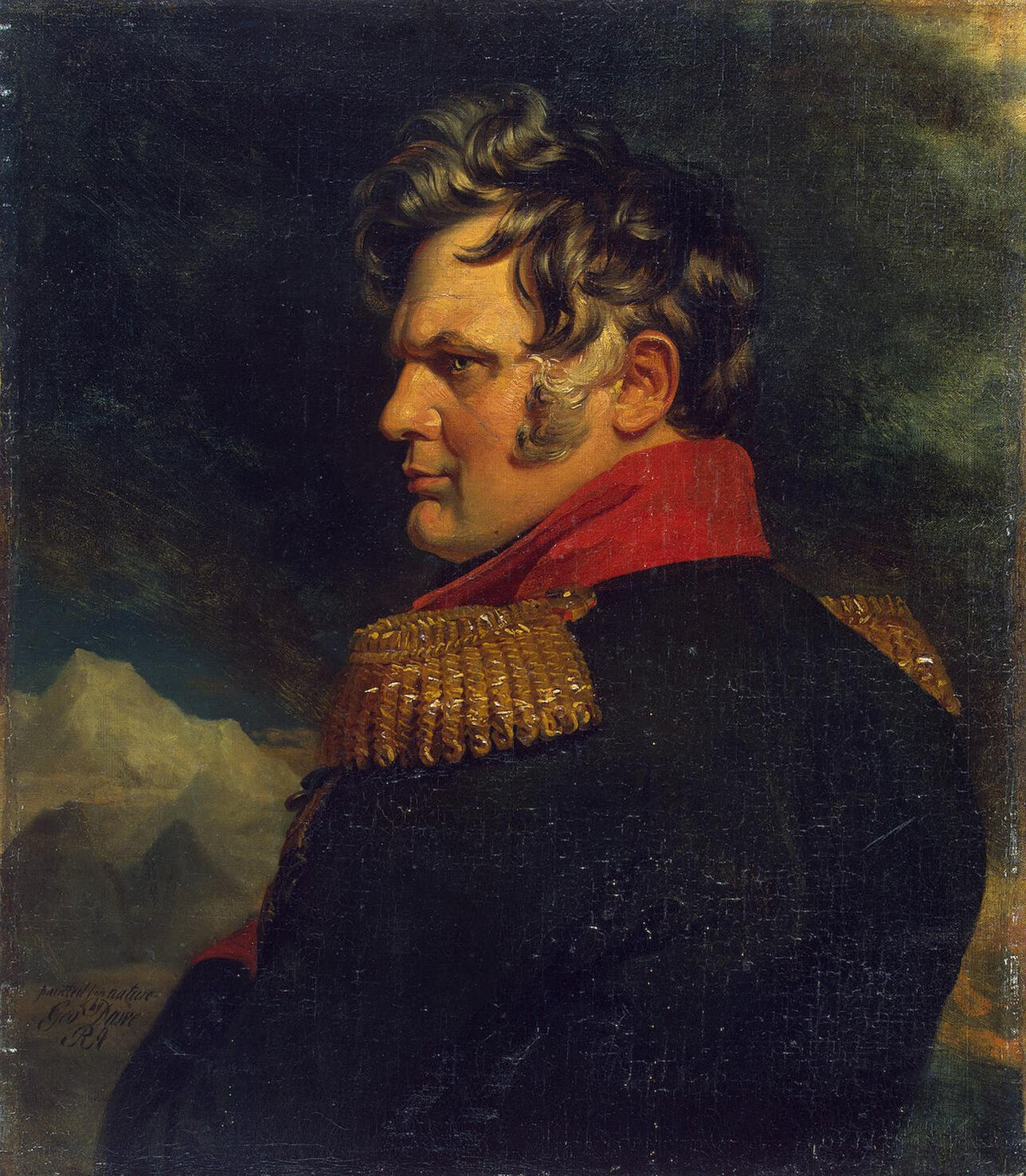
Yermolov began the conquest of the mountains.

Yermolov arrived in the autumn of 1816. He brought with him Velyaminov as chief of staff. Like many such people, Velyaminov was more intelligent and less charismatic than his chief and the two made a good pair. Velyaminov wrote the Memoir and the Commentary which outline the basic Russian strategy as a great siege. Some think Yermolov's harshness provoked the long and bloody Murid War, but during his rule, it appeared that he had subdued most of Dagestan and part of Chechnya. Before he could take charge he had to go to Persia and deal with the results of the recent war, which he did successfully (July 1817).

Russia, having gained control of the Transcaucasus and the Caspian coast, attention now turned to the intervening mountains. This meant primarily the high plateau of Dagestan and forest belt on the north slope of the mountains. His first concern was to strengthen the northern Line and push it further south. Three new forts were built: Grozny in 1818, Vnezapnaya in 1819 and Burnaya on the mountain above Tarki in 1821. They were connected by a line of smaller forts.

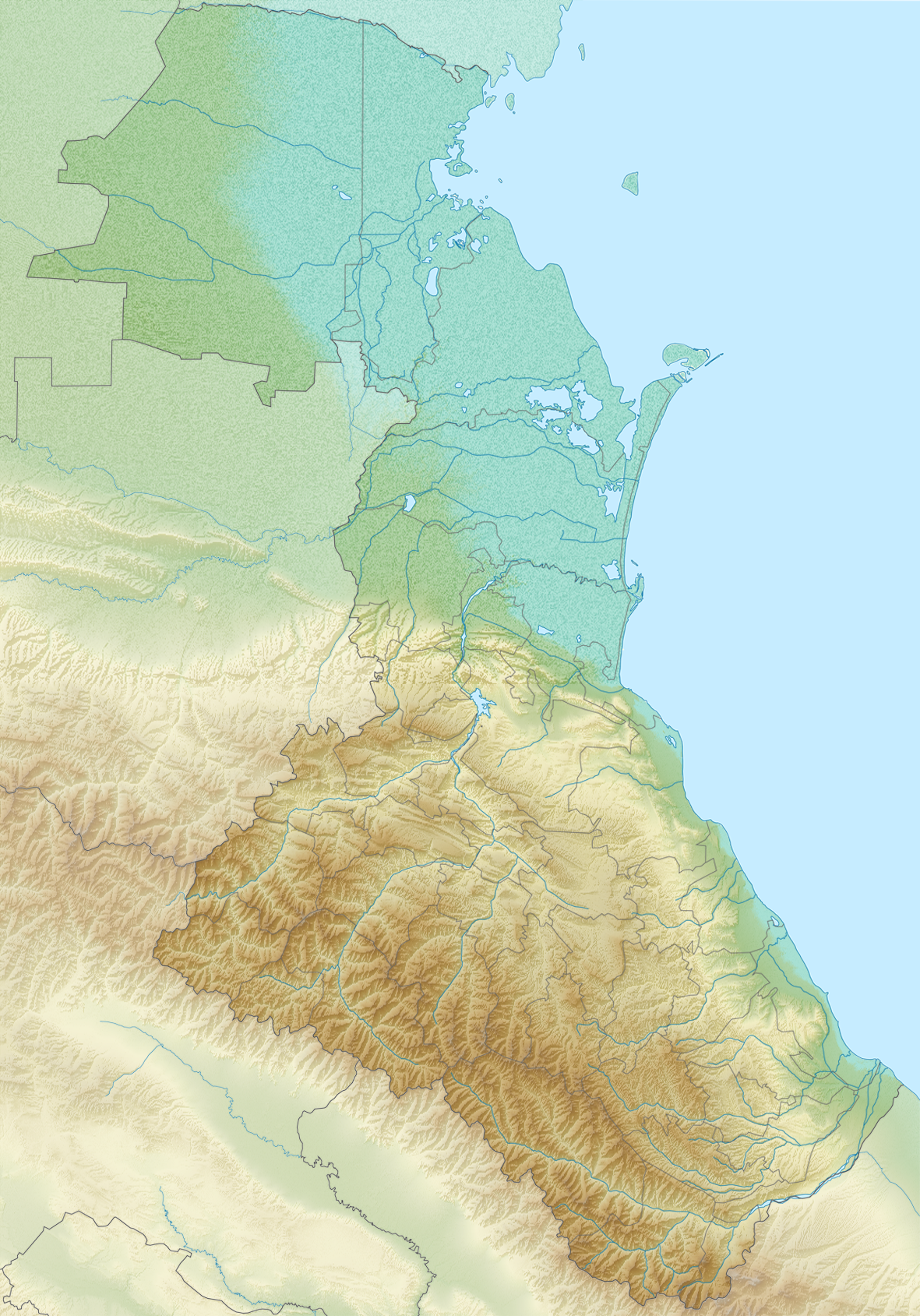
Yermolov in Dagestan and Chechnya
major khanate
minor khanate, principality or league
new fort
D Dadi_Yurt
G Gerzel
K=Kubachi

In 1818, the Dagestanis saw what was coming and formed an alliance: Avaria, Mekhtuli, Karakaitag, Tabassaran, Kazikumukh and Akusha. This led to the first Russian campaign into mountain Dagestan. Pestel advanced to Bashli in Karakaitag and was forced back to Derbent with a loss of 500 men. Yermolov moved south from Tarki to Mekhtulil, sacked the abandoned Paraul, stormed the capital (Djengutai) and abolished the Mekhtuli khanate. Bashli was retaken and destroyed and Yermolov returned to the Line. In the summer of 1819, the mountaineers rose again, mainly in the south. Valerian Madatov, who replaced Pestel, took Tabassaran and in October retook Bashli in Karakaitag. When the khan of Shaki died without a direct heir the Russians occupied Nukha and abolished the khanate. In Yermolov's own words, he obtained the khanate "by interpreting treaties as Mussulmans interpret the Koran, that is, according to circumstances." The Avar khan attacked Vnezapnaya, was defeated and replaced by his son.

About this time a number of eastern Chechens drove off some horses near Vnezapnaya. Yermolov chose to drive them back to their own country. On 15 September Dadi-Yurt was bloodily captured and the remaining clansmen fled west to the mountains. In November Yermolov and Madatov attacked Akusha. The elders came out to parley and were kept talking until late at night. When they left the Russians made a flanking maneuver and defeated them at Lavashi the next morning. The Akusha people, who had once defeated Nadir Shah, submitted and kept faith for seven years. In June 1820, it was the turn of Kazikumukh. Matadov crossed the mountains from Shirvan and defeated an estimated 20,000 men near Khosrek 23 km southeast of Kumukh. The khan fled to his capital but the inhabitants shut the gates against him and surrendered to the Russians. Leaving Kumukh the Russians received the submission of Kubachi, a free community famous for its weapon makers. Yermolov reported to the Tsar that the subjugation of Dagestan was now complete, even though the far western strip had not been touched.

Shirvan was annexed on 30 August 1820, the old khan fleeing to Persia. Yermolov spent the whole of 1821 in Russia. The Ottoman–Persian War (1821–1823) broke out, but Russia did not intervene and there were no territorial changes. In 1822, there was a dynastic dispute in Karabakh and the khanate was turned into a province. In 1823, Ammalat Bek, a nephew of the Shamkhal and a state prisoner, murdered his friend Colonel Verkhovsky while out riding and fled to Khunzakh but was rejected there. He soon gained many supporters. General Krabbe chased him, destroyed Karanai (just east of Shamil's Gimry), was defeated at Erpeli and withdrew. Yermolov appeared with a small additional force and his reputation was enough to cause the natives to submit. For the first time, Russian troops went into winter quarters in the mountains. About this time a certain Abdulla, a relative of the deposed ruler of Derbent, who lived in Kaitag, was accused of brigandage. Unable to capture him, General Krabbe put a price on his head. Someone placed a bomb in his house, killing Abdulla and 16 other people. This drew a rebuke from the Czar, but Yermolov defended his subordinate.

In 1824, a man named Beibulat started a new rebellion. He was supported by a holy man who claimed to have been visited by an angel. The rebellion spread from the Sulak to the Sunzha. General Grekov, a man reputedly harsher than Yermolov, marched hither and thither but could not suppress it. On the night of 7-8 July 1825, 2,000 rebels captured Amir-Haji-Yurt (on the Terek just east of Dadi-Yurt) and killed most of the garrison. Next day they besieged Gerzel-Aul. On the 15th, it was relieved by Grekov and Dmitry Lisanevich. The two generals demanded that the local leaders come to the fort to offer submission. 300 arrived, many of them armed, but no precautions were taken. Lisanevich began abusing them in the local language and calling out names from a list. The first two surrendered their kinzhals, but the third, Uchar Haji, refused to budge. When Grekov tried to disarm him by force Uchar stabbed him in the stomach killing him on the spot and then turned on Lisanevich before he was cut down. The dying Lisanevich cried out "Kill them!" and the soldiers fired on the fleeing natives, killing most of them. Yermolov arrived from Tiflis with 7,000 reinforcements, rearranged the fortifications, but little fighting took place. In early 1826 Yermolov engaged in the usual village-burning, forest-cutting, and skirmishing and the rebellion seemed to go quiet.

In December 1825, Alexander I died and was replaced by Nicholas I who seems to have been somewhat hostile to Yermolov. In July 1826, the Persians invaded Karabakh and Ganja. Yermolov, who was happy to fight tribesmen hesitated to attack the Persian army and asked Nicholas for two divisions. Nicholas sent one division and told Yermolov to invade Yerevan. Yermolov replied that this was impossible and Nicholas replied by sending out Ivan Paskevich. The two could not cooperate, Paskevich had the support of the Tsar and in late March 1827 Yermolov resigned.

=== War again (1826–1829) ===
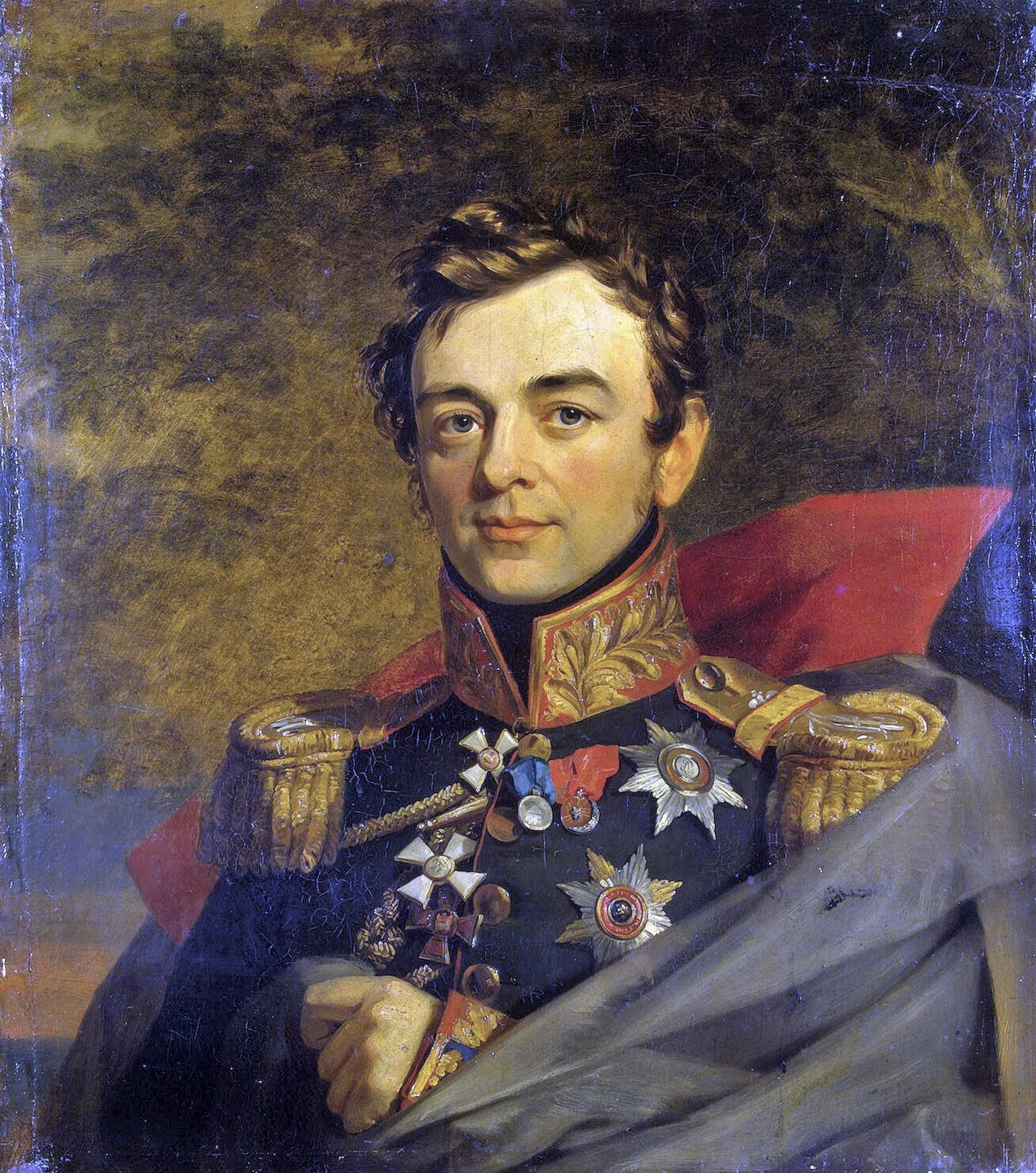
Paskevich who defeated Turks and Persians

In this period Russia again fought the two Muslim powers.

The Russo-Persian War (1826–28) broke out when Persia invaded the flat country on the east side of Karabakh and Ganja. Yermolov was replaced by the more aggressive Ivan Paskevich. By the end of 1827, he had conquered the khanates of Yerevan, Nakhichevan and Talysh, that is, modern Armenia and the southeast corner of Transcaucasia. Just after the conclusion of peace, Turkey declared war (Russo-Turkish War (1828–1829)), mainly because of Russian intervention in the Greek War of Independence. As usual, the Caucasus front was a sideshow to the main fighting in the Balkans. In 1828, Paskevich took two border forts and the Turkish city of Kars. In 1829, he pushed on to the larger city of Erzerum. Peace was made in September of that year. The treaty mainly concerned the Balkans, but on the Caucasus side, Russia returned most of the Turkish territory but kept the two border forts and the Black Sea ports of Poti and Anapa.

=== Later (1830–1994) ===
Attention now turned to the Murid War (1830-1859) in which the mountaineers of Dagestan and Chechnya united and held out until 1859. In the western mountains the long Russo-Circassian War continued. It ended in 1864 with the expulsion to Turkey of several hundred thousand Circassians. The Crimean War (1853-1856) changed little. In the Russo-Turkish War (1877–1878) Russia gained the province of Kars and the port of Batum. During World War I, Russia collapsed during the Revolution and the Turks pushed as far east as Baku but then withdrew when their own empire collapsed. In the post-war confusion, Turkey regained Kars. During World War II, the Nazis got a little beyond Maikop but were unable to reach the Baku oil-fields. After the war Russia tried and failed to take part of northern Persia. In 1991 Transcaucasia became independent as the states of Georgia, Armenia and Azerbaijan. In 1992, Abkhazia and South Ossetia became de facto independent of Georgia with Russian backing. In 1994, Nagorno-Karabakh was de facto taken from Azerbaijan by Armenia.

== Caspian coast ==
The west coast of the Caspian was held by a number of khanates nominally subject to Persia. After two abortive attempts, the coast was taken by Russia in 1805 and 1806. The southernmost khanate, Talysh, was not taken until 1826.

The east coast of the Caspian is mostly desert and need not concern us. From Astrakhan south to near Tarki the land is flat steppe or semi-desert and therefore nomad country. From near Tarki to near Baku, there is a narrow coastal plain backed by the high plateau of mountain Dagestan. From Baku to the Talysh Mountains the Kur-Araz Lowland is a dry steppe extending far inland. From about 1747 the area was controlled by a number of khanates more or less subject to Persia.

From the mid 16th century there was an isolated group of Cossacks along the lower Terek River. In 1556, Russia conquered Astrakhan and the governor of Astrakhan gained some control over the Terek Cossacks. In 1722, Peter the Great took advantage of Persian weakness and temporarily took over the west and south sides of the Caspian (Russo-Persian War (1722–1723)). When Persia grew stronger Russia returned the south coast in 1732 and the west coast in 1735. About 1747, following the campaigns of Nadir Shah, the area became organised into a number of khanates nominally subject to Persia. In the Russo-Persian War (1796) Russia conquered the west coast but quickly gave it up. Eastern Georgia was annexed in 1800. Then in 1803-1806, Russia pushed east from Georgia and south from Astrakhan and the Terek and took over most of the khanates. Some were abolished and some were slowly absorbed. The northernmost khanate, Tarki, was absorbed between 1786 and 1867. The southernmost khanate, Talysh, was not annexed until 1826. From that date, the Iranian border has not changed. In 1991, the coast was divided between Russian-controlled Dagestan and independent Azerbaijan.

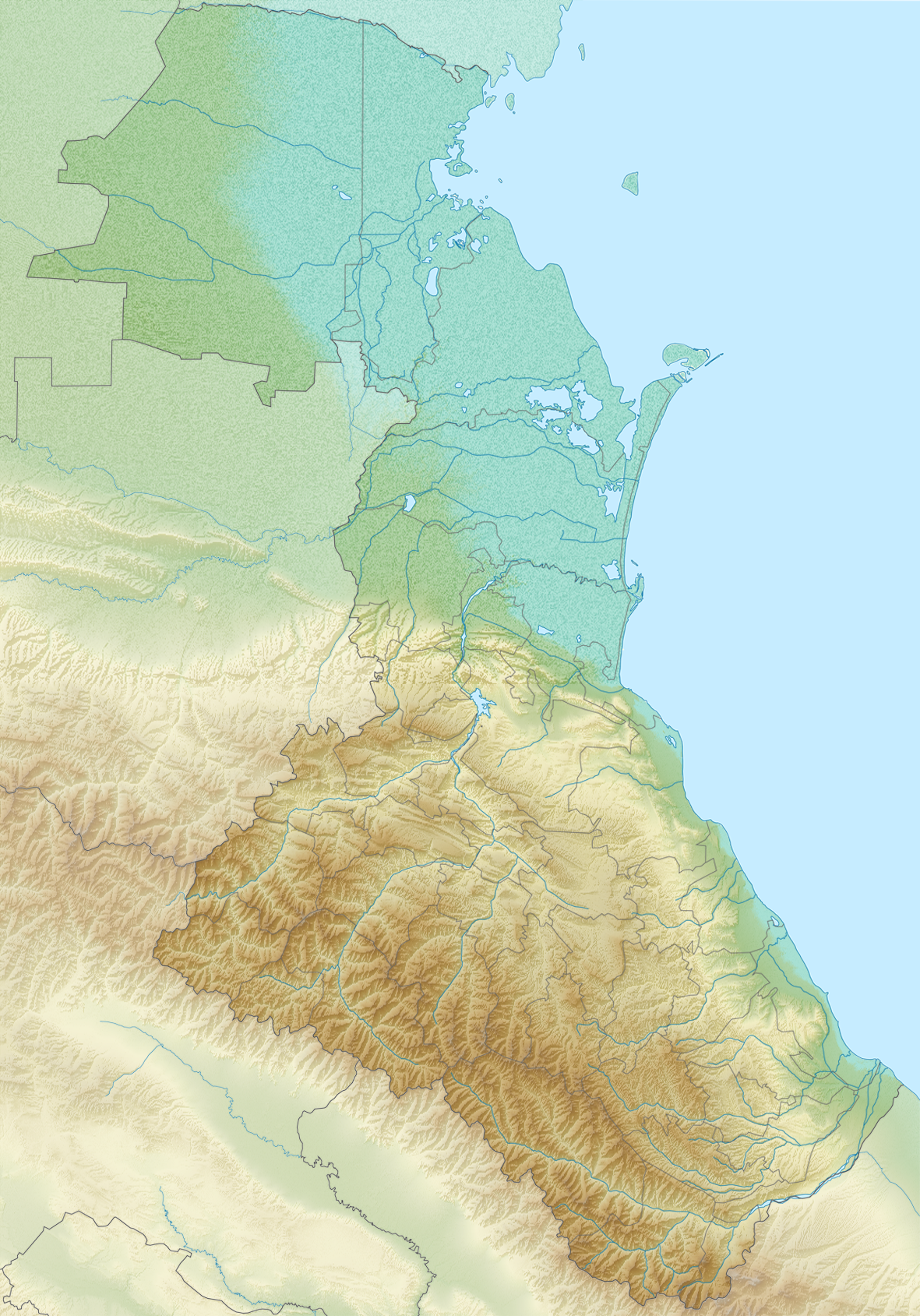
Khanates in Dagestan Coast

=== By place ===
- Terek River: The Terek Cossacks were settled here from perhaps 1520 or 1563. From the 16th to the 18th centuries it was the nominal border between Russia and Persia, although neither empire had much control over the region.
- Sulak River: Russia held the Holy Cross Fort in 1722–1735.
- Tarki was closest to Russia and far from Persia. In 1594, Tarki was captured by Boyar Khvorostin in support of a Georgian king, but he was driven off. The Shamkhalate of Tarki separated from Gazikumukh in 1642. In 1668 Stenka Razin was defeated by the Shamkhal. In 1722, Peter the Great was admitted to Tarki. In 1786 it accepted nominal Russian sovereignty. In 1806 the Shamkhal supported the Russian attack on Derbent. In 1821 the Russians built Fort Burnaya on the rocks above Tarki. In 1831, the town was briefly occupied by Kazi Mulla. In 1839, Burnaya was moved downhill to Nezovoye. In 1844, or before the port of Petrovsk was built which grew into Makhachkala, the current capital of Dagestan. The Shamkhalate was abolished in 1867.
- Kaitag, Karakaitag, or Qaytaq is not well documented in English. Its ruler was called the Utsmi and its chief towns Bashli and Kayakent. During Peter the Great's invasion, he sent four envoys to Kaitag. The Utsmi killed them and gathered 16,000 men to resist. They were defeated at "Utemish a few miles inland from Kayakent" and all the prisoners were hanged in revenge for the murder of the envoys. Around 1774, the Utsmi captured Samuel Gottlieb Gmelin, who died in captivity. Catherine sent General Medem on a punitive expedition which also captured Derbent (March 1775). In 1818 Colonel Pestel tried to take Bashli and was driven back to Derbent with a loss of 500 men. Bashli was taken by Valerian Madatov, the Utsmi fled to Akusha, his subjects renounced him and they took an oath to the Czar.
- Derbent is at a narrow point on the Caspian coast. This ancient walled city was long regarded as the northern gate of Persia. It had no natural harbor. The Derbent Khanate lasted from 1747 to 1806. Its rulers were a branch of the Avars. In 1765-1799, it was ruled by the larger Quba Khanate. It was captured four times by the Russians: 1) 1722: It was controlled by Russia from 1722 to 1735 following Peter the Great's campaign. 2) In 1775, in revenge for the death of Samuel Gottlieb Gmelin, Catherine the Great sent General Medem against the Utsmi of Karakaitag. The Utsmi was besieging Derbent. He was defeated, Derbent was occupied without much justification and then evacuated. 3) In 1796, it was captured by Valerian Zubov after 2-month siege. The khan, Shaykh Ali was made prisoner, made a daring escape, went to Gazikumukh, defeated a Russian detachment near Alpani, and raided the Russians until they withdrew in May 1797. 4) In 1806, to avenge the disaster at Baku, General Glazenap left the North Caucasus Line, crossed the Aktash country to Tarki and gained the Shamkhal's support. Shaykh Ali being unpopular with his subjects, the Shamkhal sent emissaries to stir up trouble. When the Russians crossed the border a rebellion broke out, the khan fled and Derbent was occupied without a shot (22 June 1806). From then on it was a Russian base and refuge when things were difficult in the interior.
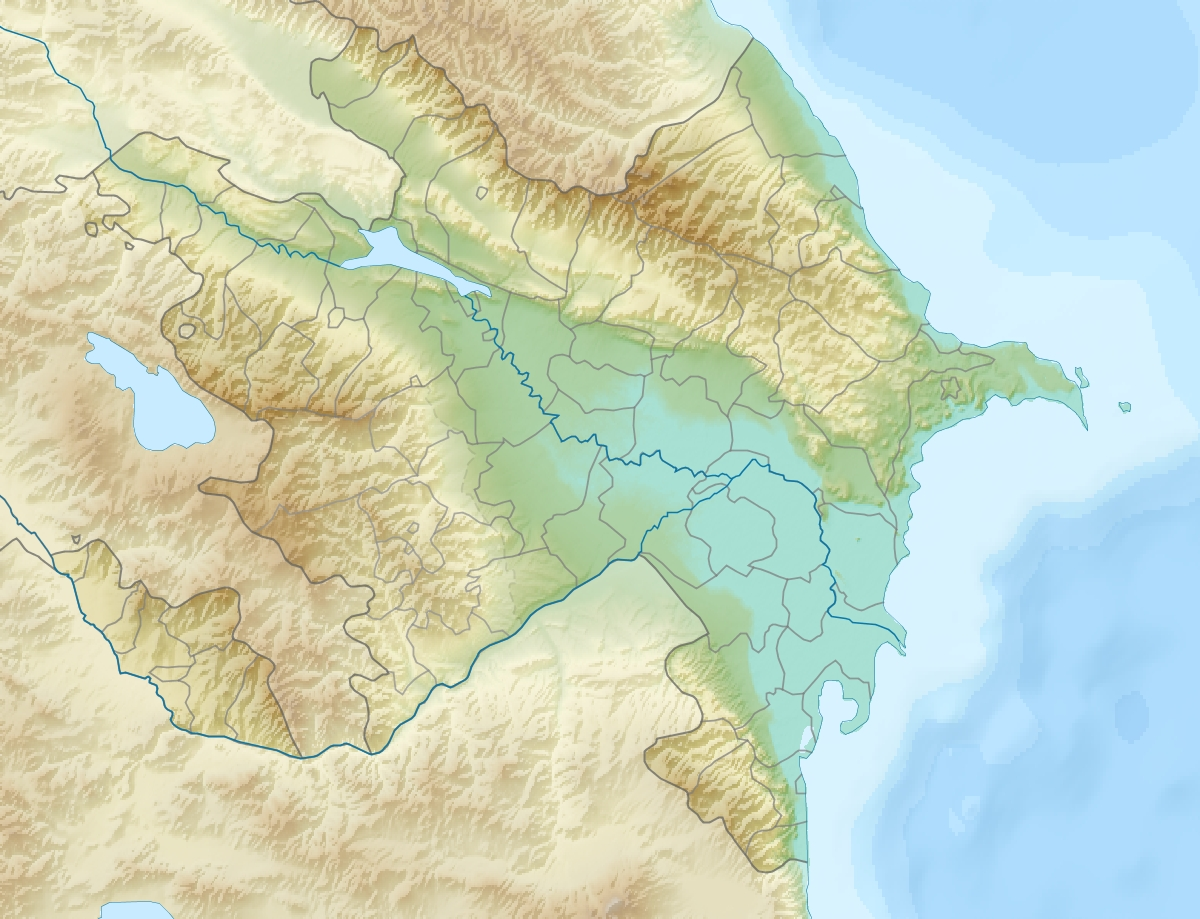
Khanates on a map of Azerbaijan and Armenia
- Quba: Quba Khanate, based inland, held much of the coast from Derbent to Baku. Its core was protected by rivers and forests and it exported food. Under Fatali Khan (1758–1789) it greatly expanded. It submitted to Zubov in 1796. About 1804, the Quba Khan broke an attempted siege of Baku. It submitted to Gazenap's successor in 1806 and was annexed along with Baku.
- Baku: Baku was practically a city-state, had the only good harbor on the west coast, and was the foremost commercial center in the western Caucasus. In 1723-1735, it was held by Russia. The Baku Khanate lasted from then until 1806. In 1768/1772, it was ruled by Quba. In 1796, it was taken by Zubov. In summer 1805 the Caspian Flotilla besieged Baku but was driven off by the Khan of Quba. Tsitsianov was killed here while accepting a feigned surrender. (Both times there was a mass exodus from the city because of what happened in Ganja.) Russian honor was retrieved by Gazenap and Baku and Quba surrendered to his successor Bulgakov, the khan having fled (September 1806).
- The Shirvan Khanate was based inland and held the land west of Baku and the coastline between Baku and Talysh. There had been an important state here since the ninth century. It and Shaki had Sunni khans and there was a religious conflict early in the century. Submitted in 1723. Controlled by Quba in 1768–1789. Submitted to Agha Mohammad in 1795. In 1796 Zubov seized the capital and the khan took shelter in a mountain stronghold. In late 1805 Tsitsianov made it a Russian vassal while marching east to Baku. Persia recognized Russian rule in 1813. Yermolov abolished it in August 1820, the khan fleeing to Persia.
- The Talysh Khanate (1747 to 1826) was on the lowland south of the Kura and Arax. In 1791, it was raided by Agha Mohammad who took booty and left. In 1809 Persia expelled the pro-Russian khan. Russia took its capital in 1813. By the Treaty of Gulistan (1813) Persia ceded everything north of Talysh. Its history from 1813 to 1826 is ill-documented. Russia kept part of its territory and the fortress of Lenkoran. The khanate existed but was hostile to Persia. It became a Russian province in 1826

== Black Sea coast ==
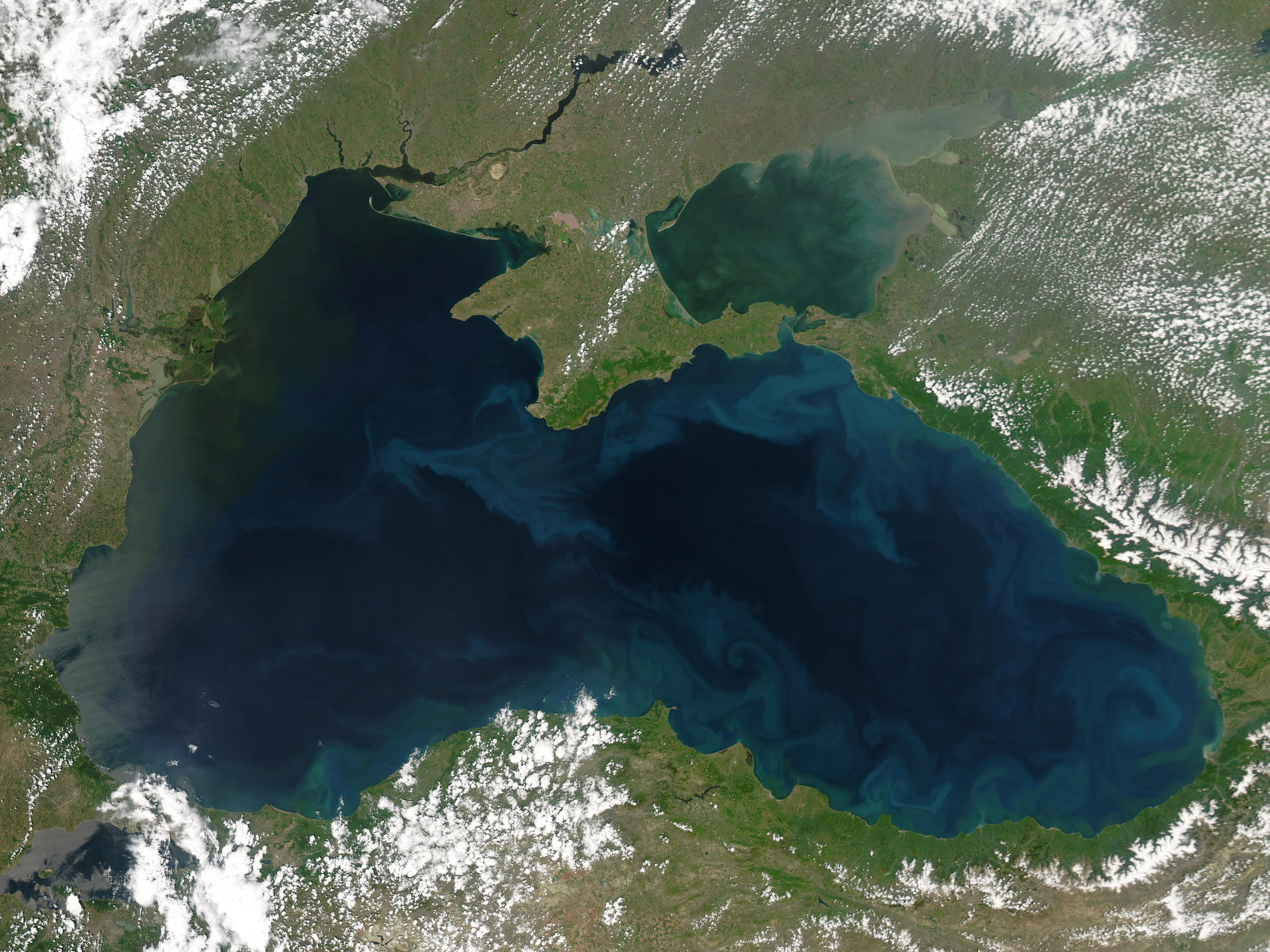
Black Sea from space showing the snow-covered western Caucasus

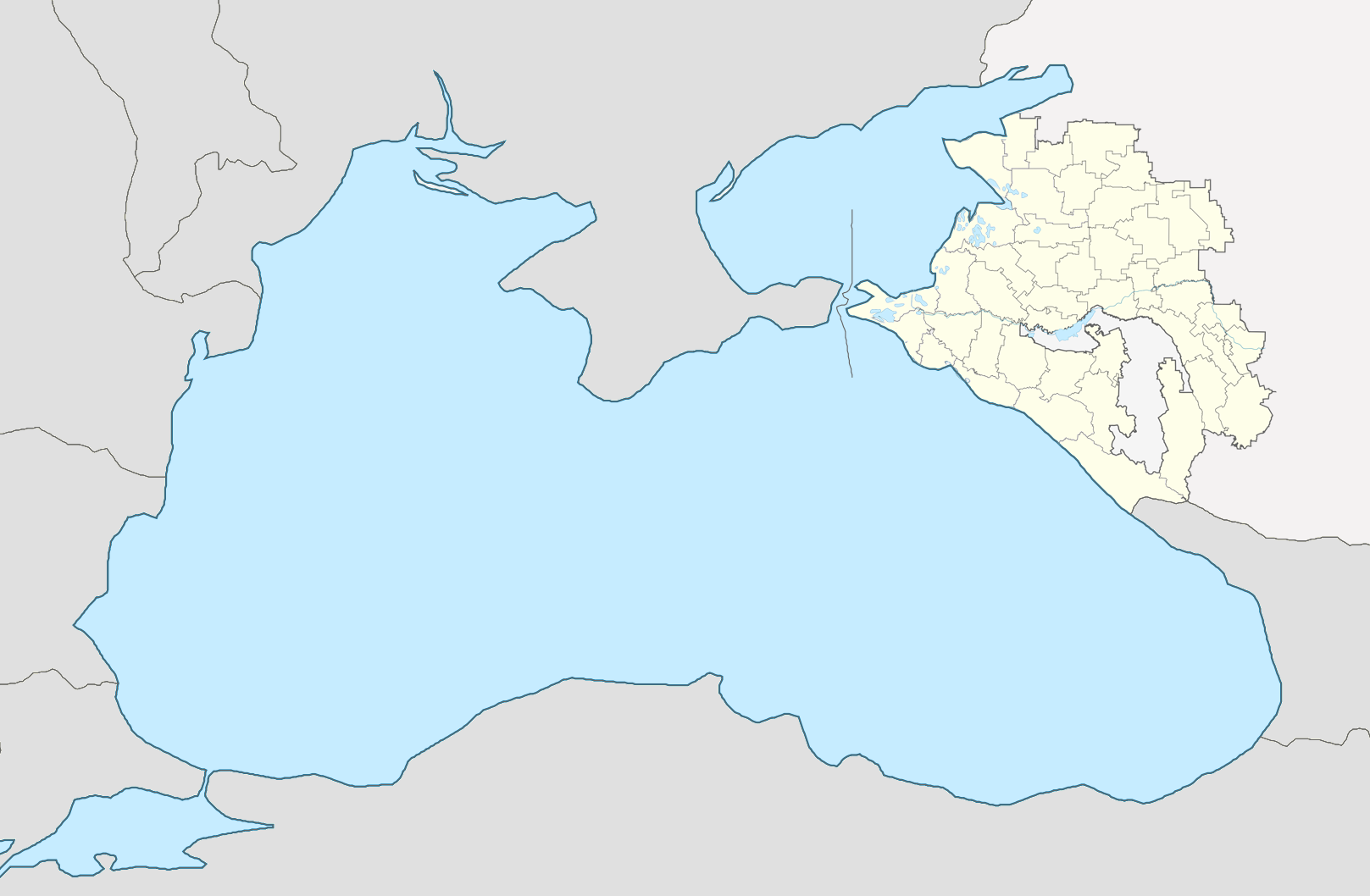
Krasnodar Krai and Georgia on the east coast of the Black Sea

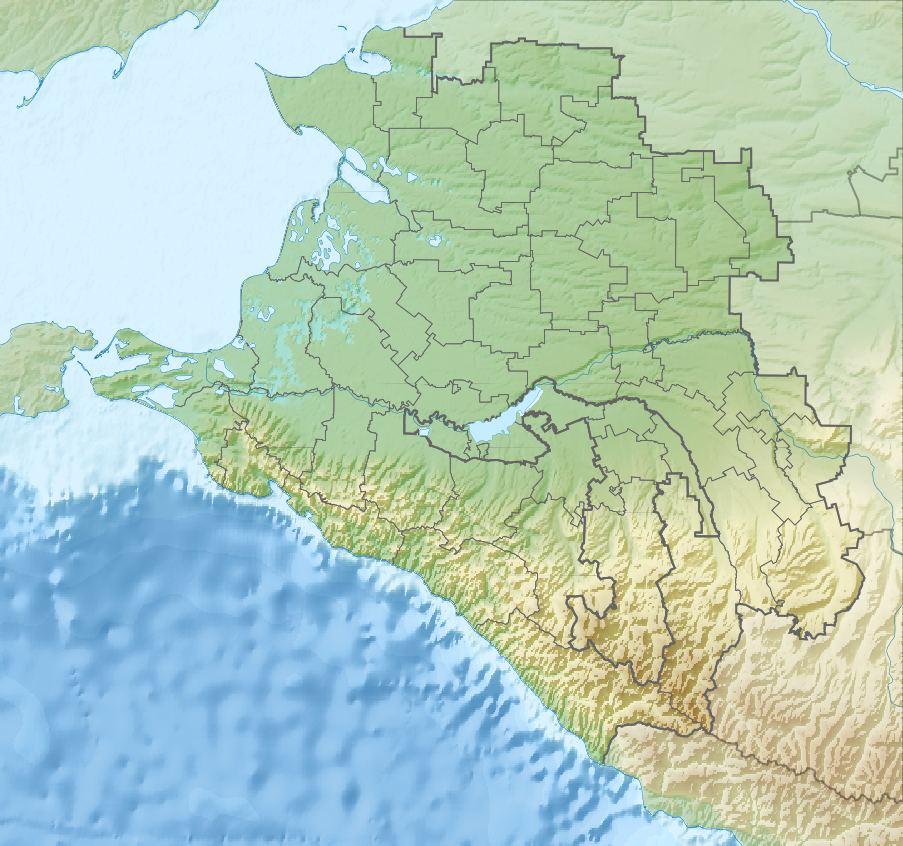
Krasnodar Krai: Northwest lowlands and Circassian coast.

Arrows=Kuban River and North Caucasus line of Cossack settlements
Georgia: Georgian coast
Ab= Abkhazia

The east coast of the Black Sea has four parts. In the far northwest around the Taman Peninsula the land was flat, connected to the steppes to the north and east, and inhabited by Circassians. Along most of the Circassian coast, the mountains came right down to the sea and the population was Circassian. Further south the coastal plain became wider and the population was Abkhazian – relatives of the Circassians under significant Georgian influence. In Georgia, the mountains and coast part company and agricultural land extends far into the interior. Where the coast swings westward the population becomes Muslim and Turkish.

The Georgian coast belongs to the history of Georgia while the Circassian coast was the southern flank of the Russo-Circassian War which Velyaminov described as a great siege. Our main concern is with the fortified ports along the coast. From these, the Ottomans could support the Circassians with guns and propaganda. Potentially they could have landed troops, but this only happened twice (Abkhazia in 1855 and 1877). The Russians needed to take the forts to tighten the ring around Circassia. The most important were Poti which led to Georgia and Anapa in the north which led to the steppes and the main body of Circassians. Any attack on the ports would be an act of war against the Ottoman Empire. Such a war would be fought mainly in the Balkan region. At war's end, the ports would be used as bargaining chips by diplomats dealing with far more important matters on the opposite side of the Black Sea.

=== History ===
The ancient Greeks founded colonies all around the Black Sea coast. These exported grain and slaves to Byzantium and beyond, a pattern that continued in various ways until the Russian conquest. Around 1700 the whole area was Turkish. Western Georgia was ruled by Turkish vassals. The Turks dominated the semi-independent Khanate of Crimea which in turn dominated the semi-independent steppe nomads to the north and east. Turkey also claimed a nominal sovereignty over the Circassian mountaineers.

In the Russo-Turkish War (1768–1774) Russia crossed the mountains for the first time and besieged Poti. The siege failed and the troops were withdrawn. At the end of the war, Crimea became independent of Turkey but in fact dependent on Russia, thereby blocking most Turkish access to the steppes. Russia also annexed Kerch on the west side of the Kerch Strait. In 1783, Russia annexed Crimea. During the Russo-Turkish War (1787–1792), it tried three times to take Anapa. The last attempt was successful, but Anapa was returned at the end of the war. In 1800, Russia annexed eastern Georgia. In 1803, Russia reached the Black Sea coast. In 1805, Anaklia was taken and then returned under diplomatic pressure. About the same time, they built Redut-Kale north of Turkish-held Poti. Abkhazia, or part of it, came under Russian control in 1810. During the Russo-Turkish War (1806–1812), Russia captured both Poti and Anapa but returned them at the end of the war. During the Russo-Turkish War (1828–1829), Anapa and Poti were captured and kept. By the Treaty of Adrianople (1829), Turkey gave up its claim to Circassia without ceding it to Russia. In the 1830s, there was a good bit of gun-running along the coast (Mission of the Vixen). In 1836-1844, the first Cossack settlements were built on the coast near Anapa. In 1837-1839, the Black Sea Coast Defensive Line was built along the coast from Taman to the south of Sukhum-Kale and later extended south to the Turkish border at Fort Saint Nicholas. A number of these places were destroyed by the Circassians in 1840 and restored in 1841. In 1854, during the Crimean War (1853-1856) the Coast Defensive Line was abandoned. In 1855 there was an Anglo-French attack on Novorossisk and a Turkish landing in Abkhazia. At the end of the Russo-Circassian War in 1864, several hundred thousand Circassians were expelled to the Ottoman Empire and their lands settled by Cossacks. Also in that year, the Principality of Abkhazia was formally abolished. The Russo-Turkish War (1877–78) included a Turkish landing near Abkhazia. At war's end Batum, Artvin, Ardahan, and Kars were annexed. Kars returned to Turkey after the Russian Revolution.

=== By place ===
- Kerch on the west side of the Kerch Strait was annexed in 1774.
- Taman to the east of the strait was annexed in 1783 along with Crimea.
- Anapa: When the Turks lost Crimea in 1783 they lost land contact with the Pontic steppe. Anapa suddenly became important since it was the best port to reach the Pontic steppes without crossing the mountains. French engineers converted it into a first-class fortress. During the Russo-Turkish War (1787–1792) Russia captured it on the third try and returned it at the end of the war. It surrendered to a naval squadron in 1807 and was returned at the end of the war. In 1828 it fell to a 36-day land and sea siege and remained Russian.
- Novorossisk is on a large bay. The Turks had a fort here called Sujuk-Qale and the Russians won a battle nearby around 1790. In 1838, the Russians built a port for the Black Sea Fleet and it remains a major port.
- Gelendzhik is on a smaller bay. The Turks had a fort here around 1770 and the Russians built one about 1831.
- Tuapse: Fort Velyaminovsky built here in 1838.
- Sochi Russian fort in 1838
- Gagra at the north end of Abkhazia only became important later.
- Sukhum-Kale (Sukhumi) joined Russia along with the rest of Abkhazia in 1810.
- Anaklia is near the south end of Abkhazia. The Russians took it in 1805 but withdrew under Turkish protest. Regained in 1810.
- Redut Kale (Redoubt Kali) was built by Tsitsianov around 1805 after he failed to obtain Poti.
- Poti is at the mouth to the Rioni River which drains most of western Georgia. It was unsuccessfully besieged by Todtleben in 1770 during the first Russian military action south of the mountains. It remained Turkish after Russia took Mingrelia in 1803. Tsitsianov tried to negotiate its transfer about 1805. An attempt to take it in 1807 failed. Prince Orbeliani took it in 1809. Returned at end of the war. In 1828 it was captured and kept.
  - On the coast south of Poti was Limani, where a Turkish fortified camp was defeated in 1829.
- Fort Saint Nicholas at the mouth of the Choloki River was on the Turkish frontier until the capture of Batum.
- Batum and the province of Adjaria had a significant Muslim population and was annexed in 1878. By 1900, it was the terminus of a railroad to Baku and was an important oil port.
- Kars, Erzurum, Trabzond, and the surrounding area remained Turkish. In each of the wars, the Russians pushed into this area and withdrew when peace was made, sometimes keeping a few border forts. The only exception was Kars province which was held from 1878 to 1921.

== Mountains ==
By 1813, Russia held the lowlands south of the mountains. They had no difficulty with the lowlands north of the mountains. To connect them they held the Georgian Military Highway in the center which was the only good route across the mountains except for the Caspian coast. They now had to gain control of the intervening mountains, which was by far the longest, bloodiest, and most difficult part of the conquest of the Caucasus. In the east, the tribes formed a military-theocratic state and held out until 1859. See Murid War. In the west, the mountaineers had no formal organization but held out until 1864. In 1862-1864 several hundred thousand people were driven from their homes in the western mountains and exiled to the Ottoman Empire. See Russo-Circassian War.

== North of the mountains ==
In the 19th century, the steppe nomads north of the Caucasus were gradually replaced by Russian colonists. At the same time and a little before the North Caucasus Line was formed along the north side of the mountains. This was used as a base to attack the mountaineers and was a center from which the Russian population expanded. For the general area see Black Sea-Caspian Steppe.

=== Steppe ===
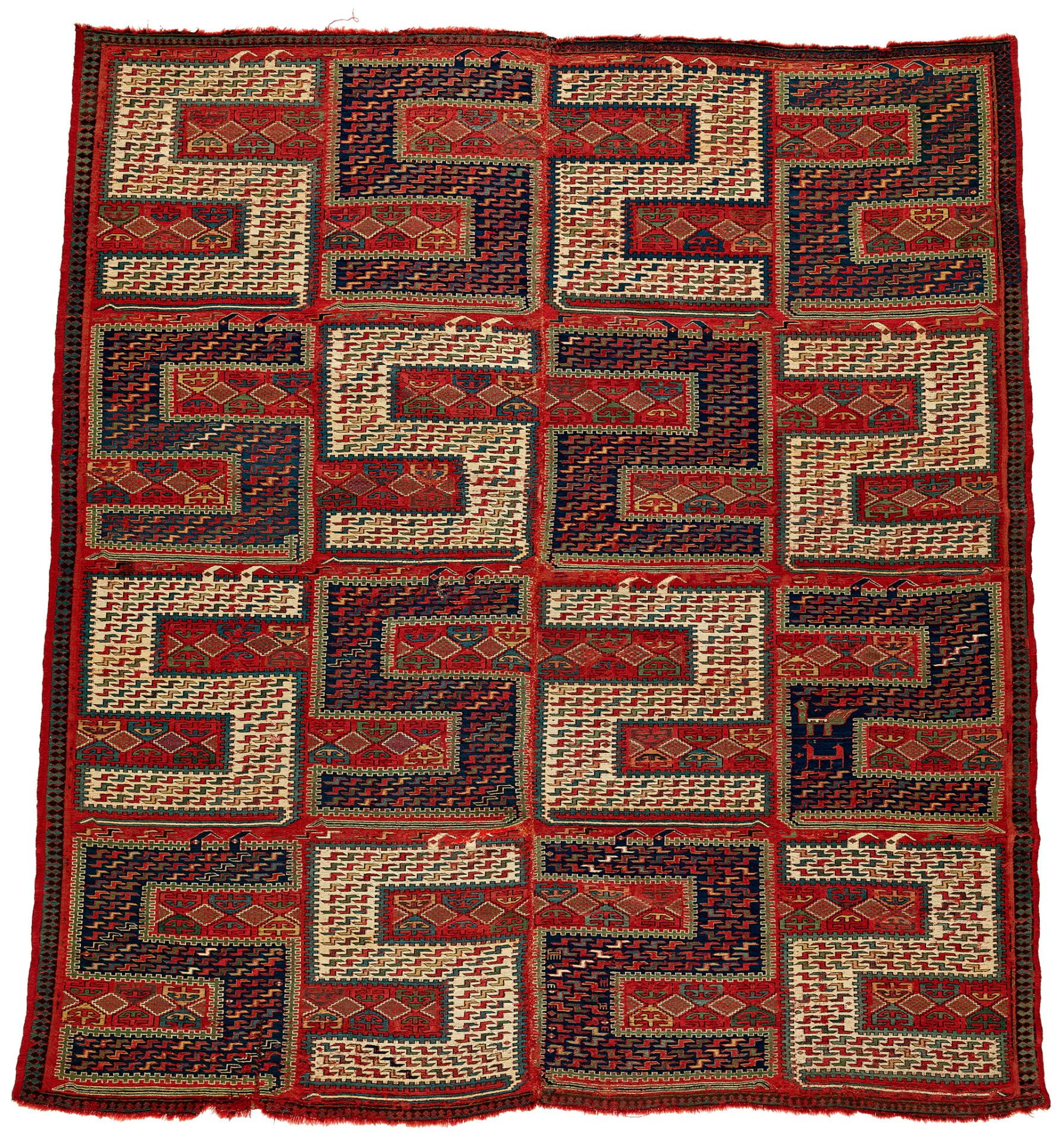
"Dragon" flatweave rug, Caucasus, 1875-1925. Made by resettled nomadic peoples after the Russian conquest.

When the Golden Horde broke up about 1500 the steppe nomads came to be called the Nogai Horde. They were to some degree subjects of the Crimean Khanate which was, in turn, a semi-independent vassal of the Ottoman Empire. In 1557, the Nogais east of Azov broke off and formed the Lesser Nogai Horde, a name that gradually went out of use. Around 1630, the Kalmyks migrated west from Dzungaria and occupied the land around the north end of the Caspian Sea, driving the Nogais south and west. In 1771, a significant part of them returned to Dzungaria and the Nogais expanded east and north. In 1777, Alexander Suvorov was appointed to the western or Kuban half of the Line, Jakobi taking the east half. In 1783, Russia annexed Crimea and thereby took over the Crimeans' claim to rule the Nogais.

According to Baddeley, one of the Potemkins formed a plan to move the Nogais east of the Volga. Suvarov called a great meeting at Yeysk on the Sea of Azov and announced that sovereignty over the Nogais had been transferred from the Crimean Khan to the Russian Czar. The Nogais seemed to accept this, but they soon learned of the resettlement plan and fighting broke out. When they attacked the Russian detachment they were slaughtered. Later other groups of Nogais were defeated. For a more modern version see Kuban Nogai Uprising.

Tsutsiev's atlas for 1829-1839 shows a group of Nogai south of the great bend of the Kuban which soon disappeared, another group north of Pyatigorsk and another group ("Karanogai") south of the Kuma River. By 1886-1890, there were two small groups on the upper Kuban north of Cherkessk (one of these became the Nogaysky District, Karachay-Cherkess Republic in 2007), three small areas northwest of Pyatigorsk and the large area south of the Kuma. Today the Nogais have the Nogaysky District, Republic of Dagestan south of the Kuma River in the far southeast. According to the 2010 census, there were 103,660 Nogais in the Russian Federation, 29,556 in the Dagestan raion, and 11,851 in the Karachay raion.

== Impact on Russian literature and politics ==
The acquisition of new peoples had an invigorating effect on the rest of Russia. According to two Russian historians:

the culture of Russia and that of the Caucasian peoples interacted in a reciprocally beneficial manner. The turbulent tenor of life in the Caucasus, the mountain peoples' love of freedom, and their willingness to die for independence were felt far beyond the local interaction of the Caucasian peoples and coresident Russians: they injected a potent new spirit into the thinking and creative work of Russia's progressives, strengthened the liberationist aspirations of Russian writers and exiled Decembrists, and influenced distinguished Russian democrats, poets, and prose writers, including Alexander Griboyedov, Alexander Pushkin, Mikhail Lermontov, and Leo Tolstoy. These writers, who generally supported the Caucasian fight for liberation, went beyond the chauvinism of the colonial autocracy and rendered the Caucasian peoples' cultures accessible to the Russian intelligentsia. At the same time, Russian culture exerted an influence on Caucasian cultures, bolstering positive aspects while weakening the impact of the Caucasian peoples' reactionary feudalism and reducing the internecine fighting between tribes and clans.

The Russian takeover contributed to the rise of a body in Russian literature surrounding Caucasian narratives, known as the "Literary Caucasus." This period was markedly noted for shaping Russian perceptions of the Caucasus, and for having including overtones of national identity and empire, appealing largely to nineteenth-century Russian elites. One of the most famous Russian writers focusing on the Caucasus was Alexander Pushkin, whose then-groundbreaking writings on the Caucasus helped shape views of the region for landed Russians.

According to Professor Ronald Grigor Suny:

"Pushkin's evocative poem, "The Prisoner of the Caucasus," was at one and the same time travelogue, ethnography, geography, and even war correspondence. In Pushkin's imaginative geography, the communion with nature "averted the eye from military conquest" and largely disregarded the native peoples of the Caucasus, who represented a vague menace to the Russian's lyrical relationship with the wilderness. His epilogue to the poem celebrated the military conquest of the Caucasus and introduced a dissonant note into his celebration of the purity, generosity, and liberty of the mountaineers."

Some famous works of the Literary Caucasus include:

- The Prisoner of the Caucasus, Alexander Pushkin, 1820–1822
- A Journey to Arzrum, Alexander Pushkin, 1835–1836
- A Hero of Our Time, Mikhail Lermontov, 1839–1841
- The Cossacks, Leo Tolstoy, 1863
- The Prisoner of the Caucasus, Leo Tolstoy, 1872
- Hadji Murat, Leo Tolstoy, 1912

== See also ==
- Circassian genocide
- Russian–Kumyk Wars
- Eastern question
- Great Game
- Treaty of Turkmenchay
