= Pyotr Zakharov-Chechenets =

Russian painter

- Пётр Захаров-Чеченец
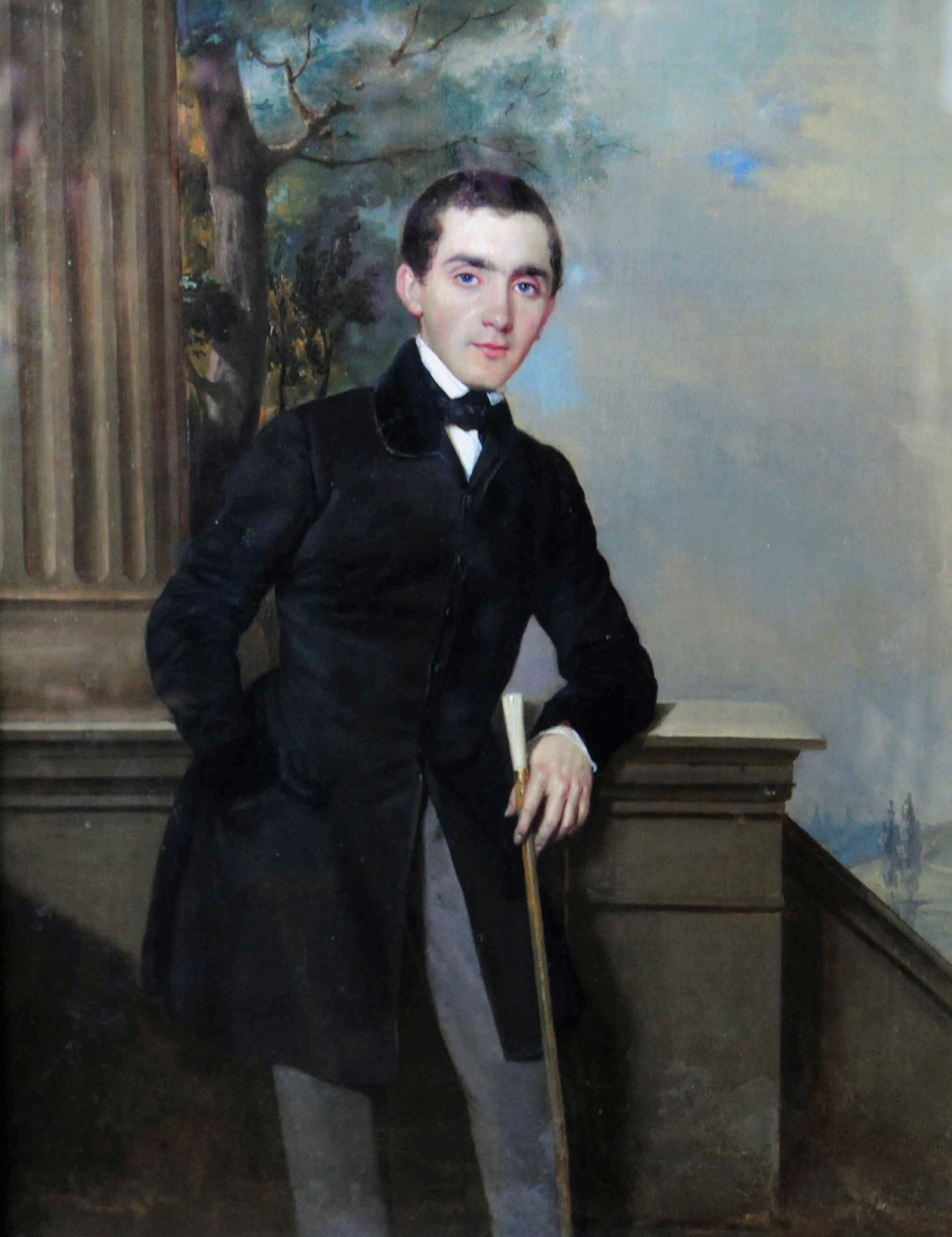
- Self-Portrait, 1834, oil on canvas; Picture Gallery, Tambov
- Born: 1816; Dadi-Yurt
- Died: 1846 (aged 29–30); Moscow
- Resting place: Vagankovo Cemetery, Moscow
- Known for: portrait paintings

Pyotr Zakharovich Zakharov-Chechenets (Russian: Пётр Захарович Захаров-Чеченец; 1816 – 1846) was a Russian painter of Chechen origin, best known for his portraits, typical of Romantic style. He is generally remembered as the first professional painter of Chechen origin.

== Biography ==
In 1819, during the Caucasian War, Russian troops razed to the ground the Chechen aul Dadi-Yurt. Commonly, men were killed but the surviving women and children taken captive. One of them was a three-year-old boy. The commander-in-chief of the Russian army Aleksey Petrovich Yermolov had the child given for nursing to Cossack Zakhar Nedonosov. From the name of this Cossack, the child got his surname and patronymic. Later Pyotr appended the word Chechenets to his surname in order to show his ethnic identity.

At the age of seven, Pyotr was adopted by Major-General Pyotr Yermolov, Commander of a Georgian Grenadier regiment and a cousin of Aleksey Petrovich Yermolov. Pyotr Yermolov liked Zakharov very much and, despite having seven children of his own, treated him as his own son.

The boy showed talent in painting and Pyotr Yermolov tried to send him to the Imperial Academy of Arts in Saint Petersburg but the president of the academy, Aleksey Olenin, claimed that the 10-year-old boy was too young to study at the academy and recommended hiring a private teacher. So, the boy got lessons from the portraitist Lev Volkov.

Eventually, at the age of 17, Zakharov entered the academy. He graduated in 1835 with a diploma of Free Artist and was recommended for a scholarship to study art in Italy. The trip might have been helpful for both his artistic growth and for his health, which had begun to show signs of tuberculosis. However, his name was withdrawn from the list for the scholarship by Emperor Nicholas I of Russia who insisted that national minorities (inorodtsy) should not benefit from the academy's scholarships. Another misfortune followed as Zakarov's first teacher, Lev Volkov, refused to allow his daughter to marry Zakharov despite the young people being in love. Instead Volkov had her sent to relatives in the Caucasus with an order to marry her off to any first-comer just to stop the affair.

Zakharov soon became a fashionable portraitist. His clients included the favorite daughter of Nicholas I, Grand Duchess Maria Nikolayevna and her future husband Maximilian, Duke of Leuchtenberg. In 1837, he was admitted to the state service as an Artist in the Military Department. In 1842, his Portrait of Aleksey Petrovich Yermolov qualified him to become an Imperial Academician.

On 14 January 1846, Zakharov married, but their happiness was short. On 13 June 1846, his wife died from tuberculosis. Zakharov died from the same disease a few months later.

Many works of Zakharov-Chechenets are kept in the Tretyakov Gallery and in the Russian Museum. The Art Museum in the capital of Chechnya, Grozny also used to have many of his works including his Self-Portrait, and Portrait of I.F. Ladygensky. In 1995 during the First Chechen War the Grozny Museum was heavily damaged and the paintings were all but destroyed. Since 1995, they are being restored at the Grabar Restoration Center in Moscow.

== Works ==
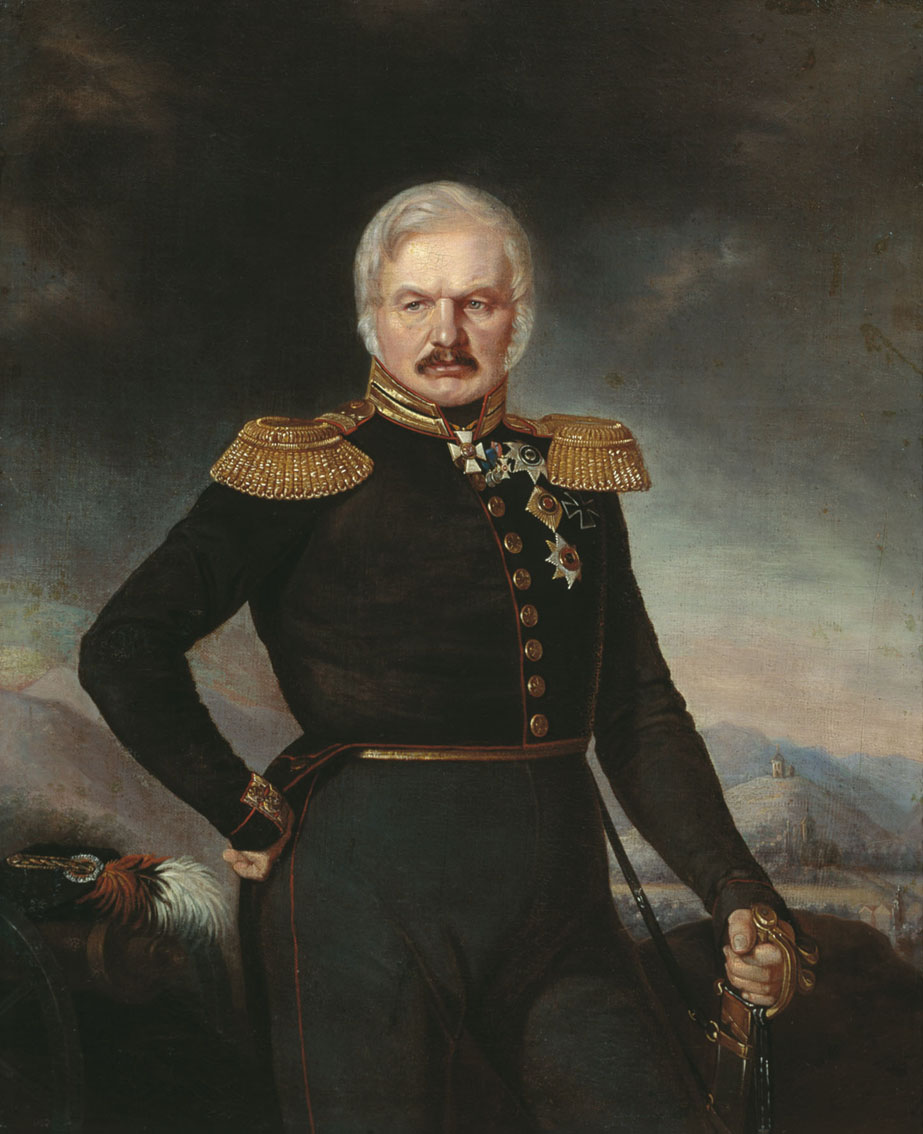
Portrait of Aleksey Petrovich Yermolov, 1842

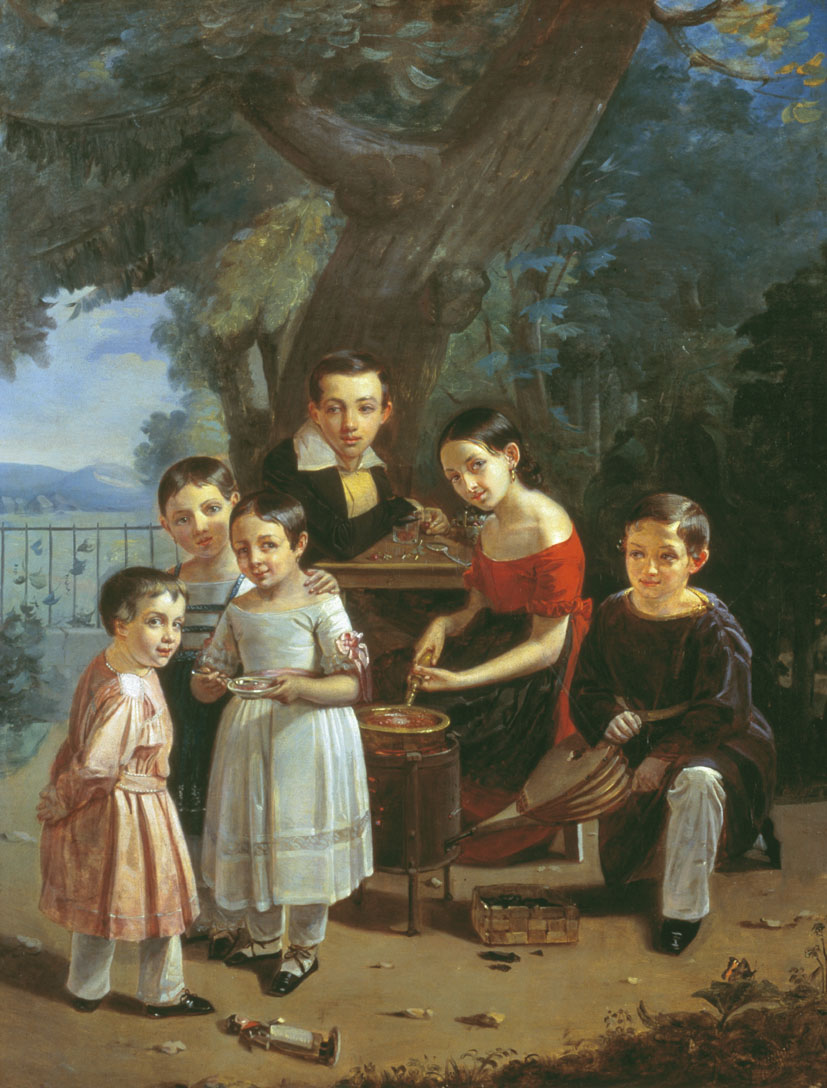
Children of Pyotr Yermolov, 1839

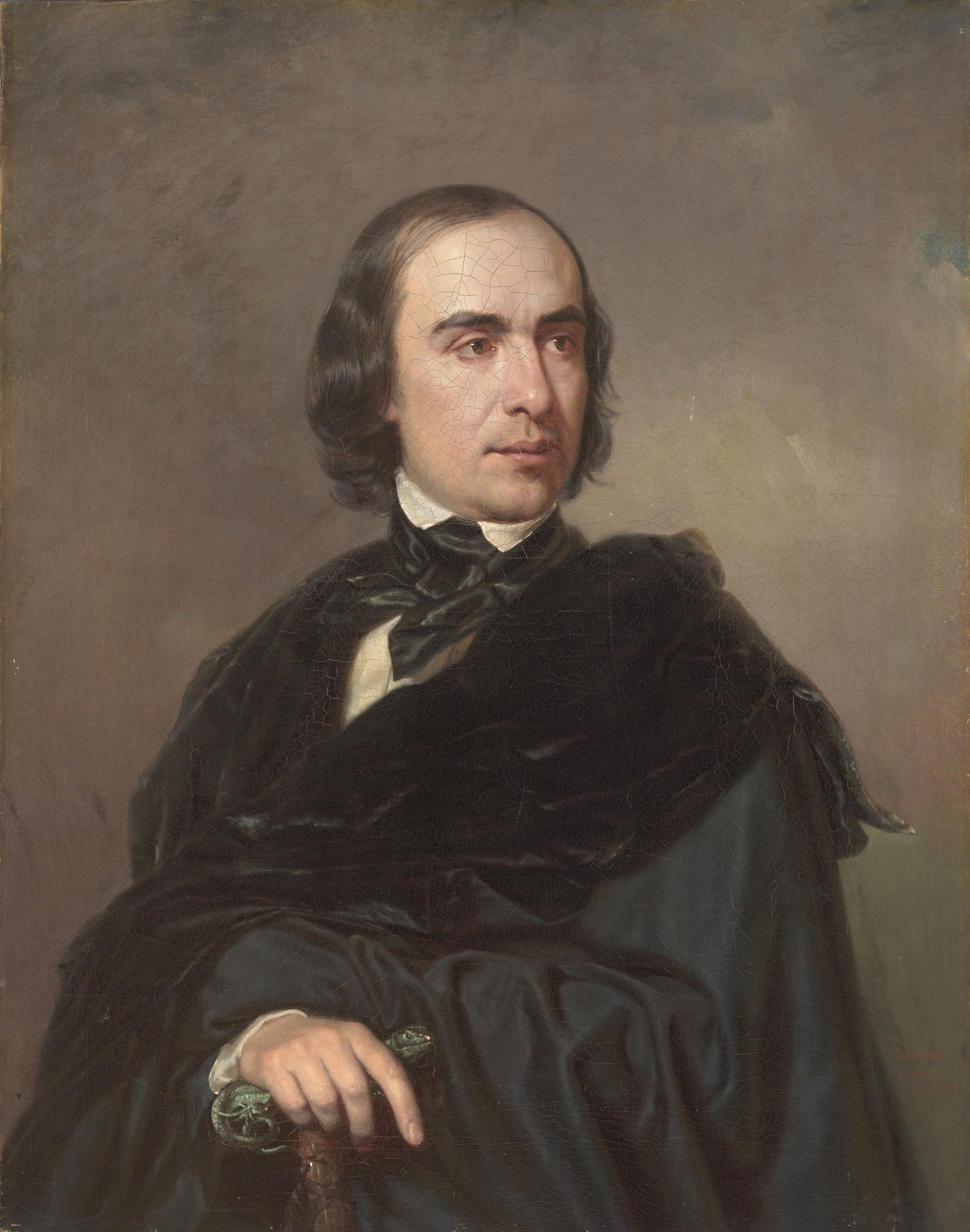
Portrait of historian Timofey Granovsky, 1845

== Memory ==
- Pyotr Zakharov is depicted on the sketch of Michael Scotty "The Armenian Nerses and the Chechen Zakharov" (1836).
- Zakharov is depicted in the painting by landscape painter Grigory Chernetsov "Parade on October 6, 1831 in St. Petersburg." The list of persons who were to be depicted in the picture was approved personally by Emperor Nicholas I. In the subsequently published list of characters from among the spectators, Zakharov appeared under the number 204.
- A fictional pastoral painting titled Empty Pasture in Afternoon accredited to Zakharov features prominently in Anthony Marra's book The Tsar of Love and Techno: Stories.
- Before the First Chechen War in Grozny worked the Chechen-Ingush Republican Museum of Fine Arts named after Pyotr Zakharov.
- In 2016 the name of Pyotr Zakharov was awarded to the Grozny children's art school No. 2.
- October 5, 2017 in Grozny opened a park named after Pyotr Zakharov.

== See also ==
- List of Russian artists
