= Tazit =

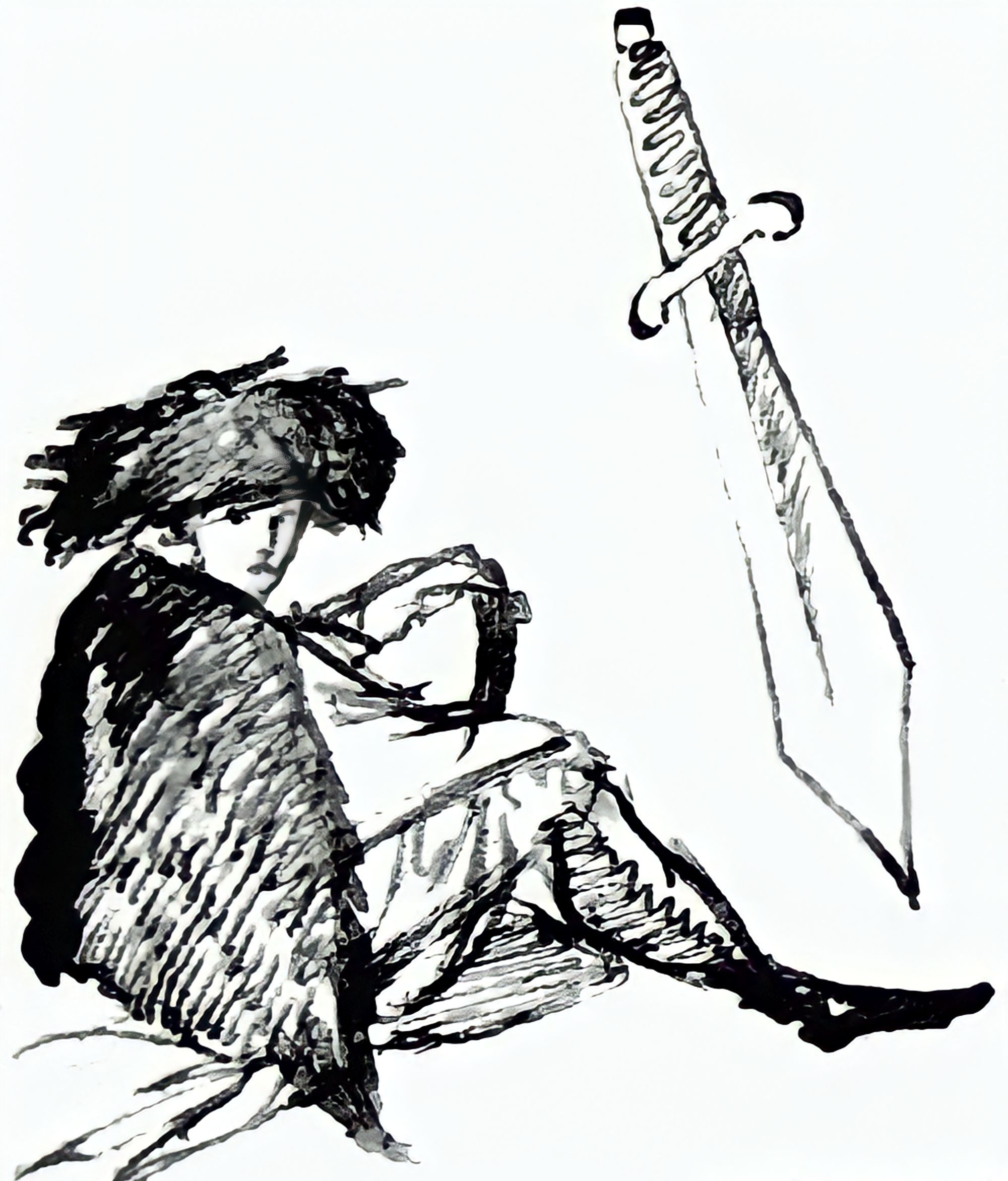
An illustration for the poem sketched by Pushkin

Tazit (Russian: Тазит) is an unfinished Russian narrative poem by Alexander Pushkin, composed in late 1829 and early 1830 and first published in 1837, after Pushkin's death. One of several works by Pushkin set in the Caucasus, its eponymous hero is a young Circassian man who is renounced by his father for refusing to avenge his brother. The poem ends with the exiled Tazit asking his beloved's father for his daughter's hand in marriage. Some more verses for the poem found in Pushkin's manuscript draft describe Tazit's rejection by his beloved's father and his subsequent loneliness. Pushkin also wrote outlines for the further development of the story which suggest that Tazit meets a missionary, possibly converting to Christianity, then dies during a war between the Circassians and Russians. The story of the poem may have been inspired by a secondary plotline in the Walter Scott novel The Fair Maid of Perth.

== Synopsis ==
The poem opens with the Circassians (Note: Mainly called adekhi in the poem) mourning the murdered son of an old man, Gasub. After the burial, Gasub's other son, Tazit, returns to the village after being raised by a Chechen outsider since infancy. Tazit feels out of place in his native village and spends most of his time wandering in the wilderness and listening to the sounds of nature. Gasub is unhappy with his son, whom he expected to have been raised as a brave and clever warrior. He twice scolds his son, first for not attacking an Armenian merchant on the road, then for not catching an escaped slave. After the second scolding, Tazit leaves the village and returns after three days. He reveals to his father that he encountered the murderer of his brother, but did not kill him because he was wounded and defenseless. Enraged, Gasub calls Tazit a coward for refusing to avenge his brother. He renounces Tazit and tells him to leave. Gasub falls asleep, then wakes in the night and calls for Tazit but receives no answer. In another village, Tazit falls in love with a local girl whom he saw in the mountains. Sometime later, he asks her father for her hand in marriage. (The first published version of the poem ends here.)

Some more verses for the poem found in Pushkin's manuscript draft describe Tazit's rejection by his beloved's father and his subsequent loneliness. Pushkin also wrote outlines for the further development of the story which suggest that Tazit meets a missionary, possibly converting to Christianity, (Note: Mark Altshuller writes that "it does not necessarily follow from Puškin's outline that Tazit was a Christian. This assumption has always confused commentators and has led to tenuous interpretations.") then dies during a war between the Circassians and Russians. It is not clear on whose side Tazit fights, nor is it clear whether he reconciles with his father in the end or not.

== Composition and publication history ==
Pushkin composed the poem in late 1829 and early 1830. He had traveled to the Caucasus in the summer of 1829; the journey served as the basis for his travel account A Journey to Arzrum. An Ossetian funeral which Pushkin witnessed and described in A Journey to Arzrum served as the inspiration for the funeral described at the beginning of the poem. Excerpts of the poem were first published by Vasily Zhukovsky in the journal Sovremennik in 1837, after Pushkin's death. Pushkin had left the poem untitled, so Zhukovsky published it under the title Galub, apparently a misreading of the name of the character Gasub. Later publications have not used this title, preferring to call the poem by the name of its protagonist, Tazit. Pavel Annenkov published the manuscript outlines of the poem in 1855.

== Reception, sources and analysis ==
In the first half of the nineteenth century, literary critic Vissarion Belinsky wrote about the poem in his work Literaturnaya khronika (1838) and elsewhere, praising its "profound humane conception" and noting its significant difference from Pushkin's other narrative poem set in the Caucasus, The Prisoner of the Caucasus (1820). Belinsky considered Tazit to be one of Pushkin's best works. Annenkov, who published Pushkin's manuscript materials on Tazit in 1855, identified the poem's central theme as the conflict between Christian humaneness, represented by Tazit, and the barbarity of the natives of the Caucasus. In A Journey to Arzrum, Pushkin noted the destruction wrought upon the Circassians by the Russian Empire and expressed hope that reconciliation could be achieved through increasing economic ties and the spread of Christianity, which would replace the "bloody customs" of the Caucasians.

Little attention was given to Tazit until the twentieth century. A number of scholars have attempted to determine the literary sources of the poem. In his study of the poem, Vasily Komarovich connected the poem with the work of François-René de Chateaubriand and related literary traditions. This view has been rejected by other scholars. Dmitry Yakubovich first suggested that Tazit was inspired by the work of Walter Scott. Following this hypothesis, Mark Altshuller concluded that the story of Tazit was inspired by a secondary plotline in Scott's 1828 novel The Fair Maid of Perth. (Note: The novel, which was one of Scott's most acclaimed works, was published in 1828, translated into French the same year, and translated from French into Russian in 1829. Pushkin was already reading in English at this time, so he could have read any one of these versions of the book.) In this plotline, Conachar, the son of a Scottish chieftain, grows up in the city away from his clan and is imbued with Christian values by a monk. When he returns home and becomes chieftain, he is overwhelmed by the barbarity of war and commits suicide. Altshuller suggests that Pushkin planned for Tazit's story to end in an analogous manner: refusing to kill in the war between the Russians and the Circassians, he would flee and die off the battlefield, perhaps driven to suicide by guilt. This focus on the theme of cowardice may have had an autobiographical element. In 1825, Pushkin considered joining the Decembrist revolt out of loyalty to his friends. He may have been drawn to the story of Conachar in Scott's novel while contemplating his own actions and those of the participants during the revolt.

Tazit has been contrasted with Pushkin's previous narrative poems, namely The Prisoner of the Caucasus and The Gypsies (1824). Both The Gypsies and Tazit deal with the issue of the individual's relationship with society and the times. While Aleko in The Gypsies is incapable of going against the established moral code of his group, Tazit rejects his culture's norms in favor of a universal and Christian morality. According to Altshuller, in the later "little tragedies" and The Belkin Tales, Pushkin depicts yet another conception of the individual: "one independent of history and society." In Dmitry Blagoy's view, the differences between The Prisoner of the Caucasus and Tazit highlight Pushkin's shift from being a romantic poet to becoming a "mature realist artist." Blagoy writes that, while in The Prisoner of the Caucasus the realities of Caucasian life serve merely as a romantic background to the plot, Tazit is totally rooted in the realities of the Caucasus and its current problems; thus, he calls Tazit a "Caucasian poem, in the most precise and complete sense of the word." Regarding the style of the poem, Blagoy states that there is a strong presence of elements of folk poetry throughout the entire work; for example, the opening of the work with a repeated negative construction is characteristic of folk poetry. According to Blagoy, this feature sets the poem apart from Pushkin's other works and demonstrate the author's desire to produce increasingly "national" work (previously most visible in the poem Poltava). Komarovich also saw the folk elements in the poem, but, based on a comparison of the earlier and later drafts of the poem, concluded that the folkloric and ethnographic elements diminished in favor of other stylistic elements as Pushkin revised the text.

Scholars have also examined the question of why Pushkin left the poem unfinished. Altshuller writes that it may have been the result of Pushkin changing his views on the relationship between the individual and the community. G. F. Turchaninov, who shared Annenkov's view that the poem is about Christianity, writes that Pushkin abandoned the poem because he realized that its planned tragic ending would contradict his real-life proposal, expressed in Journey to Arzrum, to spread Christianity to "civilize" the mountaineers; that is, it would appear to prove that Christian values cannot take root in Caucasian society.

== Poetic structure ==
The poem is written in rhymed iambic tetrameter (i.e., each line consists of four iambic feet). For example, the first two lines:

 ×   /  × /  ×  / × /(×)
Не для бесед и ликований
 ×   /   × / ×   / × /(×)
Не для кровавых совещаний[d]

Some of the rhymes, like the one above, are feminine rhymes (the rhymed, stressed syllable is followed by an unstressed syllable), while others are masculine.

An earlier, different version of the first several lines found in Pushkin's drafts is written in trochaic tetrameter.
