= The Prisoner of the Caucasus (poem) =

1822 poem by Alexander Pushkin

- Author: Alexander Pushkin
- Original title: Кавказскій плѣнникъ
- Translator: Roger Clarke
- Language: Russian
- Genre: Narrative poem
- Publication date: 1822
- Publication place: Russian Empire
- Media type: Print

The Prisoner of the Caucasus (Russian: Кавка́зский пле́нник Kavkázskiy plénnik), (Note: Written Кавказскій плѣнникъ in pre-reform Russian orthography) also translated as Captive of the Caucasus, is a narrative poem written by Alexander Pushkin in 1820–21 and published in 1822. Dedicated to his friend Nikolay Raevsky, (Note: Son and namesake of the general.) it was inspired by the poet's time spent in Pyatigorsk during his southern exile.

The poem is about a Byronic Russian officer who is disillusioned with elite life and decides to escape by seeking adventure in the Caucasus. He is captured by Circassian tribesmen but then saved by a beautiful Circassian woman. Despite its Romantic and Orientalist themes, Pushkin's use of academic footnotes and reliable ethnographic material gave it credibility in its day. It was highly influential on popular perceptions of the Caucasus in its time. The poem remains one of Pushkin's most famous works and is often referenced in Russian popular culture, for example, in the title of the Soviet comedy Kidnapping, Caucasian Style, which is titled Kavkazskaya plennitsa (The female prisoner of the Caucasus) in Russian.

== English translations ==
- Roger Clarke, as "A Prisoner in the Caucasus" in Eugene Onegin & Other Stories, London: Wordsworth Editions, 2005, ISBN 978-1840221367.

== See also ==
- Russian conquest of the Caucasus
- The Prisoner of the Caucasus, a short story by Leo Tolstoy
- A Journey to Arzrum, a later work by Pushkin on the Caucasus
- Tazit, an unfinished narrative poem by Pushkin on a Caucasian theme
