= A Journey to Arzrum =

A Journey to Arzrum during the Campaign of 1829
- Author: Alexander Pushkin
- Original title: Путешествие в Арзрум во время похода 1829 года
- Translator: Birgitta Ingemanson
- Language: Russian, with some French
- Genre: Travel literature
- Publisher: Saint Petersburg: Sovremennik (Russian 1st ed.); Ann Arbor: Ardis (English 1st ed.)
- Publication date: 1836
- Publication place: Russian Empire
- English publication date: 1974
- Media type: Print

A Journey to Arzrum (Russian: Путешествие в Арзрум, romanized: Puteshestviye v Arzrum) (Note: Full title: A Journey to Arzrum during the Campaign of 1829, Путешествие в Арзрум во время похода 1829 года) is a work of travel literature by Alexander Pushkin. It was originally written by Pushkin in 1829, partially published in 1830, reworked in 1835, and then fully published in Pushkin's journal Sovremennik in 1836.

The work recounts the poet's travels to the Caucasus, Armenia, and Arzrum (modern Erzurum) in eastern Turkey at the time of the Russo-Turkish War (1828–29). The Tsarist authorities never allowed Pushkin to travel abroad and he had only been permitted to travel as far as Tiflis (Tbilisi), capital of Georgia and Russian Transcaucasia. His unauthorized journey across the border into Turkey infuriated Tsar Nicholas I, who "threatened to confine Pushkin to his estate once again."

Pushkin's text challenged, though did not entirely reject, the Orientalist romanticism of his earlier Prisoner of the Caucasus. As a result, it was not popularly received by contemporary readers who expected a romantic epic poem about the Caucasus.

A Journey to Arzrum was later adapted into a film during the Soviet era. Produced by Lenfilm and released on the 100th anniversary of Pushkin's passing in 1937, it was directed by Moisei Levin and starred Dmitri Zhuravlyov as Pushkin.

== English translations ==
- Birgitta Ingemanson, A Journey to Arzrum. Ann Arbor: Ardis. 1974. ISBN 978-0882330679.
- Ronald Wilks in Tales of Belkin and Other Prose Writings. New York: Penguin Classics. 1998. ISBN 978-0140446753.
- Nicholas Pasternak Slater in Lermontov, Mikhail (2013). A Hero of Our Time. Oxford: Oxford University Press. ISBN 978-0199652686.
- Richard Pevear and Larissa Volokhonsky in Novels, Tales, Journeys: The Complete Prose of Alexander Pushkin. New York: Alfred A. Knopf. 2016. ISBN 978-0307959621.
- Derek Davis in Journal of the Royal Asiatic Society. Cambridge: Royal Asiatic Society. 2022. ISSN 1356-1863.

== See also ==
- Armenian Oblast
- Russian conquest of the Caucasus
