= Aleksey Yermolov =

Russian general (1777–1861)

- Алексей Петрович Ермолов
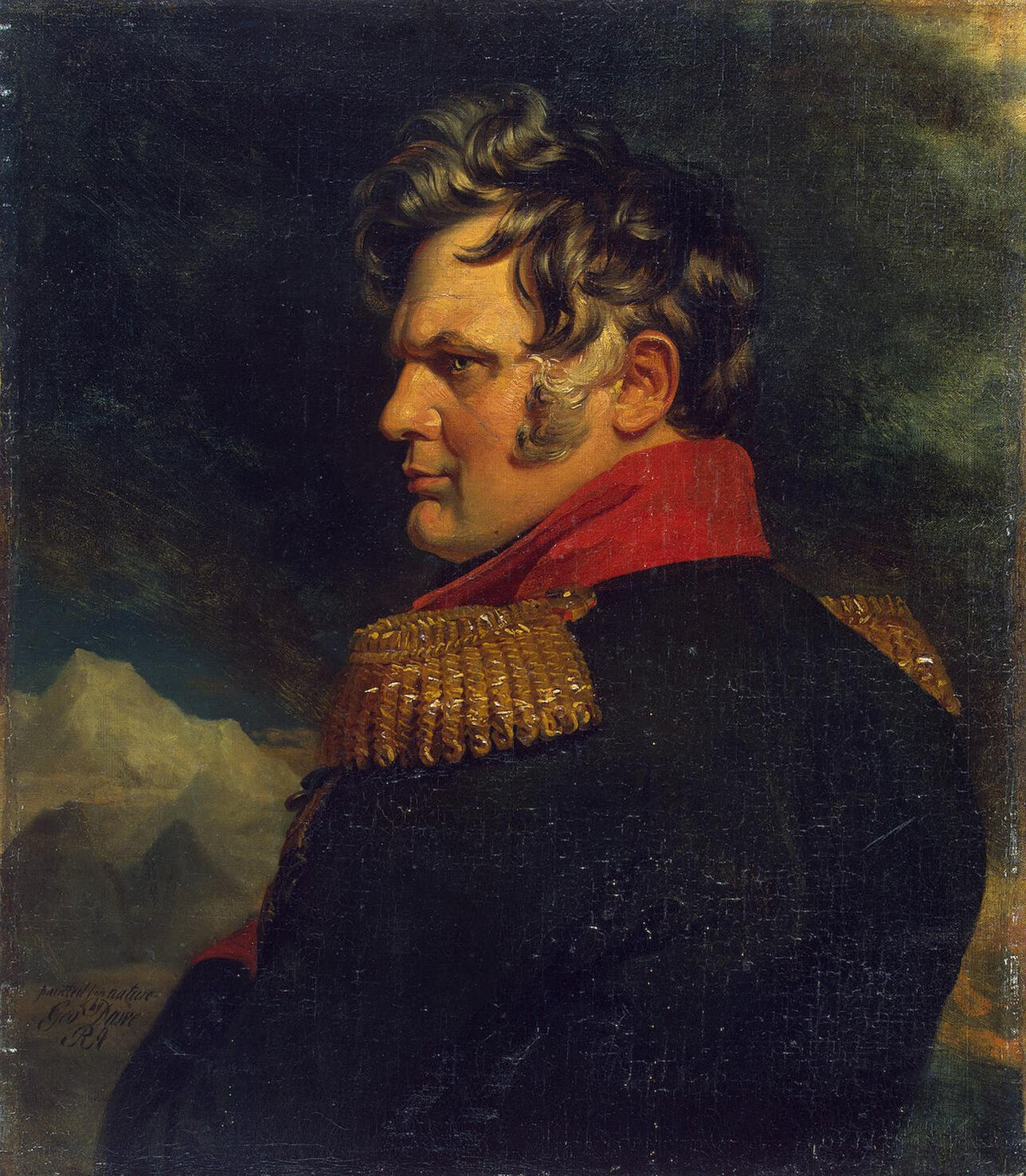
- Portrait by George Dawe, 1824
- Born: Aleksey Petrovich Yermolov; 4 June 1777; Moscow, Russian Empire
- Died: 23 April 1861 (aged 83); Moscow, Russian Empire
- Education: Moscow State University
- Military career
- Allegiance: Russia
- Branch: Imperial Russian Army
- Service years: 1787–1827
- Rank: General of the Infantry
- Unit: Preobrazhensky Life Guards Regiment
- Conflicts: List: Kościuszko Uprising; Storming of Praga; Persian Expedition of 1796; Storming of Derbent; Napoleonic Wars; Battle of Amstetten; Battle of Krems; Battle of Austerlitz; Battle of Eylau; Battle of Guttstadt; Battle of Heilsberg; Battle of Friedland; Battle of Valutino; Battle of Borodino; Battle of Tarutino; Battle of Maloyaroslavets; Battle of Vyazma; Battle of Krasny; Battle of Lutzen; Battle of Bautzen; Battle of Reichenbach; Battle of Kulm; Battle of Leipzig; Storming of Paris; Caucasian War; Battle of Paraul (Note: Paraul, Republic of Dagestan); Battle of Dzhengutay (Note: Nizhny Dzhengutay, capital of the Mehtuli Khanate); Battle of Dadi-yurt; Yermolov's campaign to Akusha; Battle of Levashi (Note: Now a city of the Republic of Dagestan); Russo-Persian War (1826–28); Crimean War
- Awards: Order of St. Andrew; Order of St. George; Order of St. Vladimir; Order of Saint Anna; Order of St. Alexander Nevsky; Order of the White Eagle

Aleksey Petrovich Yermolov (Note: In this name that follows East Slavic naming customs, the patronymic is Petrovich and the family name is Yermolov.) (Note: Also transliterated Aleksei Ermolov and known in some English language sources originating from German as Alexei Petrowitsch Jermolow; as well known as Alexey in English by his first name.) (Russian: Алексей Петрович Ермолов, IPA: [jɪrˈmoləf]; 4 June [O.S. 24 May] 1777 – 23 April [O.S. 11 April] 1861) was a Russian general of the 19th century who commanded Russian troops in the Caucasian War. He served in all the Russian campaigns against the French, except for the 1799 campaigns of Alexander Suvorov in northern Italy and Switzerland. During this time he was accused of conspiracy against Paul I and sentenced to exile. Two years later he was pardoned and brought back into service by Alexander I. Yermolov distinguished himself during the Napoleonic Wars at the Battles of Austerlitz, Eylau, Borodino, Kulm, and Paris.

== Early life ==
Yermolov was born on 4 June [O.S. 24 May] 1777 (Note: In some sources, the year of his birth is given as 1772.) in Moscow to an old Russian noble family from the Oryol Governorate. His father, Pyotr Alekseyevich Yermolov, owned a small estate with 150 serfs in the Mtsensky Uyezd of the Oryol Governorate. According to the practice of the time, Yermolov was officially enrolled in the Preobrazhensky Life Guards Regiment as a child (for future service). He attended the boarding school of the Moscow University from 1784 to 1791. In 1791, he was promoted to lieutenant and transferred to the Nizhny Novgorod Dragoon Regiment with the rank of captain. For a short time in 1793, he taught at the Artillery and Engineer Cadet Corps. In 1794, he was sent to fight against the Polish rebellion. He fought in the Battle of Praga and received the Order of St. George (4th class) on 12 January 1795. The next year, Yermolov participated in the Persian Expedition of 1796. On 7 January 1799, he was arrested on suspicion of joining a conspiracy against Tsar Paul I and exiled to Kostroma, where he remained for two years. He taught himself Latin while in exile.

After the assassination of Paul I in 1801, the new emperor, Alexander I, pardoned Yermolov, who returned to the military and began studying the works of Alexander Suvorov, whose disciple he now considered himself. Yermolov was appointed to the 8th Artillery Regiment on 13 May 1801; he was then transferred to the horse artillery company on 21 June 1801.

== Napoleonic Wars ==
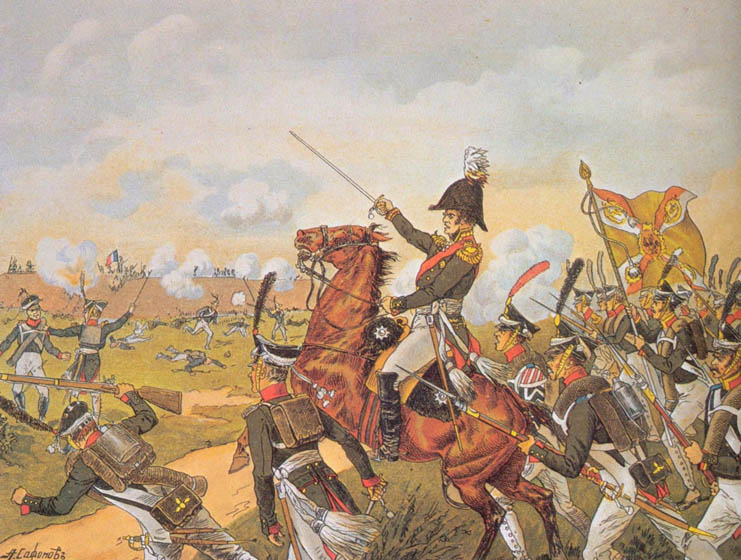
Yermolov leading the counterattack on the Great Redoubt (Raevsky redoubt) during the Battle of Borodino

His own military genius blossomed during the Napoleonic Wars. During the War of the Third Coalition, Yermolov served in the rear and advance guards and distinguished himself at Amstetten and Austerlitz. For his actions, he was promoted to colonel on 16 July 1806. The following year, he participated in the campaign in Poland, serving in Prince Bagration's advance guard. He distinguished himself commanding an artillery company in numerous rearguard actions during the retreat to Landsberg as well as in the Battle of Eylau. In June 1807, Yermolov commanded horse artillery company in the actions at Guttstadt and Deppen, Heilsberg and Friedland, being awarded the Order of St. George (3rd class, 7 September 1807). He was promoted to major general on 28 March 1808 and was appointed inspector of horse artillery companies. In early 1809, he inspected artillery companies of the Army of the Danube. Although his division took part in the 1809 campaign against Austria, Yermolov commanded the reserves in Volhynia and Podolsk gubernias, where he remained for the next two years. In 1811, he took command of the guard artillery company and in 1812, became the Chief of Staff of the First Western Army.

During the 1812 Campaign, Yermolov took part in the retreat to Smolensk and played an important role in the quarrel between Generals Barclay de Tolly and Bagration. He opposed Barclay's strategy and appealed to Emperor Alexander I to replace him with Bagration. After the Russian armies united on 2 August, Yermolov fought at Smolensk and Lubino (Valutina Gora) for which he was promoted to lieutenant general on 12 November 1812 with seniority dating from 16 August 1812. He distinguished himself at the Battle of Borodino, where he was lightly wounded leading a counterattack that recaptured the Great Redoubt (Raevsky redoubt). For his courage, Yermolov received the Order of St. Anna (1st class). During the rest of the campaign, he served as a duty officer in the headquarters of the main Russian army and fought at Maloyaroslavets.

In October–November 1812, Yermolov served in the advance guard under Miloradovich and fought at Battle of Vyazma and Krasny. In late November, he commanded one of the detachments in the advance guard under General Rosen taking part in the combats on the Berezina. On 3 December 1812, he was recalled to the main headquarters where he became the Chief of Staff of the Russian army. Three weeks later, he was appointed commander of the artillery of the Russian armies.

During the European campaigns of 1813 and 1814, Yermolov was in charge of the artillery corps of the allies. His able command proved crucial to their success in the Battle of Kulm. In 1813, Yermolov fought at Lützen, where he was accused of insubordination and transferred to command the 2nd Guard Division. He then fought at Bautzen, commanded the Russian rearguard, which fought against Napoleon himself near Reichenbach during the retreat (unsuccessfully, replaced by Eugen of Württemberg), and at Kulm where he was decorated with the Prussian Iron Cross. In 1814, he distinguished himself in the battle around Paris and was awarded the Order of St. George on 7 April 1814.

== Caucasus ==
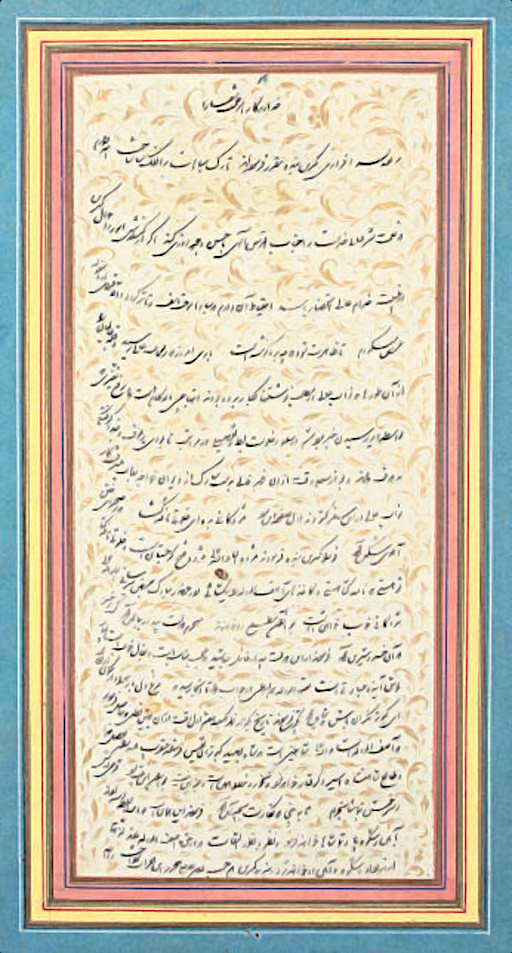
Persian letter regarding the dismissal of Yermolov during the Russo-Persian War (1826-1828). The unsigned and undated letter notes that Yermolov was dismissed following an Iranian victory in what is present-day Georgia

Yermolov's main tasks were to secure Russia's hold over Georgia and the khanates recently taken from Persia, to occupy the Caucasus range separating the new territories from the rest of the Empire and to subdue the 'savage' and hostile Muslim tribes inhabiting it. This campaign included atrocities against non-combatants, including the "hanging of women and children in public squares". But first he had another, most urgent task: Yermolov had to travel on a mission to Tehran, to evade the execution of Alexander I's promise to restore to Fath-Ali Shah Qajar part of the territories acquired by Russia in the Treaty of Gulistan of 1813.

During his tenure as commander-in-chief in the Caucasus, Yermolov (by that time promoted to the rank of full artillery general) was responsible for robust Russian military policies there. He was appointed commander-in-chief of the Russian forces in Georgia and commander of the Independent Georgian Corps on 21 April 1816. He proved himself an able administrator and successfully negotiated with Persia in 1818, receiving promotion to general of infantry on 4 March 1818.

In 1817, he fortified a ford on the Sunzha river and founded the fortress of Grozny the following year. Under him new towns were built (he founded Pyatigorsk and Kislovodsk) and state funds were allocated to improve the existing ones, especially the cities of Transcaucasia; he started the reconstruction of Tiflis in the European style, as well as to improve and build communication routes (first of all, the Georgian Military Road). After repelling an attack by the highlanders, he undertook a punitive raid against them. His decisive measures succeeded in keeping many of the allied tribes loyal.

For ten years he was both commander-in-chief of the Georgian armies and the imperial ambassador to Persia. His independent character would often lead him to conflicts with the Ministry of War, exacerbated by the personal antagonism of many of its members. He was adored by his soldiers, often fraternising with them, and generally successful in combatting the highlanders of Dagestan, but failed to prevent multiple uprisings.

When, in 1825, Yermolov found out that Alexander Griboyedov was about to be arrested on charges relating to the Decembrist revolt, he warned him of it, enabling Griboyedov to destroy some compromising papers and avoid arrest.

Yermolov's career came to an abrupt end in 1827 and he was replaced with Nicholas I's favorite, Ivan Paskevich. The exact reasons are unclear, but he was disliked by Nicholas and was blamed for not keeping the tribes in check. As Moshe Gammer writes:

Far from subduing the population, as his admirers up to the present have asserted, his activities rather intensified hatred to Russia, stiffened resistance to it and helped to enhance the role of Islam, in the form of the spread of the Naqshbandi tariqa (Sufi brotherhood) which would leave now resistance in the eastern part of the Caucasus and for some periods of time in some of its western parts too.

Yermolov was discharged on 7 December 1827 with a full pension. However, four years later, Nicholas restored him in the rank (6 November 1831) and appointed him to the State Council; Yermolov's rank of general of infantry was confirmed in 1833.

== Retirement ==
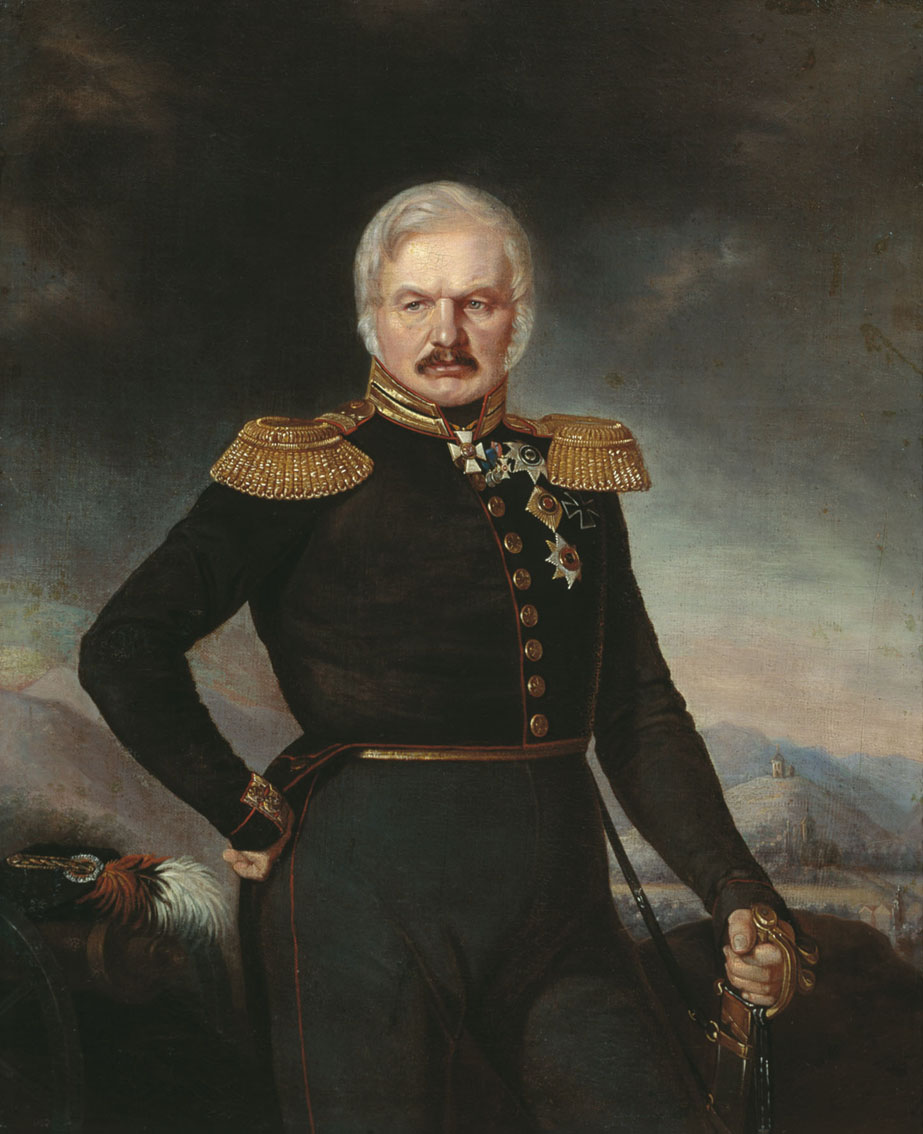
Portrait by Pyotr Zakharov-Chechenets (c.1843)

During the last 30 years of his life, Yermolov lived in seclusion at his manor near Oryol. He was asked to lead a peasant militia during the Crimean War but declined on account of poor health. He died on 23 April [O.S. 11 April] 1861 in Moscow and was buried at the Trinity Church in Oryol. He left memoirs of his service in 1796–1816. His Zapiski (Memoirs) are divided into three parts covering his early career, the Napoleonic Wars, and his service in the Caucasus. They were published posthumously in two volumes.

== Awards ==
In addition to the decorations already mentioned, Yermolov was decorated with the Russian Orders of St. Andrew the First Called, of St. Vladimir (1st class), of St. Alexander Nevsky, of the White Eagle, and of St. Anna (1st class); foreign orders received included the Prussian Orders of the Red Eagle (1st class) and the Pour le Mérite, the Military Order of Maria Theresa (3rd class), the Baden Order of Karl Friedrich, the Persian Order of the Lion and the Sun, and two golden swords for courage (including one with diamonds).

== Legacy ==
In Russia, he was famous for military prowess, bravery and strategy. His charismatic leadership of imperial armies was romanticized in poems by Alexander Pushkin, Vasily Zhukovsky, and others.

However, in the Caucasus (with the exception of Ossetia), Yermolov is infamous for atrocities he had committed. As historian Charles King puts it:

Ermolov [sic] was a quintessential frontier conqueror. He was the first to employ a comprehensive strategy for the subjugation of the Caucasus highlands, and his brutal methods would be used, in one form or another, by tsarists, Bolsheviks, and Russian generals into the twenty-first century. Ermolov [sic] was the most celebrated and, at the same time, the most hated of Russian commanders in the Caucasus theater. To St. Petersburg society he was the gallant, Latin-quoting senior officer. For generations of indigenous mountaineers he was the dreaded "Yarmul" who razed villages and slaughtered families. Although he gained the supreme confidence of one Tsar, Alexander I, he was treated with suspicion by another, Nicholas I. He was responsible for implementing a series of policies that were at the time hailed as vehicles for civilizing the benighted Caucasus frontier but today might very well be called state-sponsored terrorism.

John F. Baddeley, author of Russian Conquest of the Caucasus (Chapter VI, 1908), described him in 1908:

In person no less than in character Yermolov impressed all who came near him as one born to command. Of gigantic stature and uncommon physical strength, with round head set on mighty shoulders and framed in shaggy locks, there was something leonine in his whole appearance, which, coupled with unsurpassed courage, was well calculated to excite the admiration of his own men and strike terror into his semi-barbarous foes. Incorruptibly honest, simple, even rude in his habit, and of Spartan hardihood, his sword was ever at his side, and in city as in camp he slept wrapped only in his military cloak, and rose with the sun.

Since 2000, Kalach-on-don has been operating a multi-purpose ship of the KC-104-02 project named after the hero of the Patriotic war of 1812 — "General Yermolov", as an object of intangible heritage that preserves the historical memory of the people.
