= Battle of Dadi-yurt =

Military action against Dadi-yurt (1819)

Coordinates: 43.2443°N 46.1237°E

- Part of the Caucasian War and Chechen genocide
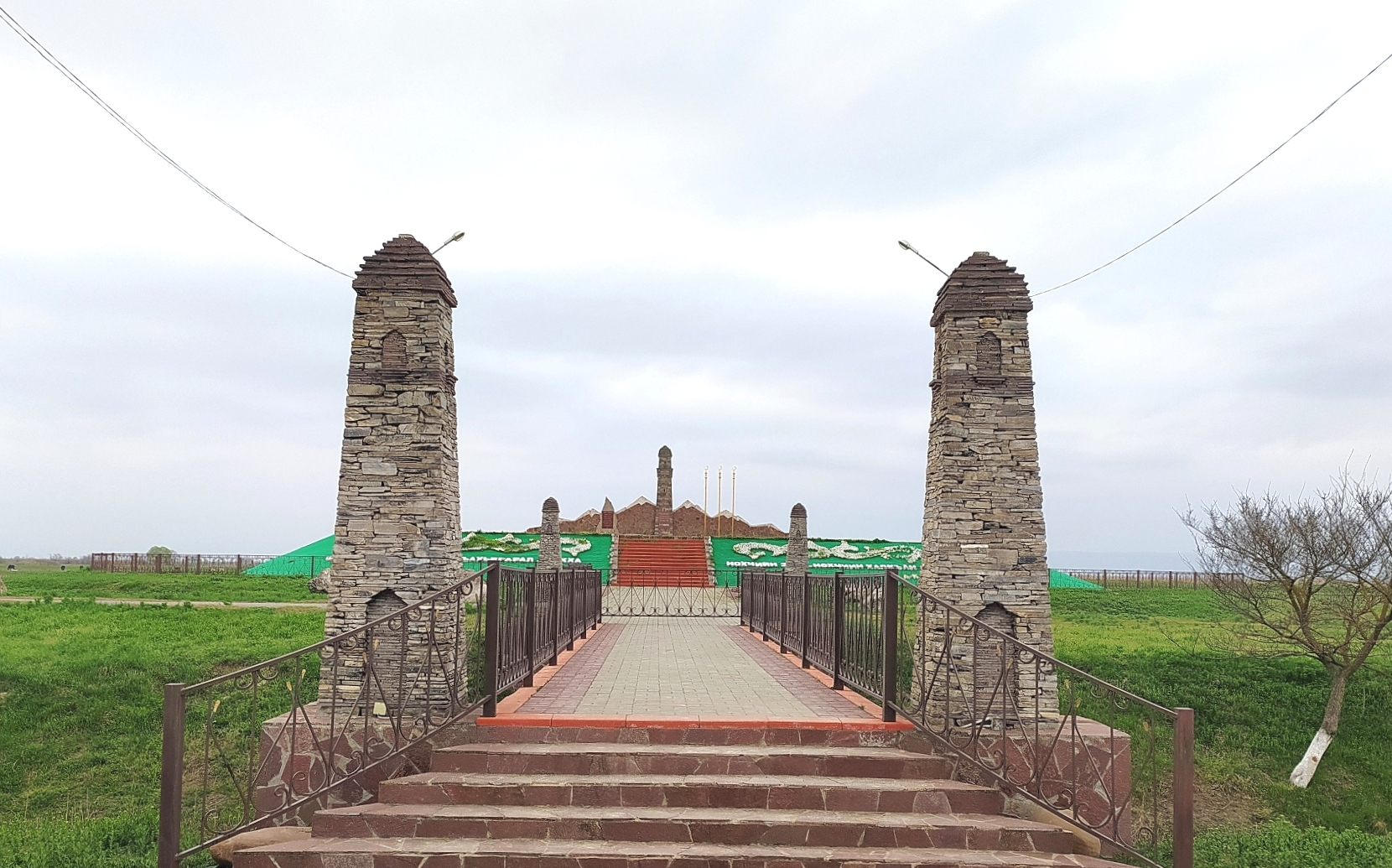
- Memorial Dadi-Yurt
Date	26 September 1819
Location	Dadi-yurt, Chechnya
Result	Russian victory

Belligerents
Russian Empire	Chechens

Commanders and leaders
A. P. Yermolov; V. A. Sysoev	No leader

Strength
2,200: ~1,500 Russian troops; 700 Cossacks	400 armed inhabitants

Casualties and losses
300 killed or wounded	Killed about 400 armed men and civilians. Up to 140 women and children and 14 wounded men were taken prisoner.

The Battle of Dadi-yurt was the capture of the village of Dadi-yurt on 14 (26) September 1819 by order of General Yermolov. During the storm by the Russian forces, the village was completely destroyed.

== Background of the operation ==
During the conquest of the Caucasus (see Caucasian War), the Russian Empire met with fierce resistance from local residents, and the settlers were faced with the need to resist the raids of the natives.

The specific reason that prompted the operation against Dadi-Yurt was a raid, during which the Chechens stole a herd of horses from one of the regiments of the Caucasian line. According to General A. P. Yermolov, Dadi-Yurt was chosen for a punitive expedition long ago due to the fact that the inhabitants of the village were the most daring and successful robbers among the Chechens. As John Baddeley stated in 1908, «the inhabitants of the village mainly hunted by robbery, but they so skillfully covered up the traces of their dirty deeds that it was very rarely possible to prove their guilt».

However, Yermolov himself wrote in one of his letters:

Such an example has not yet been seen in this region, and I only gave it for that, in order to spread horror.

A detachment of Major General Vasily Sysoev was assigned to carry out the operation, consisting of six companies of the Kabardian regiment and 700 Cossacks with six guns.

== Assault on the village ==
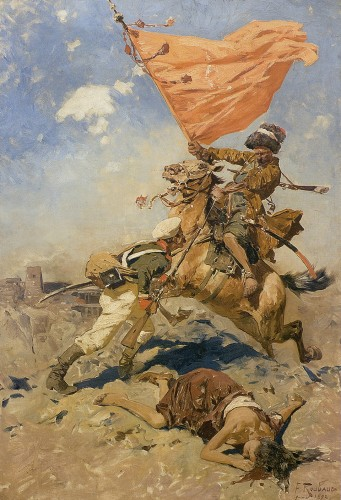
Caucasian rider in fight with Russian soldier, scene from the Caucasian war. By Franz Roubaud, 1892 г.

At dawn on 14 September, Sysoev’s detachment approached the village. Residents were asked to leave their homes and move across the Sunzha River. Having been refused, the Russians attacked the village. The battle was extremely fierce, each saklya, surrounded by a stone wall, had to be taken by storm, with the help of artillery shelling, breaking through the fence, and then — in hand-to-hand combat, killing the defenders. Numerous murders of Chechen women and children were noted during the assault. The battle lasted all day and ended only in the evening after the complete extermination of the resisters. One hundred and forty women and children who asked for mercy were left alive, a significantly larger number died during the battle at the hands of the stormers or because of the fires that started. Russian soldiers plundered what the fire spared, their booty turned out to be quite rich. The village of two hundred houses was wiped off the face of the earth and was no longer restored.

== Memory ==
In 1990, near the village, at the entrance to Khangish-Yurt, a memorial was built — a simple mound with tombstones, dedicated to the memory of 46 Chechen girls, who, according to stories, when crossing the Terek rushed into the water and dragged the guards along with them.

In memory of the events in the village since 2009, Chechnya celebrates the Day of the Chechen Woman on the third Sunday of September. On this day in 2013, the memorial was opened after reconstruction. Now it is a composition in the form of a mountain range, in the middle of which a Chechen military tower rises. A number of Russian news agencies regarded this as a controversial step, a kind of «war of monuments» against monuments to General Yermolov.

The story of the death of Dadi-Yurt and the names of the main characters of this drama have been preserved in Chechen toponymy. At the place where Dadi-Yurt stood, to this day there is «Mekhkariy bella getcho» — «Ford where the girls died».
