= Tarnowski =

Tarnowski (feminine: Tarnowska; plural: Tarnowscy) is a Polish-language toponymic surname derived from the city of Tarnów.

== Related surnames ==
Language	Masculine	Feminine
Polish	Tarnowski	Tarnowska
Belarusian (Romanization)	Тарнаўскі (Tarnaŭski); Тарноўскі (Tarnoŭski)	Тарнаўская (Tarnauskaya, Tarnaŭskaja, Tarnauskaia); Тарноўская (Tarnouskaya, Tarnoŭskaja, Tarnouskaia)
Bulgarian (Romanization)	Търновски (Tarnovski)	
Czech/Slovak	Tarnovský	Tarnovská
Hungarian	Tarnovszki, Tarnovszky	
Latvian	Tarnovskis	Tarnovska
Lithuanian	Tarnauskas	Tarnauskienė (married); Tarnauskaitė (unmarried)
Romanian/Moldovan	Tarnovschi, Tarnovschii	
Russian (Romanization)	Тарновский (Tarnovskiy, Tarnovskii, Tarnovskij, Tarnovsky, Tarnovski)	Тарновская (Tarnovskaya, Tarnovskaia, Tarnovskaja)
Ukrainian (Romanization)	Тарновський (Tarnovskyi, Tarnovskyy, Tarnovskyj, Tarnovsky)	Тарновська (Tarnovska)
Other	Tarnowsky, Tarnofsky, Tarnofski	

== People ==
- Tarnowski family, a Polish noble family
- Adam Tarnowski (senior) (1866–1946), Polish and Austrian-Hungarian diplomat
- Adam Tarnowski (minister) (1892–1956), Polish and Austrian-Hungarian diplomat
- Alfred Tarnowski (1917–2003), Polish chess player
- Barbara Tarnowska (c. 1566–1610), Polish noblewoman
- Dorota Tarnowska (c. 1513 – c. 1540), Polish noblewoman
- Jan Tarnowski (1488–1561), Polish military commander and statesman
- Jan "Ciezki" Tarnowski (c. 1479–1527), Polish nobleman
- Jan Feliks "Szram" Tarnowski (1471–1507), Polish nobleman
- Jan Krzysztof Tarnowski (1537–1567), Polish nobleman
- Josef Tarnowski (1922–2010), Polish electronics engineer and intelligence officer
- Marcin Tarnowski (born 1985), Polish footballer
- Maria Tarnowska (1877–1949), Russian convict
- Maria Tarnowska (nurse) (1880–1965), Polish nurse
- Paweł Tarnowski (footballer) (born 1990), Polish footballer
- Paweł Tarnowski (sailor) (born 1994), Polish sailor
- Stanisław Tarnowski (1837–1917), Polish politician
- Władysław Tarnowski (1836–1878), Polish composer
- Zofia Tarnowska (1534–1570), Polish noblewoman
- Sophie Moss, nee Tarnowska (1917–2009), Polish humanitarian
