= Newerkla =

Newerkla is a surname. It is very rare, but it can be found in Austria, Germany, or Brazil. Notable people with this surname include:

- Nikolaus Newerkla (born 1974), an Austrian musician
- Stefan Michael Newerkla (born 1972), an Austrian linguist
