= John Playford =

London publisher and bookseller (1623–1686)

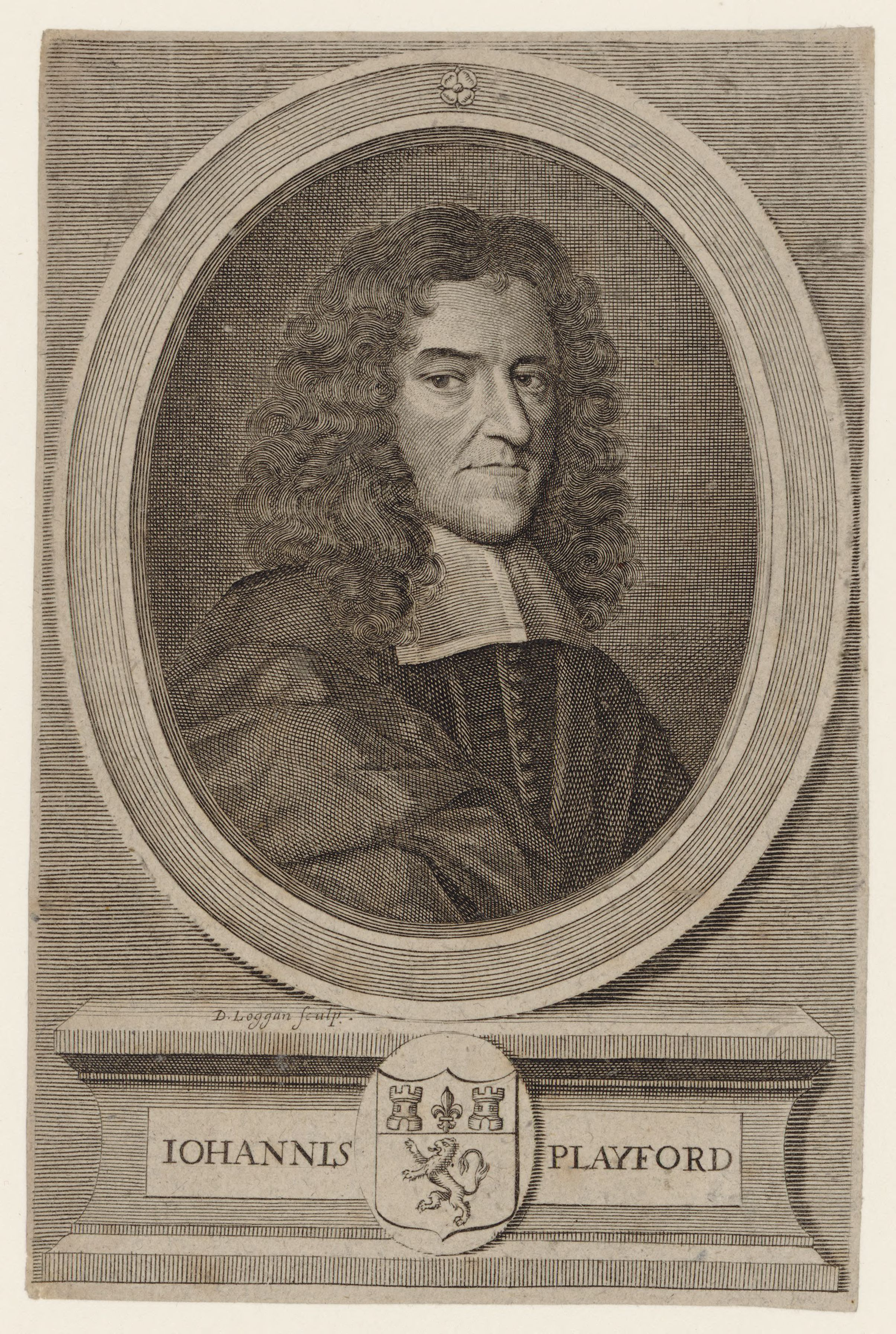
John Playford portrait by David Loggan

John Playford (1623–1686) was a London bookseller, publisher, minor composer and member of the Stationers' Company. He published books on music theory, instruction books for several instruments and psalters with tunes for singing in churches. He is perhaps best known today for his publication of The English Dancing Master in 1651.

Under the Commonwealth (1649–60), and for part of Charles II's reign, Playford almost monopolised the business of music publishing in England. His shop was the meeting-place of musical enthusiasts.

== Biography ==
John Playford (1623-1686) - Parthenia, No. 7, Musicks Recreation on the Viol, Lyra-Way, 1669
Performed by Phillip W. Serna

John Playford (1623-1686) - Gerards Mistresse, No. 55, Musicks Recreation on the Viol, Lyra-Way, 1652
Performed by Phillip W. Serna

John Playford (1623-1686) - Franklin, No.23 & Focky Went to the Wood, No. 27, Musicks Recreation on the Viol, Lyra-Way, 1669 & 1682
Performed by Phillip W. Serna

John Playford (1623-1686) - Farewell Fair Armida, No. 94, Musicks Recreation on the Viol, Lyra-Way, 1682
Performed by Phillip W. Serna

John Playford (1623-1686) - Amarillis, No. 69, Musicks Recreation on the Viol, Lyra-Way, 1682
Performed by Phillip W. Serna

Playford was born in Norwich, the younger son of John Playford. He served an apprenticeship in London with publisher John Benson from 1639/40 to 1647, after which he remained in the capital, opening a shop in the porch of Temple Church. Playford was clerk to the church, and probably resided with his wife Hannah over the shop until 1659. He was, it appears (from the title-pages of his publications) temporarily in partnership with John Benson in 1652, and with Zachariah Watkins in 1664 and 1665. Under the Commonwealth (1649–60), and for some years of Charles II's reign, Playford almost monopolised the business of music publishing in England. His shop was the meeting-place of musical enthusiasts; Samuel Pepys was a frequent customer.

Bookseller, publisher, and member of the Stationers' Company, Playford published books on music theory, instruction books for several instruments, and psalters with tunes for singing in churches. He is perhaps best known today for his publication of The English Dancing Master in 1651, during the period of the Puritan-dominated Commonwealth (later editions were known as 'The Dancing Master'). This work contains both the music and instructions for English country dances. This came about after Playford, working as an English Civil War correspondent, was captured by Cromwell's men and told that, if he valued his freedom (as a sympathiser with the King), he might consider a change of career. Although many of the tunes in the book are attributed to him today, he probably did not write any of them. Most were popular melodies that had existed for years.

During the Restoration period, on the other hand, he endeavoured to encourage serious tastes. In 1662 he dedicated the 'Cantica Sacra' to Queen Henrietta Maria. He regretfully observed in 1666 that 'all solemn musick was much laid aside, being esteemed too heavy and dull for the light heels and brains of this nimble and wanton age,' and he therefore ventured to 'new string the harp of David' by issuing fresh editions of his 'Skill of Music,' with music for church service, in 1674, and, in 1677, 'The Whole Book of Psalms' in which he gave for the first time the church tunes to the cantus part.

In typographical technique Playford's most original improvement was the invention in 1658 of 'the new-ty'd note.' These were quavers or semiquavers connected in pairs or series by one or two horizontal strokes at the end of their tails, the last note of the group retaining in the early examples the characteristic up-stroke. Hawkins observes that the Dutch printers were the first to follow the lead in this detail. In 1665 he caused every semibreve to be barred in the dance tunes; in 1672 he began engraving on copper plates. Generally, however, Playford clung to old methods; he recommended the use of lute tablature to ordinary violin players; and he resisted, in an earnest letter of remonstrance (1673), Thomas Salmon's proposals for a readjustment of clefs. Playford's printers were: Thomas Harper, 1648–1652; William Godbid, 1658–1678; Ann Godbid and her partner John Playford the younger, 1679–1683; John Playford alone, 1684-1685.

By 1665 Playford and his wife moved from the Temple to a large house opposite Islington Church, where Mrs. Playford kept a boarding-school until her death in October 1679. By November 1680, Playford had established himself in a house in Arundel Street 'near the Thames side, the lower end, over against the George.' He suffered from a long illness in that year, and retired, leaving the main running of the business to his son Henry Playford (see below). He brought out, in his own name, a collection of catches in 1685; The Dancing Master of 1686 was the last work for which he was responsible.

He apparently died in Arundel Street about November 1686. His will was written on 5 November 1686, neither signed nor witnessed, and only proved in August 1694, the handwriting being identified by witnesses. He was probably buried in the Temple Church as he desired, although the registers do not record his name. Henry Purcell and John Blow attended the funeral. Several elegies upon his death were published; one written by Nahum Tate, and set to music by Purcell, appeared in 1687.

Playford's original compositions were few and slight, and included some vocal and instrumental pieces in the following collections: Catch ... or the Musical Companion, 1667; Choice Songs, 1673; Cantica Sacra, 1674; The Whole Book of Psalms and The Harmonicon.

== Family ==
=== Henry Playford ===
After Playford's death, his only surviving son, Henry Playford (5 May 1657 - 1706?), carried on the business at the shop near the Temple Church. In partnership with Robert Carr, Henry published three books of 'The Theatre of Musick;' the fourth book and his other publications appeared independently of Carr. In 1694, he sold his copyright in 'The Dancing Master' to printer, John Heptinstall. From 1696 to 1703, Playford traded in the "Temple Exchange" 'over against St. Dunstan's Church in Fleet Street.' He employed as printers, John Playford the younger, 1685; Charles Peregrine, 1687; E. Jones, 1687, 1696; John Heptinstall, 1696; and William Pearson, 1698. Around 1701 he instituted weekly clubs for the practice of music, which flourished in Oxford as well as in London.

Playford, in order to meet competition from purveyors of cheap music, established, in 1699, a music concert to be held three evenings in the week at a coffee house. Here his music was to be sold, and might be heard at the request of any prospective purchaser. He complained of the expense of good-quality paper, and of the scandalous abuse of selling single songs at a penny a piece, a practice 'which hindered good collections.' In 1703 Playford invited subscriptions to the 'Monthly Collections of Music' to be sent to his house in Arundel Street, The Strand, 'over against the Blue Ball.' From 1703 to 1707 he also seems to have engaged in selling prints, paintings, 'and other adornments.' In 1706, his warehouse was a room 'up one pair of stairs next the Queen's Head Tavern over against the Middle Temple Gate.' His name appears on the fifth edition of ' The Pleasant Musical Companion,' dated 1707, but as a rule these publications were antedated; and his name does not occur again in advertisements or on title-pages. He died between 1706 and 1721, when his will was proved. He left a legacy to Henry Purcell, and the bulk of his property to his wife Ann (née Baker - daughter of Thomas Baker of Oxford), whom he had married in December 1688.

=== John Playford the Younger ===
The music printer and stationer John Playford the younger (1656–1686), nephew of John Playford the elder, entered in 1679 into partnership with Ann, the widow of William Godbid, in the printing-house at Little Britain, 'the ancient and only printing-house in England for variety of musick and workmen that understand it.' It was also the chief printing-house for setting up mathematical works.

Playford's firm printed the sixth edition of The Dancing Master in 1679, and other musical publications. In 1684, Mrs. Godbid's name disappeared, and Playford continued the business alone. His last work for his uncle was the seventh edition of The Dancing Master, dated 1686; he printed only one of Henry's publications, The Theatre of Musick, 1685. He died in that year, and was buried in Great Stanmore church. Playford left his property to his mother Eleanor, and to his two sisters, Anne (wife of William Killigrew), and Eleanor (who afterwards married William Walker). The printing-house (and dwelling house) was advertised for sale in the London Gazette of 6 May 1686.

== Selected publications ==
Grimstock
A modern recreation of a musical score found in Playford's The English Dancing Master

- The English Dancing Master (1651)
- A Musicall Banquet (1651)
- Catch that Catch Can (1652)
- A Booke of New Lessons for the Cithern & Gittern (1652, revised 1666 as Musick's Delight on the Cithren)
- Musick's Recreation on the Lyra Viol (1652)
- A Breefe Introduction to the Skill of Musick (1654)
- Court Ayres (1655)
- Choice Musick to the Psalmes of David (1656)
- The Whole Book of Psalms (1661)
- The Musical Companion (1667) - songs and catches
- Apollo's Banquet for the Treble Violin (1669)
- Psalms and Hymns (1671) - psalm tunes in four parts
- Musick's Handmaid (1678) - songs for the harpsichord
- The Division Violin (1685) - a set of 26 tunes which start simply and build complex variations ("divisions") on the original melody. While many of the pieces were accessible to amateurs, several featured advanced techniques (for the time) like scordatura, fingered double stops, and large interval leaps across the strings.

== See also ==
- English Country Dance
- The Dancing Master

== Bibliography ==
- Nelson, Russell C., John Playford and the English Amateur Musician (1966), dissertation, University of Iowa.
- Pullen, Ginger Lee, Five Collections of Lyra Viol Music Published by John Playford (1979), dissertation, University of British Columbia.
- Randel, Don Michael, The Harvard Biographical Dictionary of Music (1996), Belknap Press. ISBN 0-674-37299-9.
- Temperley, Nicholas (1972). "John Playford and the Metrical Psalms". Journal of the American Musicological Society. 25 (3): 331–78. doi:10.1525/jams.1972.25.3.03a00030.
- Temperley, Nicholas (1973). "John Playford and the Stationers' Company". Music and Letters. 54 (2): 203–12. doi:10.1093/ml/liv.2.203.
- Thompson, Robert (1995). "Manuscript music in Purcell's London". Early Music. XXIII (4): 605–620. doi:10.1093/earlyj/XXIII.4.605.

== Sheet Music ==
- Nikolaus Newerkla. Playford Dances & Carolan Tunes, selected dance tunes arranged for recorders and basso continuo (Moeck, Celle, Germany, 2007).
- Nikolaus Newerkla. The English Dancing Master, selected tunes arranged for recorders and harpsichord (Bärenreiter, Kassel, Germany, 2012).

== Discography ==
- John Playford’s Popular Tunes. The Broadside Band. AmonRa, 1986.
- English Country Dances. From Playford’s Dancing Master 1651–1703. The Broadside Band. Saydisc, 1991.
- Country Capers. Music from Playford’s The English Dancing Master. The New York Renaissance Band. Arabesque, 1999.
- Nobodys Jig. Les Witches, Odile Edouard (Violine). Alpha, 2002/2008.
- English Country Dances. The Harp Consort, Andrew Lawrence-King (Leitung). HMF, 2002.
- Mr. Playford’s English Dancing Master. Lautten Compagney, conducted by Wolfgang Katschner. Berlin, 2005.
- Oranges & Lemons. The Playfords. Coviello, 2006.
- In the Streets of London: A 17th Century Musical Pub Tour, PRISMA Ensemble, Fuga Libera FUG814 (2023)
- all the CDs of Quadriga Consort contain pieces from the English Dancing Master
