= Volodymyr Horkovenko =

Ukrainian politician

- Born: 24.11.1975; Krasnovolia, Manevychi Raion, Volyn Oblast, Ukrainian SSR
- Citizenship: Ukraine
- Education: Institute of Journalism of the Taras Shevchenko National University of Kyiv

Volodymyr Horkovenko (November 24, 1975, Krasnovolia) is a Ukrainian politician and former journalist. He is involved in corruption scandals related to paid media attack campaigns. He is a member of the National Council of Television and Radio Broadcasting of Ukraine (since May 2019) and a deputy of the Kyiv Regional Council VIII convocation.

== Biography ==
He was educated at the Institute of Journalism of the Taras Shevchenko National University of Kyiv from 1993 to 1998.

He started his career in 1994 as a reporter at TRK "Avers" (Lutsk).

Since 1995, he worked on the "Vikna" program (MMC "Internews"), later as a journalist at "Inter", "ICTV". From February to June 2014, he worked at the "Ukrayina" TV channel.

From 2014 to May 2019, he headed the domestic, regional, and foreign media relations department of the Presidential Administration of Ukraine under Petro Poroshenko, holding the 5th rank of civil servant.

On May 4, 2019, he was appointed a member of the National Council of Television and Radio Broadcasting of Ukraine. On May 24, President Volodymyr Zelenskyy canceled President Poroshenko's decree appointing Horkovenko to the NCTRB.

On December 19, 2010, the Supreme Court declared the President's decree canceling Horkovenko's appointment to the NCTRB unlawful.

On October 25, 2020, he was elected as a deputy of the Kyiv Regional Council from the "European Solidarity" party in constituency No. 3 (Boryspil Raion).

=== Kyiv Post Investigation ===
The Ukrainian English-language newspaper Kyiv Post reported that the entourage of former President Petro Poroshenko paid media outlets for favorable coverage and launched campaigns against critics on social networks. Relevant documents confirming these facts were found in the office of Volodymyr Horkovenko, who at that time held the position of head of the department of the Main Department of Information Policy of the Presidential Administration. According to these documents, during 2015–2016, unofficial information campaigns were initiated, in which supposedly independent bloggers published paid materials favorable to the then president.

=== Conflict with 24 Channel ===
In October 2023, Volodymyr Horkovenko published a blog on the "Censor.net" website, in which he claimed that construction companies trying to obtain urban planning conditions and restrictions from the Lviv City Council allegedly had to pay for advertising in the media holding TRK "Lux", partly owned by the mayor's wife. However, Horkovenko did not name the companies that could be involved in such a scheme and provided no other evidence to support his claims. The politician's statement was quickly picked up by a number of unpopular websites, indicating signs of a paid media campaign. Journalists of the 24 Channel, part of the TRK "Lux" media holding, filed a complaint with the National Anti-Corruption Bureau demanding an investigation into Horkovenko's libel.

=== Ukrenergo bank deal scandal ===
In June 2024, media outlets published materials that showed signs of bias. In these articles, Volodymyr Horkovenko acted as an expert in energy and banking, despite lacking the necessary education and expertise, and attacked Alliance Bank, predicting significant market problems for it. Horkovenko accused the bank, which refused to pay a bank guarantee for a dubious agreement between Ukrenergo and a company close to oligarch Ihor Kolomoiskyi—United Energy, resulting in NEC losing 1.4 billion UAH for supplied electricity. Later, media revealed that according to Volodymyr Horkovenko's declaration, his wife Tetiana purchased a plot of land in Kyiv at the end of 2019 on General Pavlenko Street. Investigators noted that this plot is adjacent to the house of the head of NEC "Ukrenergo" Volodymyr Kudrytskyi.
