= Pyotr Vyazemsky =

Russian poet (1792–1878)

Prince Pyotr Vyazemsky
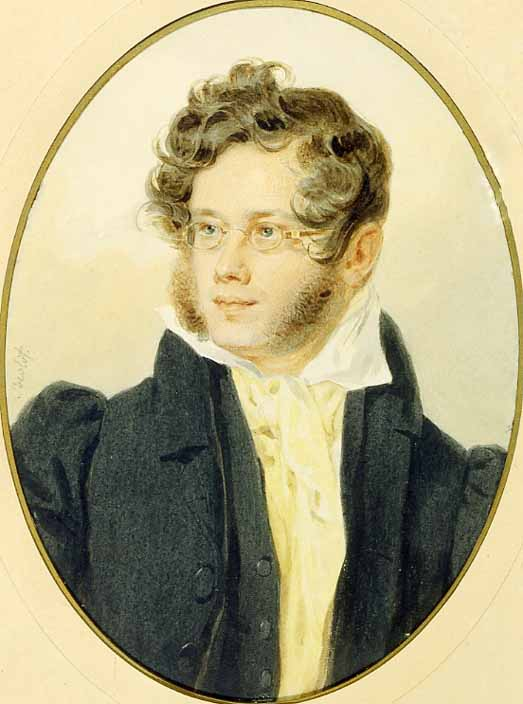
- Vyazemsky (1824) by Pyotr Sokolov
- Born: 23 July 1792; Moscow, Russia
- Died: 22 November 1878 (aged 86); Baden-Baden
- Buried: Tikhvin Cemetery, St. Petersburg, Russia
- Noble family: Vyazemsky
- Spouse: Princess Vera Gagarina (m. 1811)
- Issue: eight, including Pavel
- Father: Prince Andrey Vyazemsky
- Mother: Jenny Quinn O'Reilly
- Occupation: Poet

Prince Pyotr Andreyevich Vyazemsky (Note: Also transliterated as Petr Andreevich Viazemsky) (Russian: Пëтр Андреевич Вяземский; IPA: [ˈpʲɵtr ɐnˈdrʲejɪvʲɪt͡ɕ ˈvʲæzʲɪmskʲɪj]; 23 July 1792 – 22 November 1878) was a Russian poet and a leading personality of the Golden Age of Russian poetry.

== Biography ==
His parents were a Russian prince of Rurikid stock, Prince Andrey Vyazemsky (1754–1807), and an Irish lady, Jenny Quinn O'Reilly (1762–1802), rechristened and russified as Evgenia Ivanovna Vyazemskaya. As a young man he took part in the Battle of Borodino and other engagements of the Napoleonic Wars. Many years later, Tolstoy's description of the battle in War and Peace appeared inaccurate to him, and he engaged in a literary feud with the great novelist.

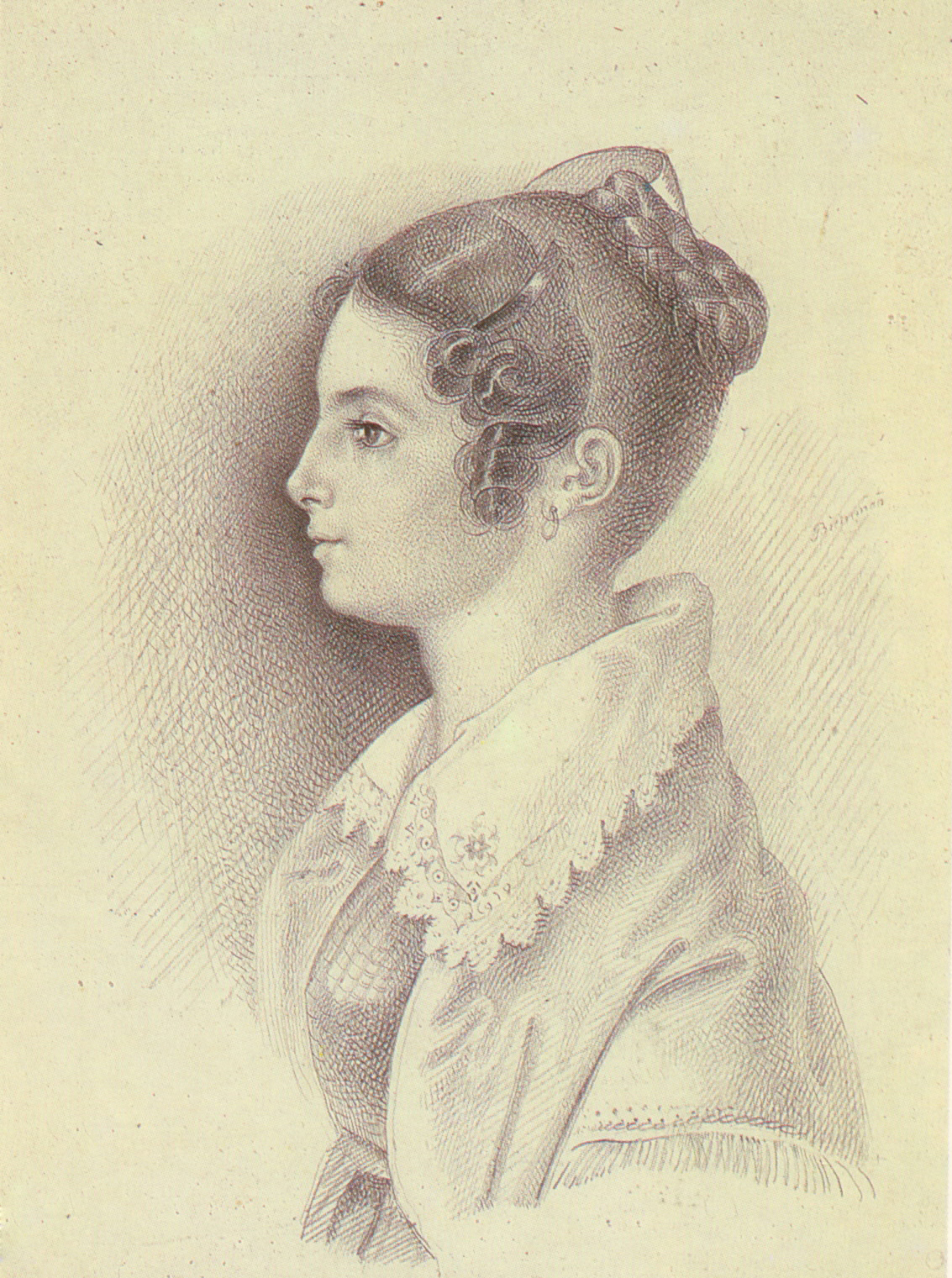
Princess Vera, nee Gagarina, Pyotr's wife

In the 1820s Vyazemsky was the most combative and brilliant champion of what then went by the name of Romanticism. Both Prince Pyotr and his wife Princess Vera (née Gagarina) were on intimate terms with Alexander Pushkin, who often visited their family seat at Ostafievo near Moscow (now a literary museum). Unsurprisingly, Vyazemsky is quoted in Pushkin's works, including Eugene Onegin. The two friends also exchanged several epistles in verse.

Vyazemsky and the other leading Russian liberals, such as Pushkin and Alexander and Nikolay Turgenev, were all heavily shaped by the Kantian teachings of Alexander Kunitsyn and often discussed their attitudes on serfdom, the Russian administrative and legal system, civil society, and foreign policy through private correspondence, where Vyazemsky was highly critical of the administration's abuses in the western provinces. He also published a prospectus declaring an "uncompromising war to all the prejudices, vices and absurdity that reign in our society."

At that time, the elderly poet gained admission to the Russian court, in part through his daughter's marriage to Pyotr Valuev, the future Chairman of the Committee of Ministers. In the 1850s, Vyazemsky served as a deputy minister of education and was in charge of state censorship. In 1863, he settled abroad on account of bad health. Prince Vyazemsky died in Baden-Baden, but his body was brought to Saint Petersburg and buried there.

== Literary output ==
Vyazemsky was a close friend of Alexander Pushkin, with whom he maintained extensive correspondence. Their letters contain literary criticism, discussions and observations on contemporary Russian society. In the early 1820s, Pushkin described Vyazemsky as the finest prose writer in the country. His prose is caracterised by wit and wordplay, particularly in the anecdotes collected in his Old Notebook, which contains observations about prominent and lesser-known figures of the early nineteenth century. A major prose work of his later years was his biography of Denis Fonvizin, the eighteenth-century Russian dramatist.

Though Vyazemsky was the journalistic leader of Russian Romanticism, there can be nothing less romantic than his early poetry: it consists either of very elegant, polished, and cold exercises on the set commonplaces of poetry, or of brilliant essays in word play, where pun begets pun, and conceit begets conceit, heaping up mountains of verbal wit. His later poetry became more universal and essentially classical.

== Bibliography ==
- Newerkla, Stefan Michael. Das irische Geschlecht O'Reilly und seine Verbindungen zu Österreich und Russland [The Irish O'Reilly family and their connections to Austria and Russia], in: Diachronie – Ethnos – Tradition: Studien zur slawischen Sprachgeschichte [Diachrony – Ethnos – Tradition: Studies in Slavic Language History]. Eds. Jasmina Grković-Major, Natalia B. Korina, Stefan M. Newerkla, Fedor B. Poljakov, Svetlana M. Tolstaja. Brno: Tribun EU 2020; ISBN 978-80-263-1581-0, pp. 259–279 (open access), here pp. 272–273.
- Венгеров С. А. Источники словаря русских писателей, т. I, СПб. 1900.
- Бондаренко В.В. Вяземский. М., 2004 (серия "Жизнь замечательных людей")
- Гинзбург А. Вяземский литератор, Сборник «Русская проза», под ред. Б. Эйхенбаума и Ю. Тынянова, Л., 1926.
- Грот Я., Сухомлинов М., Пономарев С., в Сборнике 2 отделения Академии наук, т. XX, 1880.
- Кульман H. Вяземский как критик. Известия Академии наук. книга 1. 1904.
- Собрание сочинений Вяземского в 12 тт. СПб. 1878—1886, его переписка, «Остафьевский архив», т. I—V.
- Спасович В. Вяземский и его польские отношения и знакомства. Сочинения Спасовича, т. VIII, 1896.
- Трубачев С. С. Вяземский как писатель 20-х гг., «Исторический вестник», Ї 8, 1892.
- Языков Д. П. Вяземский. — М. 1904.
