= Paweł Tarnowski =

Paweł Tarnowski may refer to:

- Paweł Tarnowski (footballer)
- Paweł Tarnowski (sailor)
