= Richard Andree =

German geographer (1835–1912)

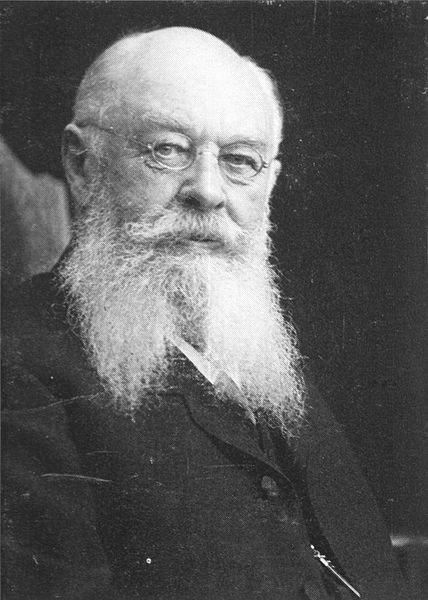
- Portrait of Andree, c. 1900
- Born: February 26, 1835; Braunschweig, Duchy of Brunswick, German Confederation
- Died: February 22, 1912 (aged 76); Munich, Kingdom of Bavaria, German Empire
- Education: Collegium Carolinum; Leipzig University
- Occupation: Cartographer
- Era: 19th–20th century
- Known for: Ethnographic works
- Notable work: Allgemeiner Handatlas
- Spouse: Marie Andree-Eysn
- Father: Karl Andree

Richard Andree (26 February 1835 – 22 February 1912) was a German geographer and cartographer, noted for devoting himself especially to ethnographic studies. He wrote numerous books on this subject, dealing notably with the races of his own country, while an important general work was Ethnographische Parallelen und Vergleiche (Stuttgart, 1878).

== Biography ==
Andree was born in Braunschweig, the son of geographer Karl Andree (1808–1875). He followed in the footsteps of his father, studied natural sciences at the Braunschweig Collegium Carolinum and Leipzig University, and temporarily worked in a Bohemian ironworks. As a director of the geography bureau of publisher Velhagen & Klasing in Leipzig from 1873 to 1890, he also took up cartography, having a chief share in the production of the Physikalisch-Statistischer Atlas des Deutschen Reichs (together with Oscar Peschel, Leipzig, 1877) and the Allgemeiner Historischer Handatlas, (with Gustav Droysen, son of Johann Gustav Droysen, Leipzig, 1886) as well as school atlases.

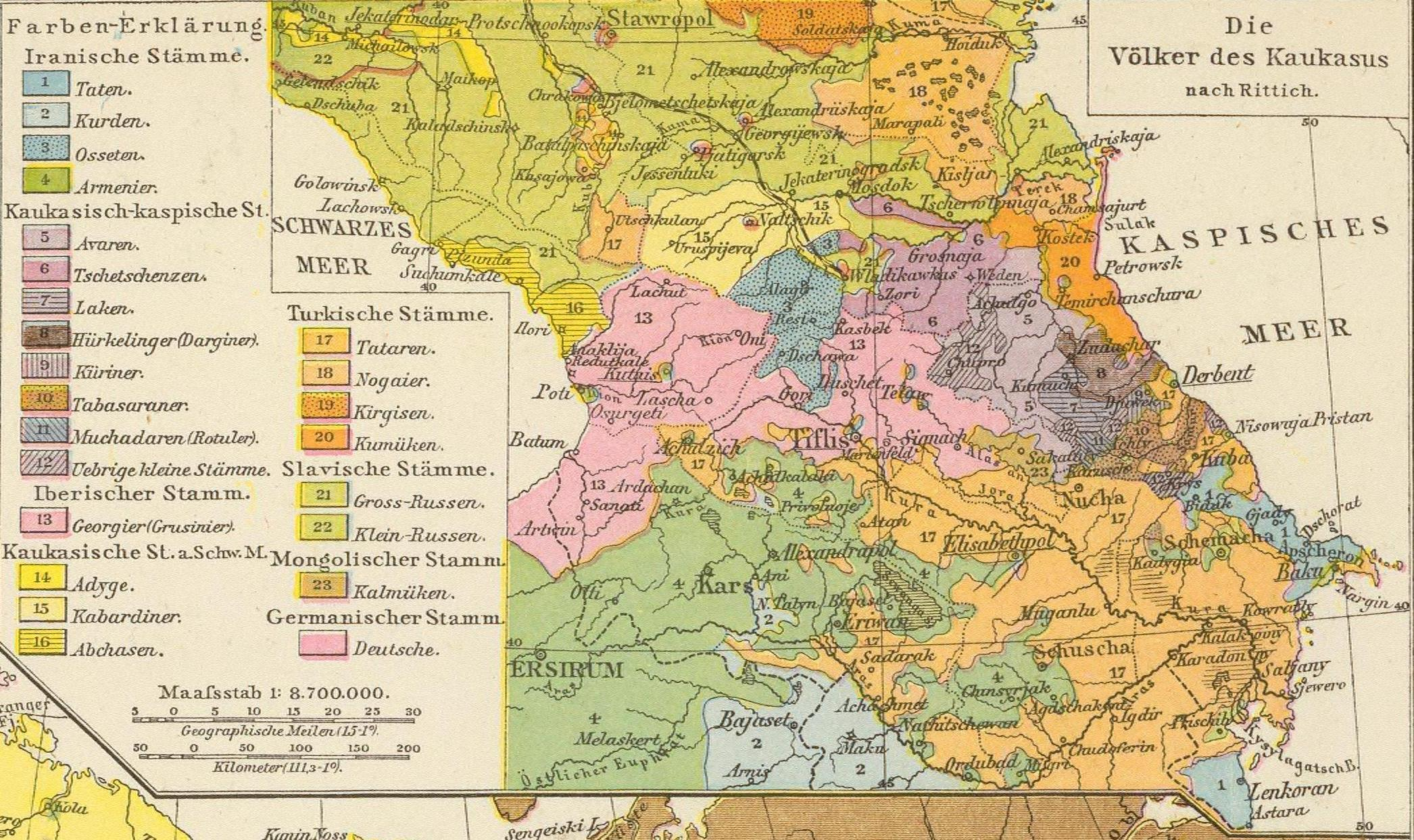
Ethnographic map of the Caucasus region, 1881

Andree's main work, however, is his Allgemeiner Handatlas (Leipzig, first edition 1881, final edition 1937), one of the most comprehensive world atlases of all times. The early editions of the Times Atlas of the World (1895–1900) are based on this atlas, as was Cassell's Universal Atlas. Andree became an elected member of the Academy of Sciences Leopoldina in 1886. In 1890 he moved to Heidelberg, where he continued the editorship of the academic journal Globus from 1891 until 1903. Andree made important contributions to comparative ethnographic studies of countries and people, advocating Adolf Bastian's ideas of a common basic mental framework shared by all humans. His work also influenced Arnošt Muka's studies of the Sorbian culture.

In 1903 Andree married Marie Eysn who became known as Marie Andree-Eysn. Andree died aged 76 in Munich, which had been the couple's hometown since 1904.

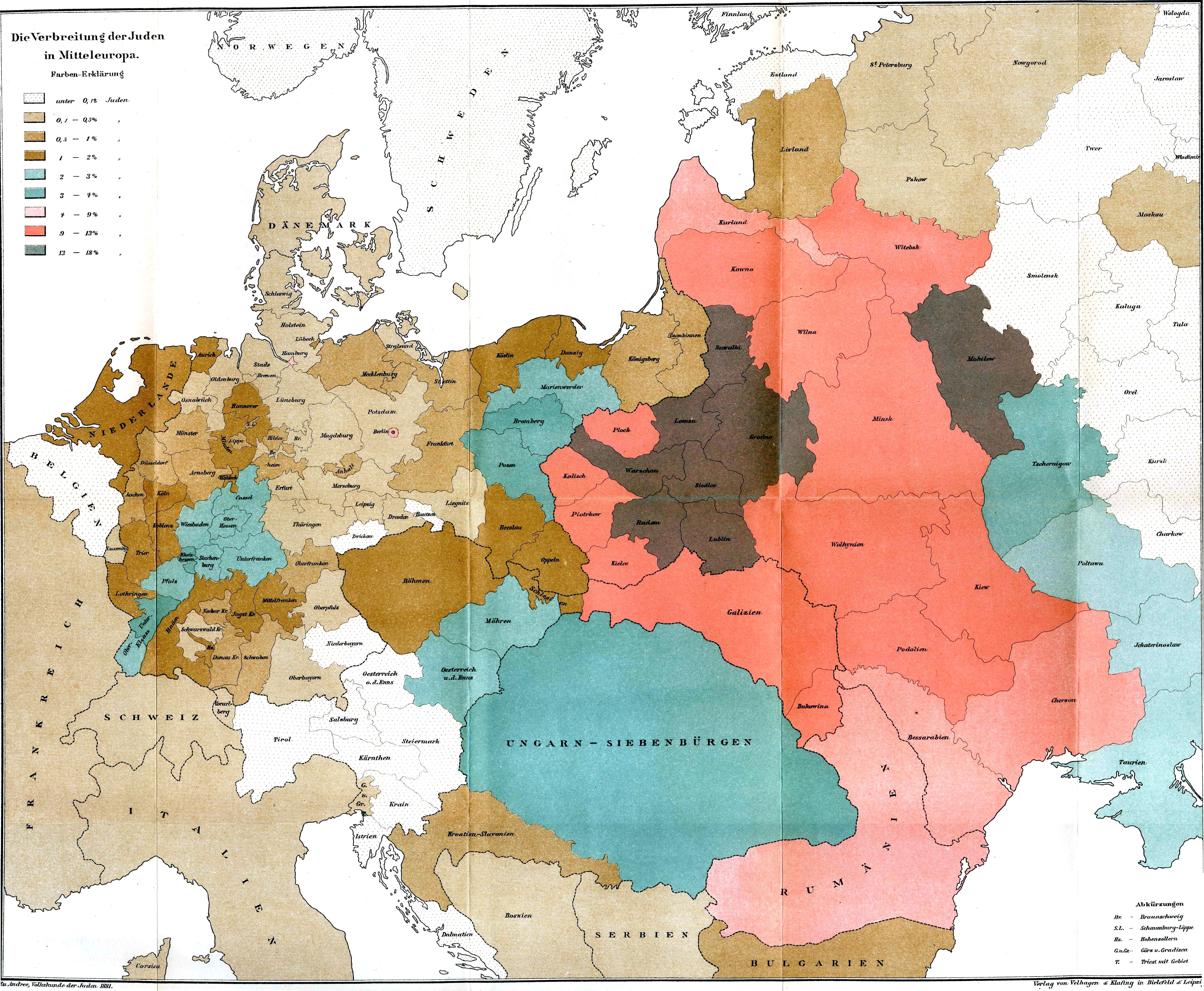
Juden 1881
