= Horn, Austria =

Horn
- Municipality
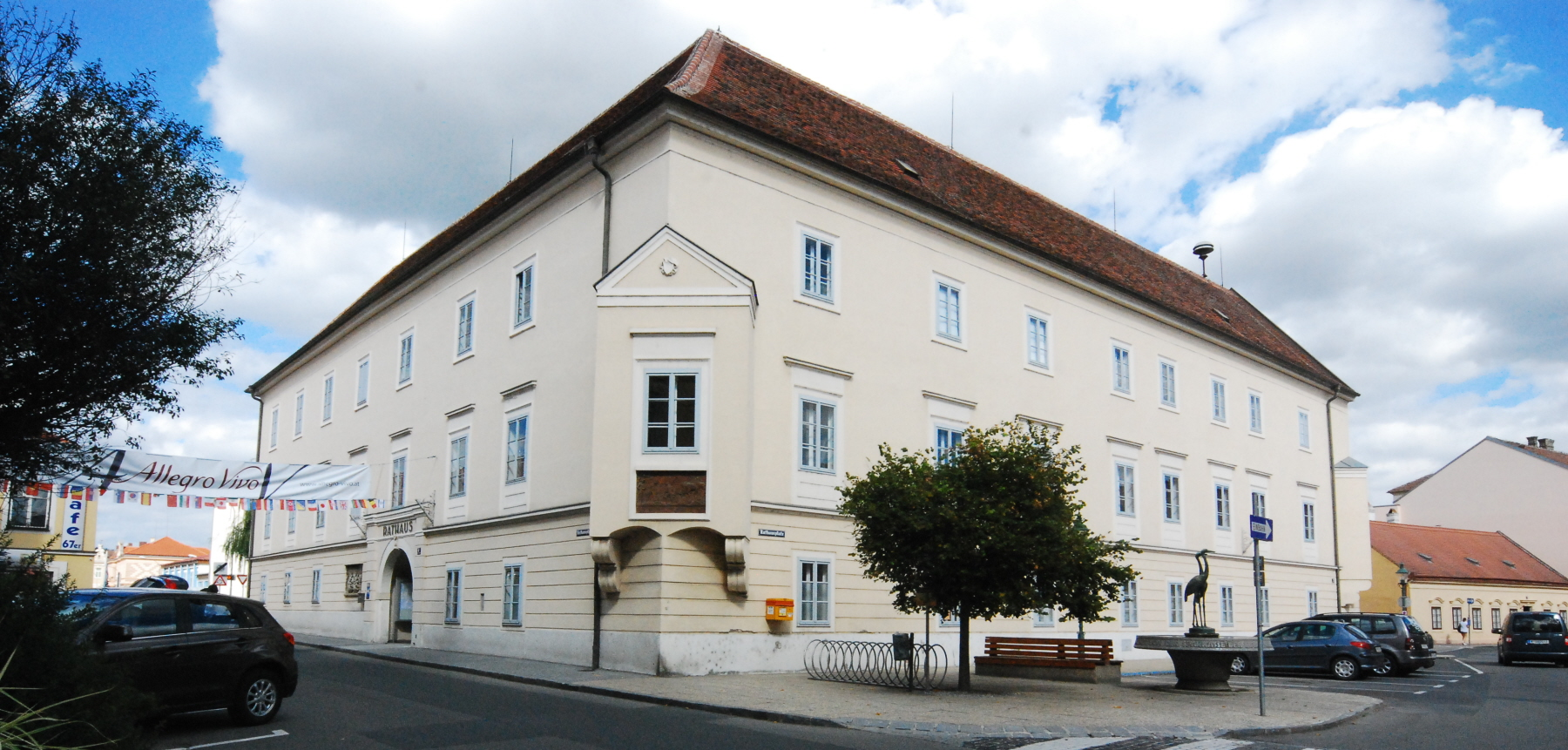
- Town hall

- Coat of arms

- Location within Austria
- Coordinates: 48°40′N 15°39′E
- Country: Austria
- State: Lower Austria
- District: Horn

Government
  - Mayor: Jürgen Maier (ÖVP)

Area
  - Total: 39.25 km^{2} (15.15 sq mi)
- Elevation: 311 m (1,020 ft)

Population (2018-01-01)
  - Total: 6,520
  - Density: 166/km^{2} (430/sq mi)
- Time zone: UTC+1 (CET)
  - Summer (DST): UTC+2 (CEST)
- Postal code: 3580
- Area code: 02982
- Website: horn.gv.at

Horn (Austrian German pronunciation: [hɔrn]) is a small town in the Waldviertel in Lower Austria, Austria and the capital of the district of the same name.

== Population ==
Historical population
Year	Pop.	±%
1860	2,975	—
1880	3,259	+9.5%
1890	3,669	+12.6%
1900	3,761	+2.5%
1910	4,189	+11.4%
1923	4,293	+2.5%
1934	4,503	+4.9%
1939	5,612	+24.6%
1951	5,340	−4.8%
1961	5,674	+6.3%
1971	6,265	+10.4%
1981	6,322	+0.9%
1991	6,364	+0.7%
2001	6,411	+0.7%
2011	6,535	+1.9%

== Notable people ==
- Marie Andree-Eysn (1847–1929), an Austrian botanist and folklorist.
- Moriz Winternitz (1863–1937), scholar, Orientalist and Indologist
- Stefan Michael Newerkla (born 1972), an Austrian linguist, Slavist and philologist.
- Nikolaus Newerkla (born 1974) an harpsichordist, arranger and conductor.
- Dominik Baumgartner (born 1996), an Austrian footballer who has played over 200 games
- Christoph Baumgartner (born 1999), an Austrian footballer who has played 234 games in senior competitions and 58 for Austria

== Sport ==
2008 Austrian Cup winner SV Horn is the local football club.
