= Marie Andree-Eysn =

Austrian botanist

- Born: Marie Eysn; 11 November 1847; Horn, Austria
- Died: 13 January 1929 (aged 81); Berchtesgaden, Germany
- Occupations: Botanist and Folklorist
- Spouse: Richard Andree (1835-1912)

Marie Andree-Eysn (b. 11 November 1847 Horn, Austria, d. 13 January 1929 Berchtesgaden, Germany) was an Austrian botanist and folklorist. She was a mentor to folklorist and politician Rudolf Kriss.

== Life ==
Marie Eysn was born in 1847 in Horn, Lower Austria, to the wealthy merchant Alois Eysn and his wife Anna Eysn. Her mother was a daughter of canvas dealer Florian Pollack and Margareta Bunzender from Linz. By 1860, the family had moved to Salzburg. Marie Eysn received private lessons and was also self-taught, especially in the field of botany. Here she was influenced by friendly relations with the family of the botanist Anton Kerner von Marilaun. In the area surrounding Salzburg, she collected alpine plants and created a phanerogames herbarium. From 1887 to 1891, she supported Kerner von Marilaun in his work “Schedae ad floram exsiccatam Austro-Hungaricam” for which she provided more than 1,200 documents. She donated a collection of algae to the Salzburg Natural History Museum. In addition to the natural sciences, she was also interested in textiles and collected an important collection of lace. Another area of interest for Eysn was history, for example she was involved in the research of the archaeologist Matthäus Much on Lake Mondsee in Upper Austria.

In 1903, at the age of 56, Eysn married the geographer and ethnographer Richard Andree (with whom she lived in Munich until his death 22 February 1912.) In the same year, she converted from Roman Catholic to Protestant and changed the direction of her research, which now concentrated on evidence of popular piety. She collected votive and amulets and supported her husband in his writing titled "Votive and Ordinations of the Catholic People in Southern Germany" (1904). She conducted extensive ethnological studies and published her main work “Folklore from the Bavarian-Austrian Alpine Region” in 1910, which formed the basis for her recognition as the "founder of pilgrimage research." In that year, she bequeathed a large part of the associated votive collection to the Berlin Folklore Museum (at that time it was the "Royal Collection for German Folklore in Berlin"). She was named an honorary member of the Museum Association in 1907.

After World War I ended, Andree-Eysn became destitute for the first time as a result of inflation. To make a living, she sold parts of her collections to museums. Rupprecht, Crown Prince of Bavaria provided her with an apartment in the Villa Brandholzlehen in Berchtesgaden, Germany where she spent her retirement.

In collaboration with her pupil and successor, the folklorist Rudolf Kriss, the basis for a religious folklore collection was created during this period, which later went to the Bavarian National Museum.

In 1920, Andree-Eysn became an honorary member of the Folklore Association appointed in Vienna. She died in Berchtesgaden in 1929 at the age of 81, and was buried in her parents' grave in the Salzburg city cemetery after an evangelical cremation in Munich.

== Works ==
- 1897 - Ueber alte Steinkreuze und Kreuzsteine in der Umgebung Salzburgs. in: Zeitschrift für österreichische Volkskunde, Bd.3, S.65-79
- 1898 - Hag und Zaun im Herzogthum Salzburg. in: Zeitschrift für österreichische Volkskunde, Bd.4, S.273-283
- 1898 - Botanisches zur Volkskunde. in: Zeitschrift des Vereins für Volkskunde, Bd.8, S.226f
- 1904 - Andree, Richard - Votive und Weihegaben des katholischen Volks in Süddeutschland. Ein Beitrag zur Volkskunde.
- 1910 - Volkskundliches. Aus dem bayrisch-österreichischen Alpengebiet
- 1915 - Der Birnbaum auf dem Walserfelde, in: Bayerische Hefte für Volkskunde, Heft 4, S.13ff
