= Andrees Allgemeiner Handatlas =

German general atlas

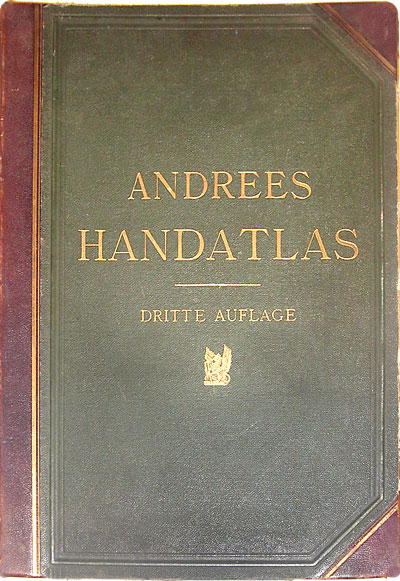
- Cover of the third edition of 1896.
- Author: Richard Andree
- Language: German
- Genre: Cartographic
- Publisher: Velhagen & Klasing
- Publication date: 1881
- Publication place: German Empire
- Media type: Book

Andrees Allgemeiner Handatlas was a major cartographic work (general atlas) published in several German and foreign editions 1881–1937. It was named after Richard Andree (1835–1912) and published by Velhagen & Klasing, Bielefeld and Leipzig, Germany.

By using chromolithography, rather than copper plate engraving, but reproducing the maps from zinc plates that were etched in relief (just like letterpress printing), V & K was able to offer detailed maps at a much lower price than competing works, such as the 7th and 8th editions of Stielers Handatlas. The 1937 edition of Andrees Handatlas was printed using offset printing.

== Editions ==
The first edition appeared in 1881. The 4th and 5th editions were edited by Carl Paul Albert (1851-1912); the 6th through 8th editions, by Ernst Ambrosius; and the final edition, by Konrad Frenzel. Cartographers were G. Jungk (†1932), R. Kocher, E. Umbreit (†1904), T. Adolph (†1930), H. Mielisch (†1925), and K. Tänzler (†1944) although production of a number of maps was contracted out to geographical institutes like Peip, Wagner & Debes, Sternkopf, Sulzer.

Editions of Andrees Allgemeiner Handatlas
Date	Edition	Edition	Main Maps	Side Maps	Names	Revisions, Notes
1881	[1st]	-	86	-	-	-
1887	2nd	Zweite	120 + 2	-	-	1889, 1890
1887	-	Supplement	33	-	-	For owners of the 1st edition.
1893	3rd	Dritte	91	86	-	1896
1893	-	Supplement	64	-	-	For owners of the 1st and 2nd editions.
1899	4th	Vierte	126	137	-	1900, 1901, 1903, 1904
1899	-	Supplement	53	-	-	For owners of the 2nd and 3rd editions.
1906	5th	Fünfte^{1}	139	161	-	1907, 1908, 1909, 1910, 1911, 1912, 1913
1914	6th	Sechste^{2}	221	192	-	-
1921	7th	Siebente^{2}	228	215	-	1921
1922	8th	Achte^{2}	228	198	-	1924, 1924, 1928
1922	-	Ergänzungsband	62	-	-	Supplement, for earlier editions.
1930	8th	Achte^{2}	231	211	300,000	5th revision
1937	[9th]	Ausgewählte^{3}	100	-	-	-
^{1}Jubiläumsausgabe (jubilee, or anniversary, edition).^{2}Namenverzeichnis (names index) in a separate volume.^{3}Selected, or concise, edition, in one volume.

Editions for other countries were also issued:

- Österreichisch-Ungarischer (Austrian-Hungarian) editions were published in Vienna in 1881, 1889, 1893, 1903, and 1913.
- Four editions of Andree's Stora Handatlas were published in Stockholm (1881, 96 pages of maps; 1899, second edition (andra), 130 large maps and 140 inset maps; 1907, third edition (tredje), 143 large maps and 163 inset maps), with additional maps of Scandinavia; and 1924. The verso text and the introductory material was in Swedish.
- The maps of Andree's atlas were used for Cassell's Universal Atlas, which was published in London in 1891-1893 using maps printed in Leipzig in English; and for the Times Atlas of 1895-1900.
- French editions were published from 1882 onwards.
- Italian editions were published in 1899 and 1915.
- Danish editions were published in 1882 and, after the Schleswig plebiscite, 1923.
- Norwegian editions were published in 1882 and 1923.
- A Finnish edition was published in 1899.

Editions of a Geographisches Handbuch (Geographical Handbook) for Andrees Handatlas were issued in 1882, 1894 (1st edition), 1895 (2nd edition), 1898-1899 (3rd), 1902 (4th) and 1909 (5th).

Other well-known titles of Velhagen & Klasing were Putzgers (after F.W. Putzger, †1913) Historischer Schulatlas (Historical School Atlas; 1877, as Historischer Weltatlas or Historical Worldatlas; 100th ed. 1979), Grosser Volksatlas (Large Peoples Atlas, 1935) and Grosser Wehratlas (Large Military Atlas, 1937). Founded 1835, the firm was taken over by F. Cornelsen in 1954, and is now fully merged into that company.
