= Tarnovsky =

Tarnovsky or Tarnovski (feminine: Tarnovskaya) Russian: Тарновский, Тарновская (occasionally also transliterated in other languages as Tarnowsky or Tarnovschi) is a Russified form of the Polish noble family name Tarnowski and usually belongs to people of Polish or Ukrainian ancestry. It ultimately derives from the name of the city of Tarnów.

Tarnovski (Bulgarian: Търновски) is also a Bulgarian appellation and family name derived from the city of Tarnovo.

The surname may refer to the following notable people:

- Christopher Tarnovsky (born 1971), American hacker
- Evtimiy Tarnovski, Evtimiy of Tarnovo (14th century), last head of the Bulgarian Orthodox Church
- Kliment Tarnovski (c.1841-1901), Prime Minister of Bulgaria
- Konstantin Tarnovsky (1826–1892) Russian playwright
- Martin Turnovský (1928–2021), Czech conductor
- Oleg Tarnovschi (born 1992), Moldovan sprint canoeist
- Serghei Tarnovschi (born 1997), Moldovan sprint canoeist, brother of Oleg
- Sergei Tarnowsky (Russian: Сергей Тарновский; 1882–1976), Russian-American pianist
- Teodosiy Tarnovski, Theodosius of Tarnovo (14th century), Bulgarian cleric
