= Karl Andree =

German geographer (1808–1875)

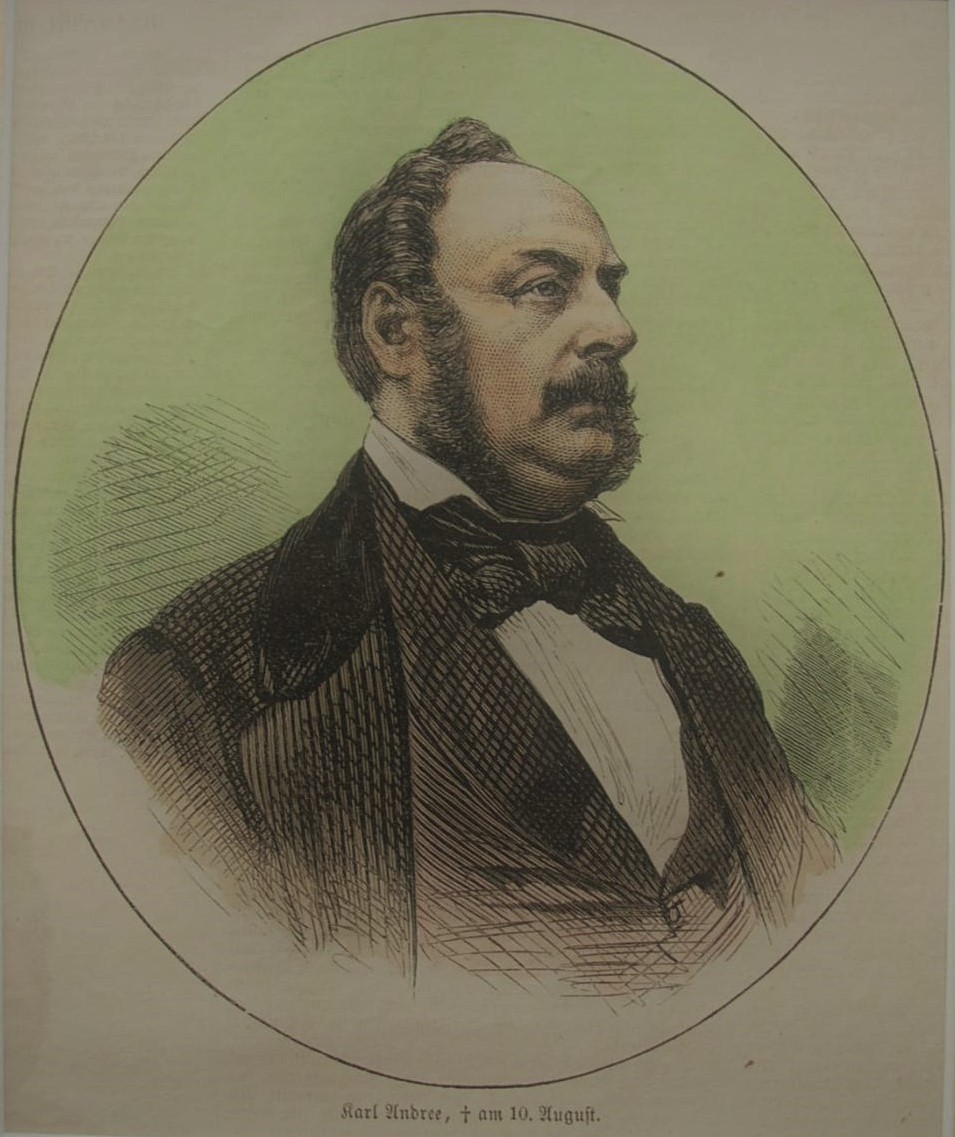
- Born: October 20, 1808; Braunschweig, Germany
- Died: August 10, 1875 (aged 66); Bad Wildungen, Germany
- Spouse: Adelheid Andree
- Children: Richard Andree

Karl Andree (20 October 1808 – 10 August 1875) was a German geographer, publicist and consul.

== Biography ==
Andree was born in Braunschweig. He was educated at Jena, Göttingen, and Berlin in historical science. After having been implicated in a students' political agitation he became a journalist, and in 1851 founded the newspaper Bremer Handelsblatt. From 1855, however, he devoted himself entirely to geography and ethnography, working successively at Leipzig and at Dresden. During the American Civil War, he advocated the cause of the secessionists. In 1862 he founded the important geographical periodical Globus. He died at Wildungen. His son Richard Andree followed in his father's career.

== Works ==
His most famous works include North America in geographical and historical outline (Nordamerika in geographischen und geschichtlichen Umrissen) (Brunswick, 1854) or Buenos Aires and the Argentinian Republic (Buenos Ayres und die argentinische Republik) (Leipzig, 1856). In Geographic Migrations (Geographische Wanderungen) (Dresden, 1859), he put emphasis on ethnological moments and argued that ethnology should be considered a main foundational point of political science. He understood the term ethnology (German: Völkerkunde) to be defined as concerning racial anthropology and not as comparative cultural anthropology.

- Geographie des Welthandels (Stuttgart, 1867-1872)
