= Maria Tarnowska =

Russian noblewoman and murderer (1877–1949)

- Born: June 8, 1877; Poltava, Russian Empire
- Died: January 23, 1949 (aged 71); Santa Fe, Argentina
- Conviction: Murder of Pavel Kamarovsky
- Penalty: Murder

Countess Maria Tarnowska (or Tarnowskaya, Tarnovska, etc.; 9 June 1877, Poltava, Russian Empire – 23 January 1949, Santa Fe, Argentina), born Maria Nikolaevna O'Rourke (Russian phonetical transcription: Orurk), was a Russian convict. She was the daughter of Count Nikolay Moritsevitch O'Rourke ( 25 June 1834 - 31 January 1916, Kyiv ), a Russian naval officer of Irish ancestry and his second wife Ekaterina Seletska ( 4 August 1850 - 5 February 1905, Kyiv ) - a noblewoman of Cossack origin. She gained international notoriety by standing trial for plotting and instigating the murder of one of her lovers. Her 1910 trial in Venice and subsequent conviction attracted media attention from both sides of the Atlantic and became the subject of various books (Annie Chartres Vivanti, Hans Habe, etc.).

== Biography ==
After marrying the Russian aristocrat Wassily Tarnowski (1872–1932) at the age of seventeen and giving birth to a son, Wassily (born 1895), and a daughter, Tatyana (1898–1994), she became romantically involved with several other men. She was also known to abuse narcotic drugs (morphine).

In 1907 in Venice, one of Tarnowska's lovers, Nicholas Naumov (also spelled Naumoff), killed another one of her lovers, Count Pavel Kamarovsky, allegedly upon her instigation. The Countess Tarnowska, as she was commonly called, was arrested that same year in Vienna and transferred to La Giudecca penitentiary in Venice, where the trial was to be held.

The trial, locally called "the Russian affair" (il caso russo), began on 14 March 1910 and ended on 20 May of the same year, with the conviction of both defendants. Maria Tarnowska was found guilty, but was sentenced to serve a relatively mild term of only eight years in prison, thanks to an ingenious defence (it was one of the first to include Freudian analysis of the defendant's personality and motives) – and, possibly, due to the leniency of the presiding judge.

She was transferred to the penitentiary at Trani (southern Italy), and released in 1915.

Accounts of Tarnowska's life after her release are sketchy at best. She is known to have emigrated to America shortly after her release, in the company of a U.S. diplomat, under the assumed name of "Nicole Roush". In 1916 she was living in Buenos Aires with a new lover, the Frenchman Alfred de Villemer, and calling herself "Madame de Villemer". There are accounts of her running a store selling silk and other finery.

Alfred de Villemer died in 1940; Maria died on 23 January 1949. Her body was transported back to Ukraine (then the USSR), where she was laid to rest in her family tomb.

== Post mortem ==
Luchino Visconti worked on a treatment for a film to be called Il processo di Maria Tarkowska (The Trial of Maria Tarkowska), with Romy Schneider but it was never made. The filming was planned to begin in 1966 in Venice.

== Bibliography ==
- Andrea Accorsi & Massimo Centini (2005), I grandi delitti italiani risolti o irrisolti. Roma: New Compton Editori, ISBN 978-88-541-0414-3.
- La Domenica del Corriere, 13–20 March 1910.
- La Stampa, 4 September 1907.
- Stefan Michael Newerkla (2020), Das irische Geschlecht O'Reilly und seine Verbindungen zu Österreich und Russland [The Irish O'Reilly family and their connections to Austria and Russia]. In: Diachronie – Ethnos – Tradition: Studien zur slawischen Sprachgeschichte [Diachrony – Ethnos – Tradition: Studies in Slavic Language History]. Eds. Jasmina Grković-Major, Natalia B. Korina, Stefan M. Newerkla, Fedor B. Poljakov, Svetlana M. Tolstaja. Brno, Tribun EU, ISBN 978-80-263-1581-0, pp. 259–279 (accessible online), here chapter 3.2 The Competing Clan O'Rourke, pp. 263–265.
- Andrea Salmaso (2006), Maria Nikolajewna O'Rourke Tarnowska. “L’affare dei Russi”, Venezia (1907–2007). Venezia: Hotel Ala (accessible online)
- Annie Vivanti (2012), Circe. Il romanzo di Maria Tarnowska. Milano: Otto-Novecento Editore, ISBN 978-88-877-3436-2.
- Virginie Roels (4 avril 2024), Une femme de mauvaise vie, Editions Robert Laffont. ( Roman inspiré de la vie de Maria Tarnowska).

https://www.lisez.com/livre-grand-format/une-femme-de-mauvaise-vie/9782221267592
