= Manevychi =

Rural locality in Volyn Oblast, Ukraine

Manevychi Маневичі
- Rural settlement
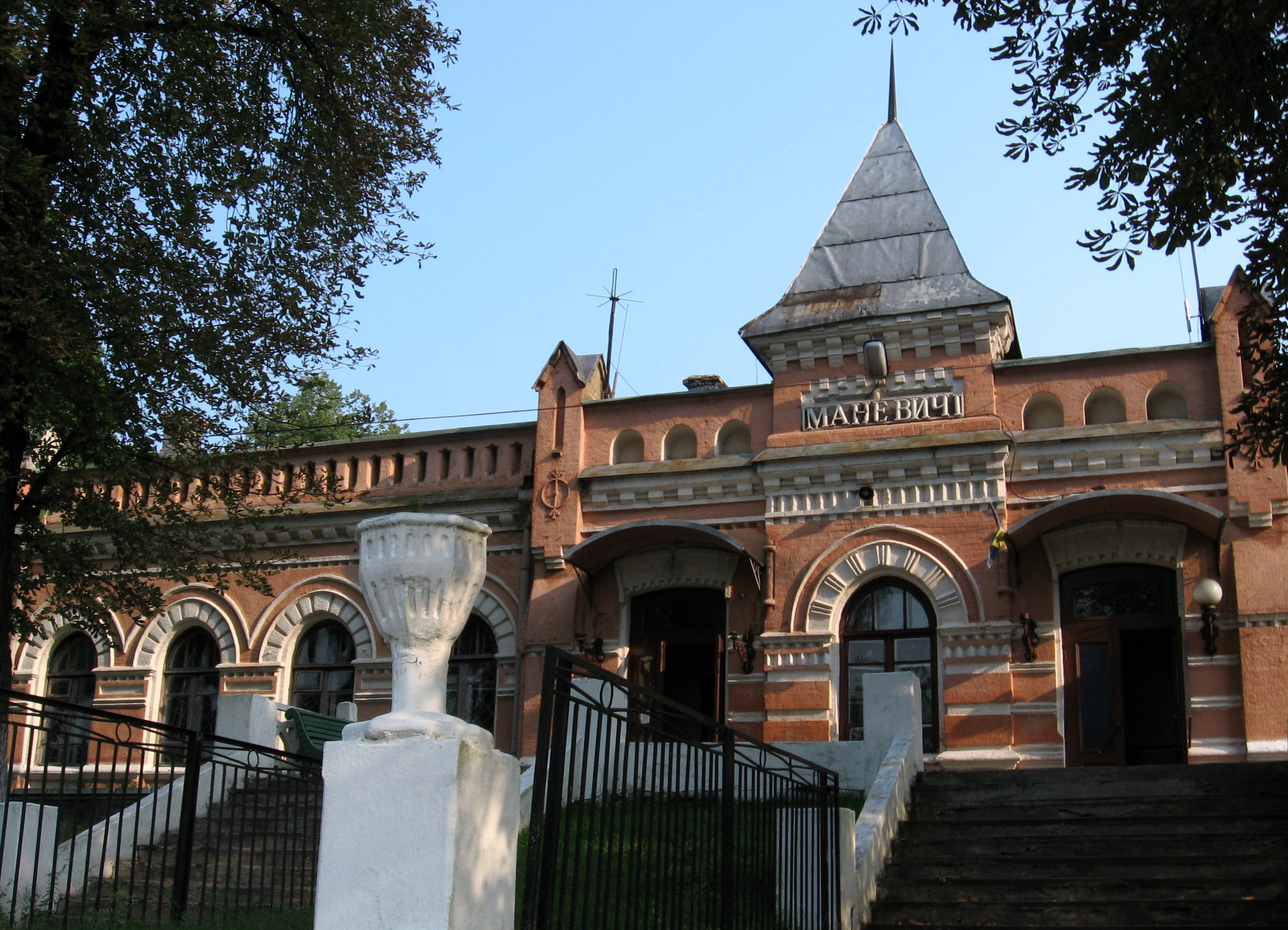
- Manevychi railway station

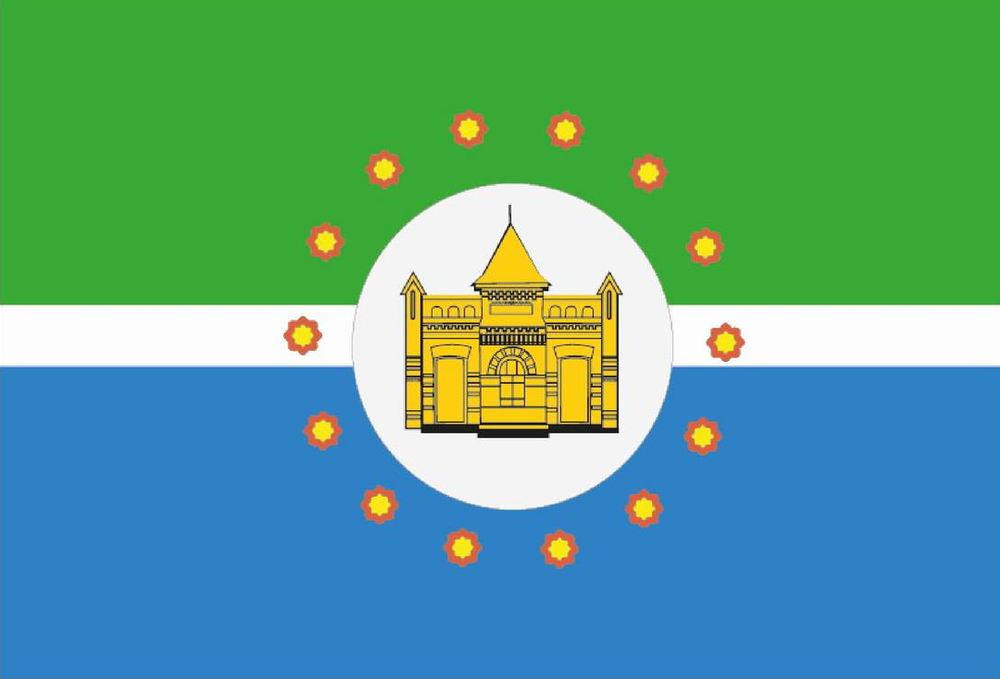
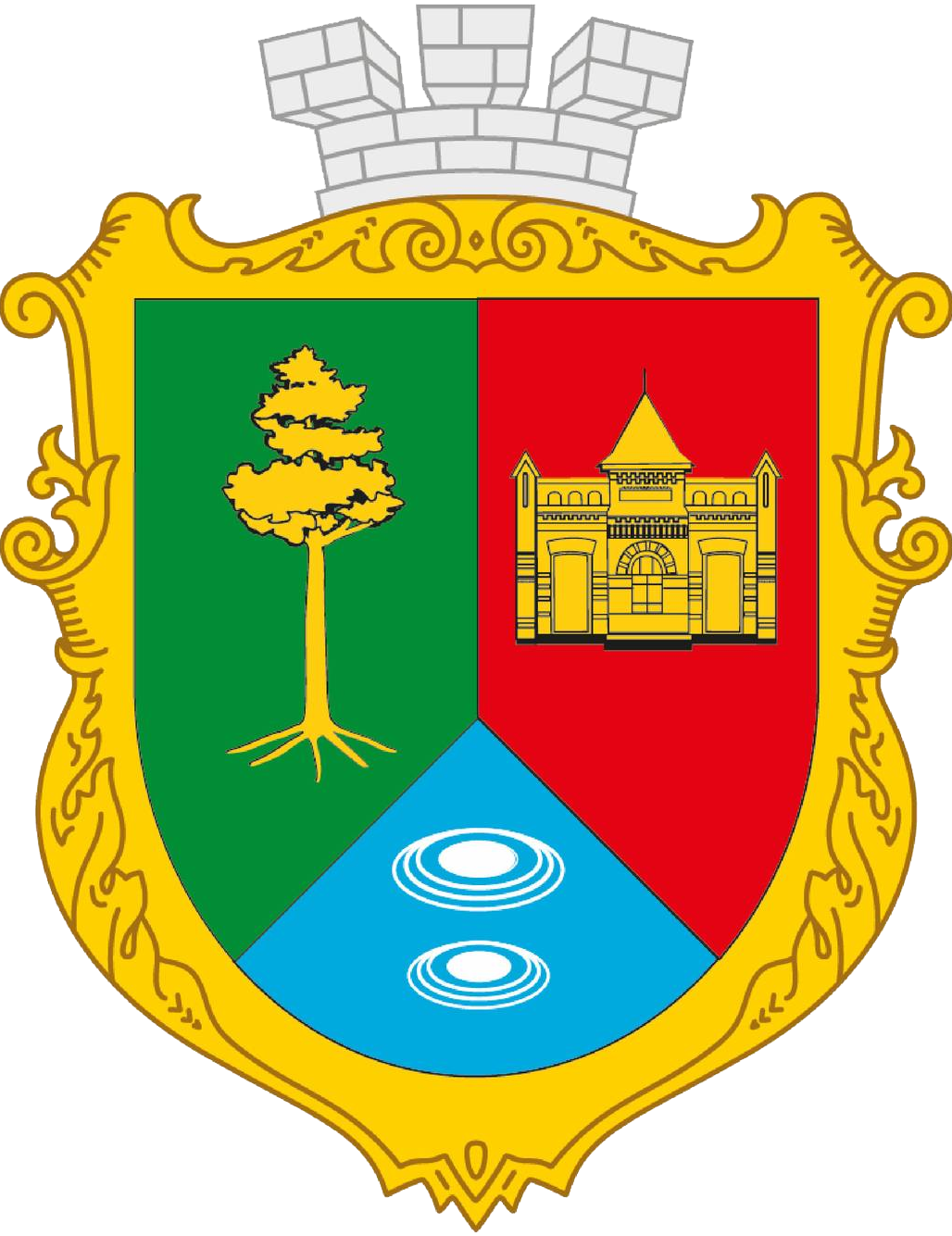
- Flag Coat of arms

- Location in Volyn Oblast Location in Ukraine
- Coordinates: 51°17′29″N 25°31′59″E
- Country: Ukraine
- Oblast: Volyn Oblast
- Raion: Kamin-Kashyrskyi Raion
- Hromada: Manevychi settlement hromada

Population (2022)
  - Total: 11,725
- Time zone: UTC+2 (EET)
  - Summer (DST): UTC+3 (EEST)

Manevychi (Ukrainian: Маневичі; Polish: Maniewicze; German: Manewytschi; Yiddish: מנייביץ) is a rural settlement in Kamin-Kashyrskyi Raion, Volyn Oblast, western Ukraine. It was the administrative center of Manevychi Raion until the raion was abolished in 2020. Population: 11,725 (2022 estimate).

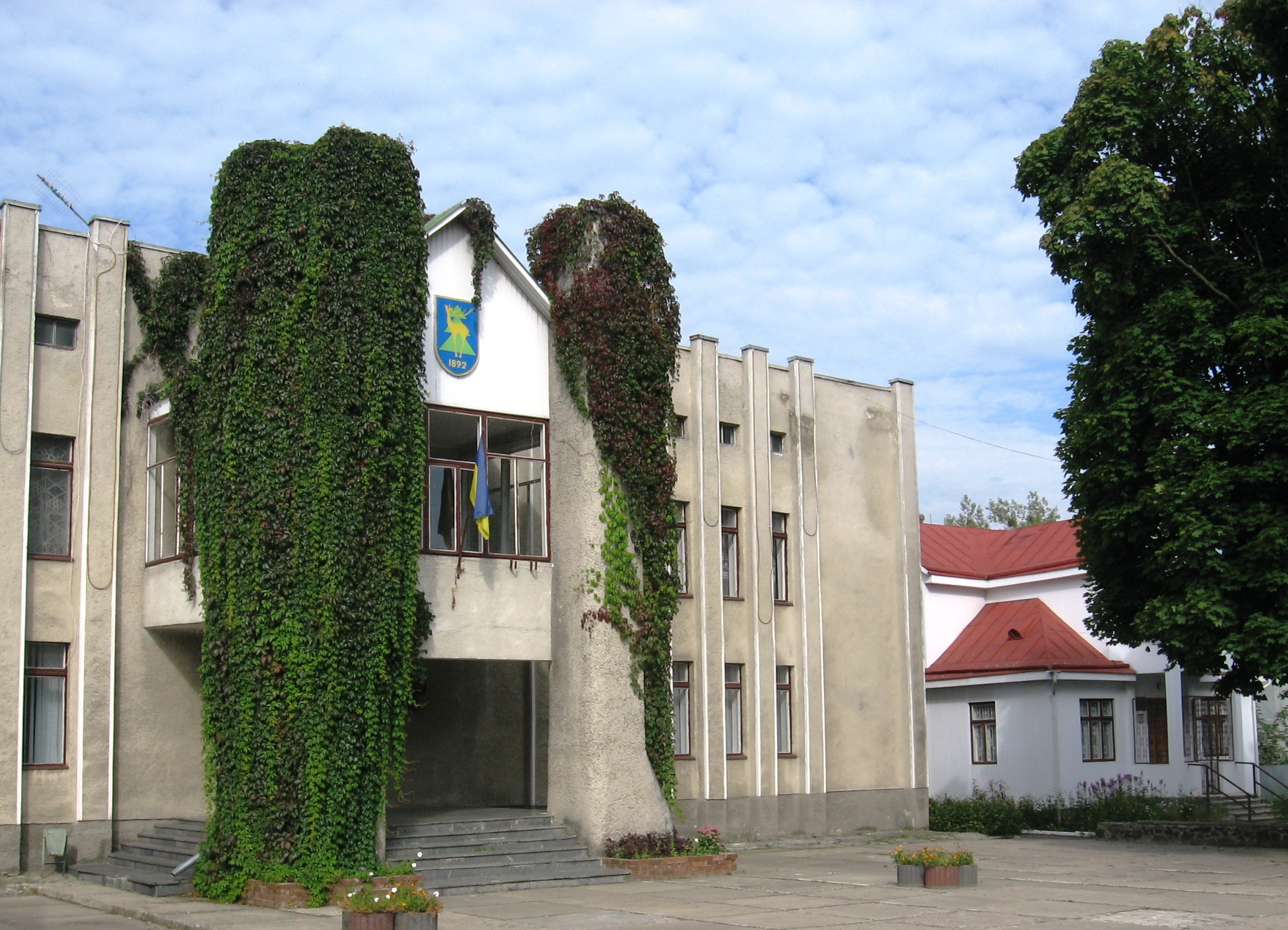
Manevychi town hall

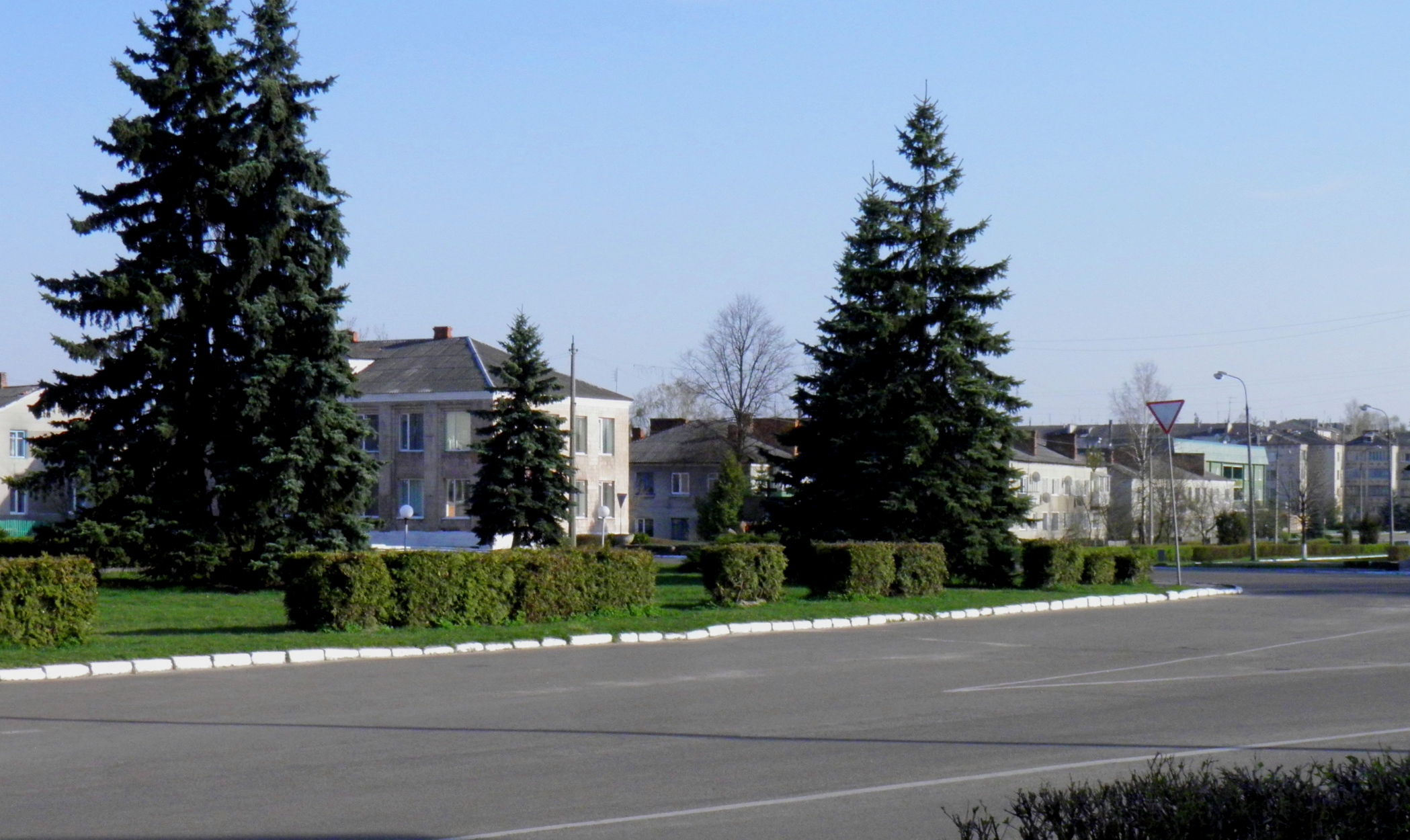
Town centre

== History ==
The town originated from a railway station during the Kovel-Sarny railway construction in 1892. In 30 years of the twentieth century it grew rapidly due to the industrial development. In particular, this was based on a Belgian manufacturer of parquet factories Lachappelle. There were bakeries and small meat-processing plants, owned by Klimczuk family. There was also a small sawmill.

The town was predominantly inhabited by Jews (approx. 50%) and Poles (approx. 30%). There were also Ukrainians, Germans and several families from Bessarabia.

Almost the whole Jewish population of Manevychi was killed in 1942 during the World War II. The Manevychi Holocaust Jewish memorial is located on the western outskirts of the town towards the village of Cherevakha. The Polish population was partly exterminated and deported by the Communists in 1939–41. Most Poles left the town after the war. Manevychi is mentioned in the Kresy book of the fair on the pages 53 and 58.

Until 26 January 2024, Manevychi was designated urban-type settlement. On this day, a new law entered into force which abolished this status, and Manevychi became a rural settlement.

== Attractions ==
Railway Station (1905), Roman Catholic Church of the Holy Spirit (1934) Near Manevychi (at the highway Manevychi-Lutsk) there is a unique hydrological monument, the Okonski Spring, known for its unique clean water with a special chemical composition. There is also a monument to the bee, which was entered in the book of records of Ukraine as the largest monument to this insect in Ukraine.

== Roman Catholic Church of the Holy Spirit ==
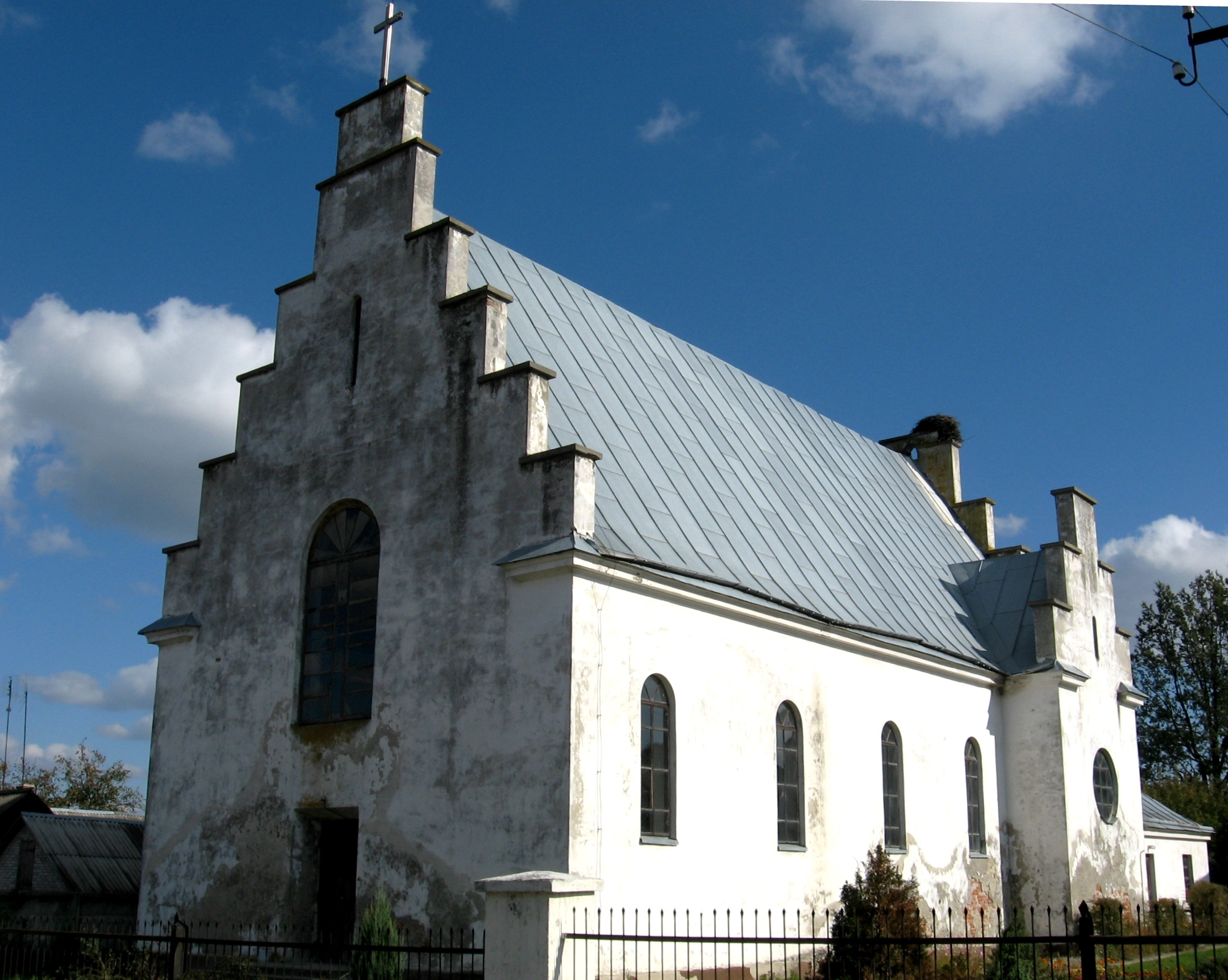
Roman Catholic church in Manevychi

Roman Catholic Parish of the Holy Spirit in Manevychi was formed in 1923. A wooden chapel served as Parish church that was built near the railroad in 1915 as a military chapel. In 1922–1926, its construction was completed. A new stone church was built in 1933–1937 at the expense of the churchgoers. The construction work was conducted by priest Boleslaw Jastrzebski (b. 1893, vysv. 1925, died. 1942). By the end of 1943 the church was operated newly arrived priest Edmund Domanski. After World War II the Soviet authorities closed the church, storing mineral salts in it. The salt, kept there for 40 years, led to inevitable destruction. The first Holy Mass in many years was held in 1990 on the steps of the ruined church by Jan Mucharski OFMCap. The church was returned to the faithful in 1992 after he rebuilt and restored it. Bishop Markijan Trofimiak, auxiliary Bishop of Lviv Archdiocese at that time, re-consecrated the church in Manevychi on June 4, 1995. Through the efforts of priest pralata Ludwik Kamilewski of Lutsk was built plebaniya. In 1992-1994 there was a prior bhp. Adam Galek, and in the years 1994-2001 hp. Kazimierz Boleslaw Zajac. In November 2001, the rector of the parish in Manevichi and Lubeshiv is cop. Andrzej Maciej Kwiczala.

== Football club Legia Warsaw ==
In March 1916 the Polish Legion soldiers, which were stationed in the forests under the village, created the first football team in the Polish Army, giving it the name "Legion's Team" (Drużyna Legionowa). In autumn of 1916 it was transferred to Warsaw. On 31 July 1922, the team was reorganized as Legia Warsaw. Legia Warsaw is one of the best clubs in the history of the Polish football.

== Economy ==
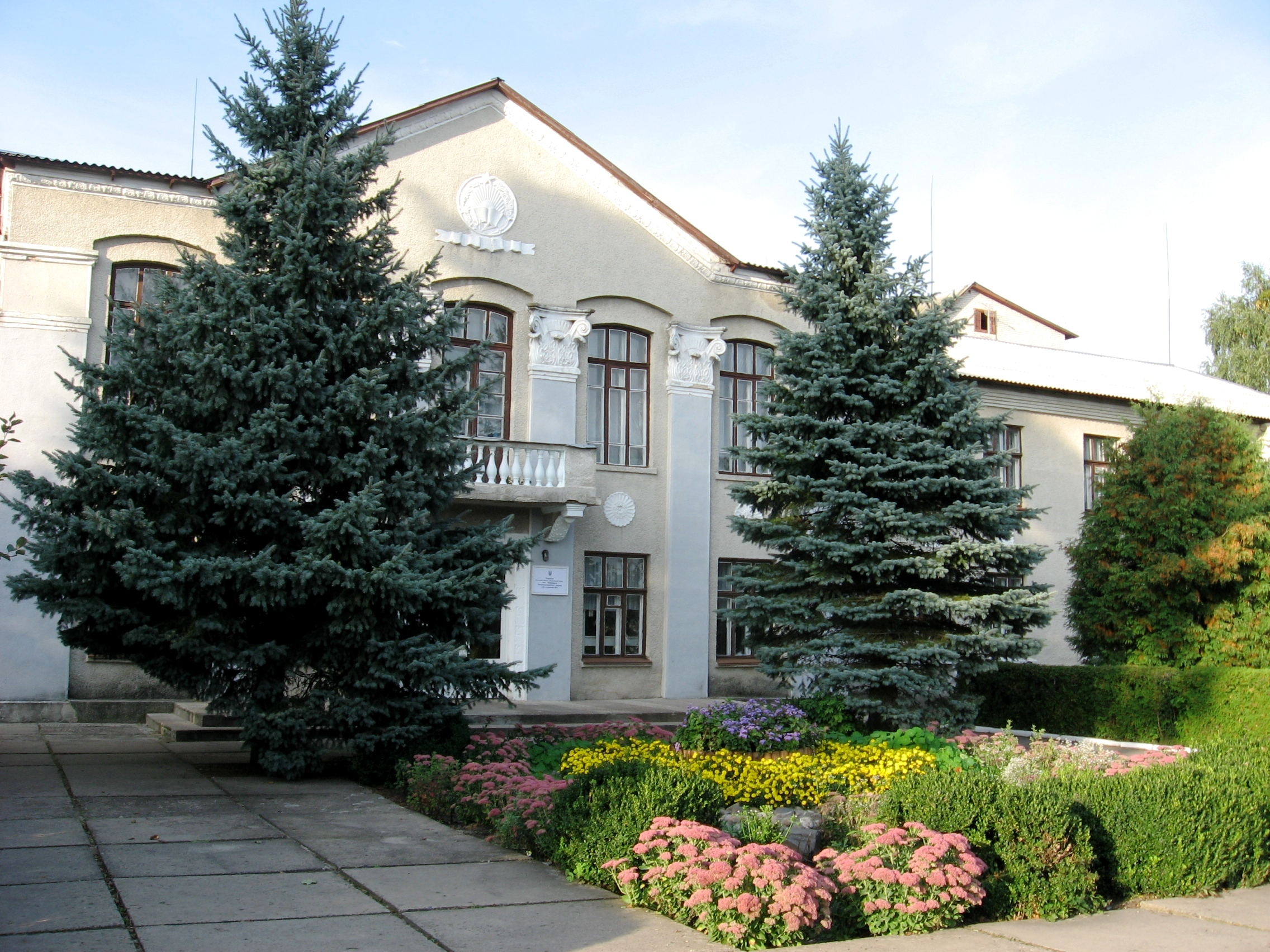
School No.1 in Manevychi

In Manevychi there are a bricks plant, a state woodworking enterprise, and a private sawmill. There is a Ukrainian-Polish joint venture engaged in mushrooms and berries harvesting and exporting them to EU countries. Economic relations with Poland are being developed.

== Population ==
According to the 2022 estimate, Manevychi's population is 11,725 people.

The vast majority of the population are Ukrainians; the number of other nationalities is small.

As for the language of the population, the majority of the population according to the National Census of 2001 consider the Ukrainian language as their native language.

== Notable people ==
- Josef Tarnowski (1922-2010), an intelligence officer for the Armia Krajowa after the Soviet Union invaded eastern Poland (now western Ukraine)

== See also ==
- Polish–Soviet War
