= Manevychi Raion =

Former subdivision of Volyn Oblast, Ukraine

Manevychi Raion Маневицький район
- Raion
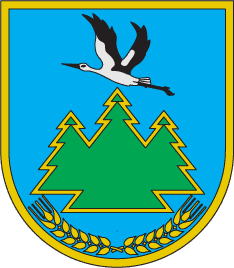
- Flag Coat of arms

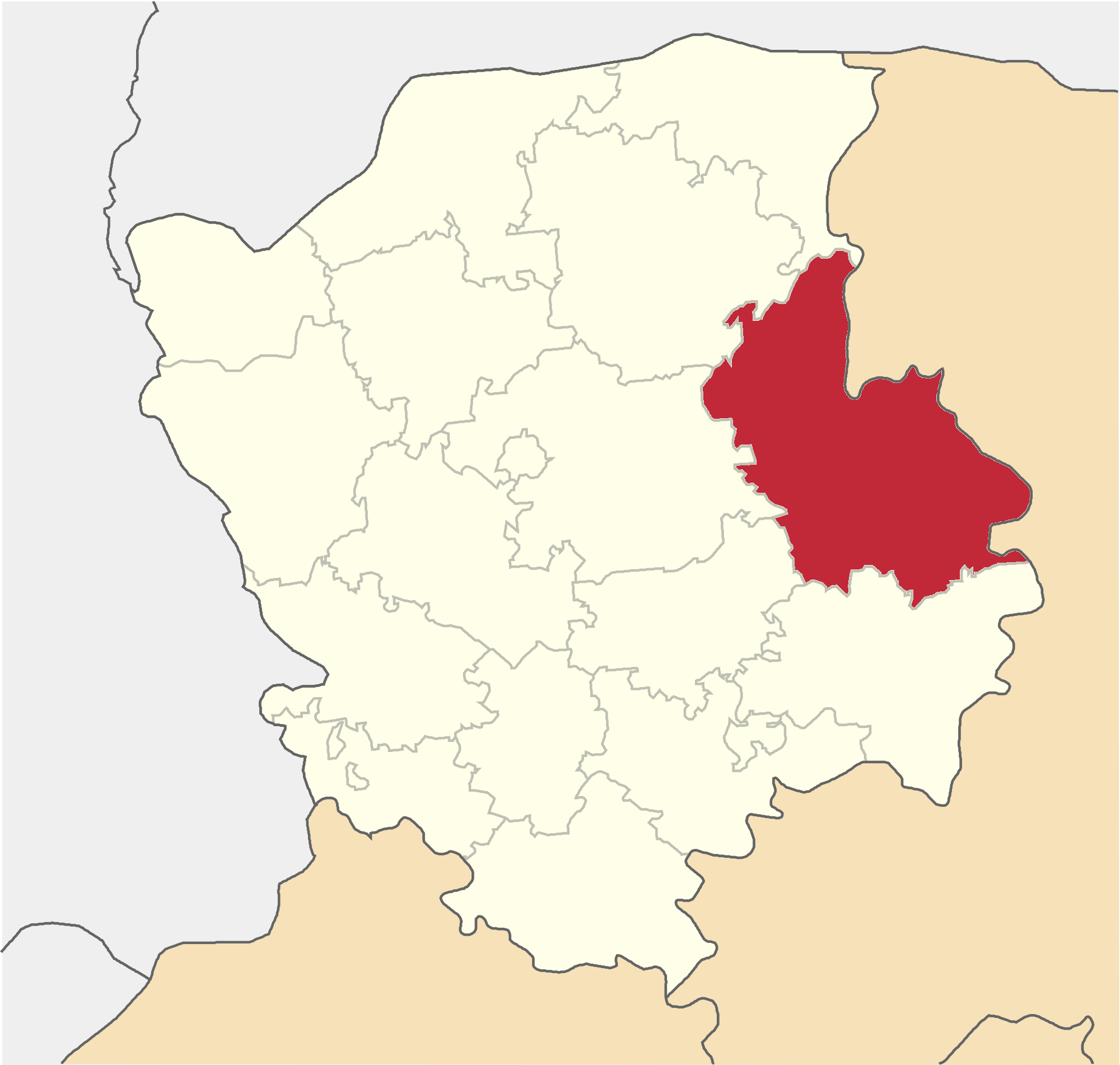
- Coordinates: 51°18′00″N 25°30′00″E
- Country: Ukraine
- Oblast: Volyn Oblast
- Established: 1965
- Disestablished: 18 July 2020
- Admin. center: Manevychi
- Subdivisions: List: — city councils; — settlement councils; — rural councils; Number of localities: — cities; — urban-type settlements; 96 — villages; — rural settlements

Area
  - Total: 2,265 km^{2} (875 sq mi)

Population (2020)
  - Total: 53,481
  - Density: 23.61/km^{2} (61.15/sq mi)
- Time zone: UTC+02:00 (EET)
  - Summer (DST): UTC+03:00 (EEST)
- Postal index: 44600-44682
- Area code: 380-3376
- Website: http://manadm.gov.ua/ Manevytskyi Raion

Manevychi Raion (Ukrainian: Маневицький район) was a raion in Volyn Oblast in western Ukraine. Its administrative center was the urban-type settlement of Manevychi. The raion was abolished and its territory was merged into Kamin-Kashyrskyi Raion on 18 July 2020 as part of the administrative reform of Ukraine, which reduced the number of raions of Volyn Oblast to four. The last estimate of the raion population was 53,481 (2020 est.)

== Notable residents ==
- Zygmunt Sierakowski (1826, Lisów – 1863) was one of the leaders of the January Uprising in lands of the former Grand Duchy of Lithuania in the Polish–Lithuanian Commonwealth

== See also ==
- Administrative divisions of Volyn Oblast
