= Stefan Michael Newerkla =

Austrian linguist (born 1972)

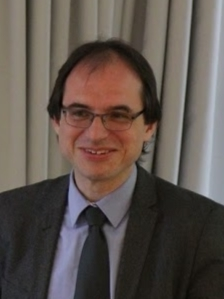
- Born: October 7, 1972 (age 54); Horn, Lower Austria, Austria
- Occupations: professor of West Slavic linguistics (since 2004)
- Known for: Historical sociolinguistics, Contact linguistics
- Spouse: Lenka Newerkla (m. 1993)
- Children: 3

Academic background
- Education: University of Vienna, Mag. (1996), Dr. phil. (1998), Univ.-Doz. (2003)

Academic work
- Discipline: Linguist, Slavist
- Institutions: University of Vienna

Notes
- S M Newerkla's Curriculum vitae S M Newerkla's Full publication list

Stefan Michael Newerkla (/ˈnəvərklɒ/; born October 7, 1972) is an Austrian linguist, Slavist and philologist. He has taught as Professor of West Slavic Linguistics at the University of Vienna since 2004 and has been Full Member (Fellow) of the Austrian Academy of Sciences since 2018.

== Biography ==
Born in Horn, Lower Austria, Newerkla majored in Slavonic Studies as well as English and American Studies at Vienna University (1996). He took his PhD (1998) at this very university with his doctoral thesis on diglossia in the school system of the Czech-speaking crown lands of the Habsburg Empire (1740–1918) featuring the West Bohemian district town of Plzeň. From 2000 to 2003 he was employed in a research project of the Austrian Science Fund (FWF) on linguistic contacts between Czech, Slovak and German, which he completed with his postdoctoral thesis (habilitation) on German loanwords in Czech and Slovak, highlighting their historical development, giving their first evidence in literature and presenting previous and new etymologies for them. Newerkla was appointed Professor of West Slavic Linguistics at the Alma Mater Rudolphina Vindobonensis in 2004.

He is married to Lenka Newerkla, a senior lecturer of Czech at the University of Salzburg. Together, they have three children. His brother Nikolaus Newerkla is the conductor of the award-winning ensemble Quadriga Consort.

== Work ==
Newerkla's research interests include German-Slavic language contact, Central Europe as a linguistic area, language legislation, schooling and language education in the Habsburg Empire, and Vienna's contributions to Czech and Slovak National Renaissance. Moreover, he is co-author of textbooks and exercise books for Czech and Slovak language classes. Newerkla publishes several book series, and – together with Fedor Poljakov – the international journal Vienna Slavic Yearbook (Harrassowitz publishing house).

Currently, Newerkla is working mainly on two research areas supported by the Austrian Science Fund (FWF) – on the project "German and Slavic languages in Austria: aspects of language contact", which is part of the Special Research Programme (SFB) "German in Austria. Variation – Contact – Perception", and together with Roman Krivko and Fedor Poljakov on the international joint project "Slavic studies in exchange: Austria and Russia in 1849–1939".

Together with Alexandra N. Lenz, Newerkla also contributes to the thematic platform on multilingualism of the Austrian Academy of Sciences (ÖAW) with the project "Aspects of Multilingualism in Austria: Competence – Usage – Attitudes". Moreover, he is founding member of the "Research Platform for the Study of Transformations and Eastern Europe".

== Honors ==
Newerkla has been elected Member of the Academic Assembly of the Czech Academy of Sciences since 2010 and of its Science Council since 2013.

In 2017, he was awarded the Josef Dobrovský Honorary Medal for Merit in the Philological and Philosophical Sciences of the Czech Academy of Sciences.

In 2018, Newerkla was elected Full Member (Fellow) of the Division of Humanities and the Social Sciences of the Austrian Academy of Sciences. Since 2022 he is also elected Member of the Academy Council of the Austrian Academy of Sciences.

In 2023 he received the Premia Bohemica for his outstanding contribution to the promotion of Czech literature abroad.

In 2024, Newerkla was awarded the Distinguished Contribution to Diplomacy Medal by the Czech Minister of Foreign Affairs Jan Lipavský and was ceremoniously presented with it by Ambassador Jiří Šitler on January 29, 2025 at a ceremony in the Hall of Mirrors of the Czech Embassy in Vienna. On 12 November 2025, he received the medal once again in his capacity as co-chair of the Permanent Conference of Czech and Austrian Historians on Common Cultural Heritage.

On 30 November 2024, in the King John III Sobieski Hall of the Scientific Centre of the Polish Academy of Sciences (PAN) in Vienna-Landstraße, Newerkla was awarded the jubilee badge commemorating the 130th anniversary of the Association of Poles in Austria ‘Strzecha’.

On 9 October 2025, Newerkla was awarded the highest award given by the Czech Academy of Sciences for contributions to science and humanistic ideas, the Honorary Medal 'De scientia et humanitate optime meritis'.
