= Joe Tarnowski =

Josef "Joe" Tarnowski (19 March 1922, in Maniewicze – 12 September 2010, in Edinburgh) was a Polish-Scottish electronics engineer and intelligence officer. He was a spy for the Armia Krajowa after the Soviet Union invaded eastern Poland (now western Ukraine) under the terms of the Nazi-Soviet Pact, before being arrested by the NKVD, tortured, and sentenced to the Vorkuta gulag in Siberia. His transportation orders were signed by Nikita Khrushchev.

Reprieved when Hitler's attack caused the USSR to change sides, Tarnowski made his way to Iran, there joining the Polish Paratroop Brigade. Shipped to Perthshire for training in Fife, he was to meet his future wife Janet in 1944 before the brigade dropped on Arnhem.

Postwar, he trained as an electronic engineer. He became a British citizen and found work in West Germany with International Telephone and Telegraph.

In retirement, he volunteered with British Executive Service Overseas in post-communist Poland to help rebuild an economy there and trade with Britain. For this work he in 1999 received the Silver Polish Order of Merit, in 2000 was made a Member of the Order of the British Empire, and in 2006 was promoted Officer of the Order of Merit of the Republic of Poland.

== Work ==
- Tarnowski, Josef; Raszkowski Ross, Raymond (2009). Walking with Shadows. Glen Murray Publishing. ISBN 978-0-9561758-0-9.
