= Quadriga Consort =

Austrian early music ensemble

Quadriga Consort aka Quadriga Early Music Band is an early music ensemble from Austria. Founded in 2001 by harpsichordist Nikolaus Newerkla, the ensemble plays rearranged early British and Irish traditional music performed on period instruments.

Quadriga Consort has collaborated with South African-born jazz and pop singer Elisabeth Kaplan and has appeared at festivals in Austria, Europe and the United States. In 2019 Austrian singer Sophie Eder has taken over the part of the ensemble's voice.

Their record "On a Cold Winter's Day - Early Christmas Music and Carols from the British Isles" (SONY/Deutsche Harmonia Mundi) has become a classical music bestseller album.

- Sophie Eder (voice)
- Angelika Huemer (recorders, treble viol)
- Karin Silldorff (recorders)
- Dominika Teufel (tenor viol)
- Philipp Comploi (baroque cello/basse de violon)
- Tobias Steinberger / Laurenz Schiffermüller (percussion)
- Nikolaus Newerkla (harpsichord, vibrandoneon, voice, arrangements, composition, direction)

== Former members ==
- Elisabeth Kaplan (voice)
- Peter Trefflinger (baroque cello)
- Elisabeth Kurz (treble viol) (†2005)

== Discography ==
- 2003 Ground, HARP, Berlin
- 2005 As I Walked Forth: Songs & Tunes of the Isles, ORF, Vienna
- 2007 By Yon Bonnie Banks: Traditional Early Music of Scotland, ORF, Vienna - 5 stars, Goldberg Magazine, June 2007
- 2009 Quadriga Live: DVD, make, Vienna
- 2009 Songs from the British Isles, Live, GRAMOLA, Vienna
- 2011 Ships Ahoy!: Songs of Wind, Water and Tide, Alpha, Paris - "Pasticcio" award, radio ORF 1
- 2012/13 On a Cold Winter's Day: Early Christmas Music and Carols from the British Isles, Carpe Diem Records, Bremen (First Edition), later SONY/Deutsche Harmonia Mundi
- 2014 14 Tales of Mystery, SONY/Deutsche Harmonia Mundi
- 2015 Winter's Delights, SONY/Deutsche Harmonia Mundi
- 2021 Midsummer: Songs and Tunes from Scandinavia and the British Isles, SONY/Deutsche Harmonia Mundi

== Sheet Music ==
- Nikolaus Newerkla: Playford Dances & Carolan Tunes, Moeck, Celle, Germany, 2007
- Nikolaus Newerkla: Scarborough Fair, Moeck, Celle, Germany, 2008
- Nikolaus Newerkla: Ancient Tunes in New Consorts, Moeck, Celle, Germany, 2008
- Nikolaus Newerkla: Turlough O'Carolan - The Music of an Irish Harper, Bärenreiter, Kassel, Germany, 2012
- Nikolaus Newerkla: The English Dancing Master, Bärenreiter, Kassel, Germany, 2012
