= Paweł Tarnowski (footballer) =

Polish footballer

Personal information
- Full name: Paweł Tarnowski
- Date of birth: 28 June 1990 (age 36)
- Place of birth: Radom, Poland
- Height: 1.74 m (5 ft 9 in)
- Position: Midfielder

Team information
- Current team: Talent Warsaw
- Number: 90

Youth career
- –2007: Michałów Radom
- 2007–2008: Beniaminek Radom

Senior career*
Years	Team	Apps	(Gls)
2008–2012	Radomiak Radom	100+	(29+)
2012–2013	Jagiellonia Białystok	7	(0)
2013	→ Polonia Warsaw (loan)	10	(1)
2013–2015	Dolcan Ząbki	74	(14)
2016–2017	Podbeskidzie Bielsko-Biała	24	(2)
2017	Radomiak Radom	12	(1)
2017–2021	Znicz Pruszków	100	(18)
2021–2023	Ursus Warsaw	64	(19)
2023	Polonia Warsaw II	9	(6)
2023	Hutnik Warsaw	7	(0)
2024	Polonia Warsaw II	8	(2)
2025–	Talent Warsaw	15	(0)
- * Club domestic league appearances and goals as of 23:21, 4 July 2025 (UTC)

Paweł Tarnowski (born 28 June 1990) is a Polish professional footballer who plays as a midfielder for IV liga Masovia club Talent Warsaw.

== Honours ==
Radomiak Radom

- III liga Łódź–Masovia: 2011–12
- IV liga Masovia South: 2008–09

Polonia Warsaw II

- Polish Cup (Warsaw regionals): 2024–25
