= Nikolaus Newerkla =

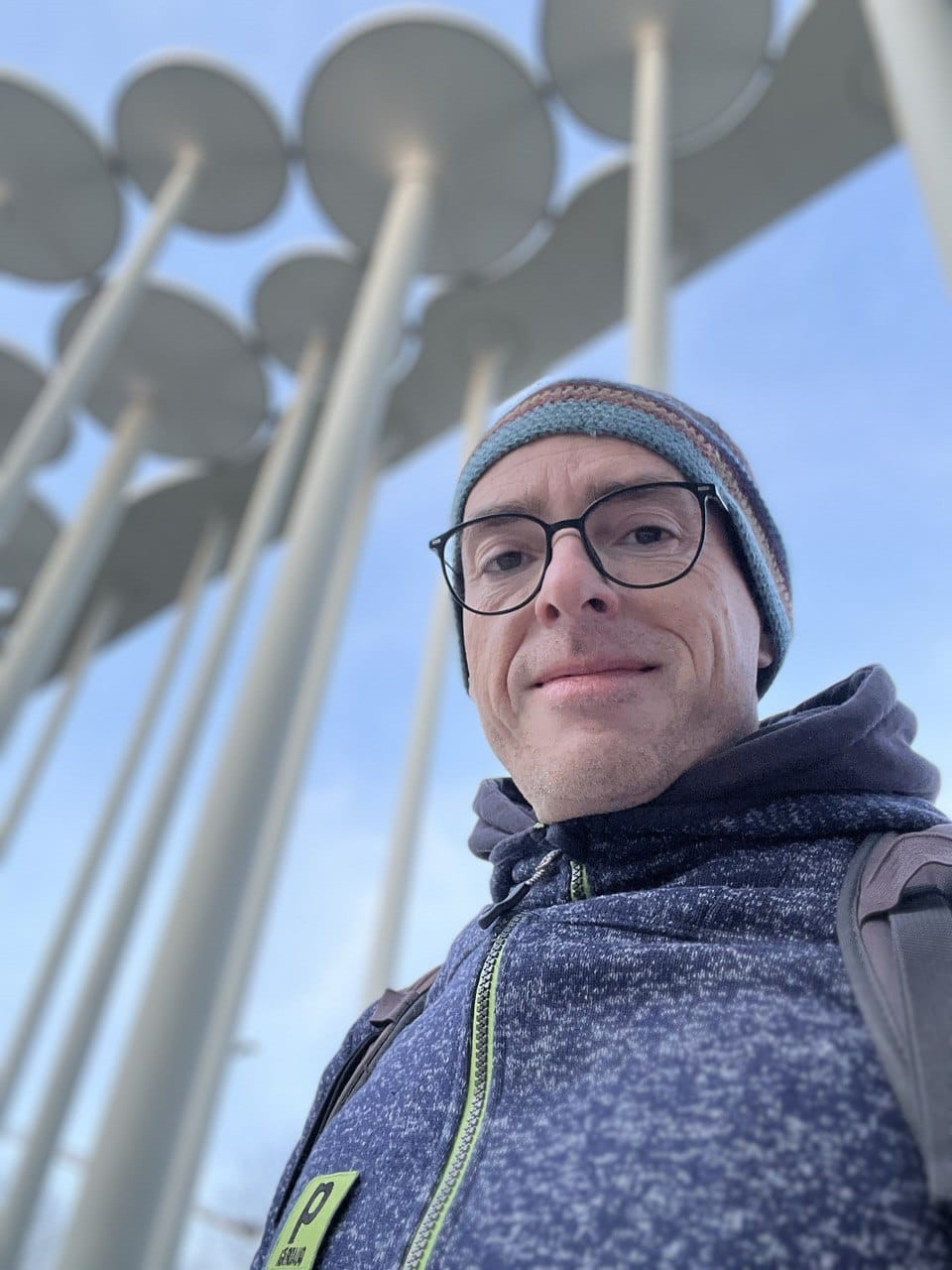
Nikolaus Philipp Newerkla, 2024

Nikolaus Philipp Newerkla (/ˈnəvərklɒ/; born 1974 in Horn, Austria) is a harpsichordist, arranger and conductor.

He began his musical career by studying piano at the University of Music in Graz under Eike Straub. Inspired by his long-standing teacher, the organist and improviser Kurt Neuhauser, he soon discovered his passion for historical keyboards and in particular the harpsichord.

As harpsichord player, arranger and conductor of the award-winning ensemble Quadriga Consort Nikolaus Newerkla has performed extensively throughout Europe and the United States with concerts at major music festivals. Lately the group has specialised on programmes with arrangements of ancient popular music from the British Isles. Newerkla is also engaged in arranging and composing (he received a two-year Kiwanis scholarship). He teaches at the University of Music and Performing Arts Graz, Austria.

== Sheet Music ==
- Nikolaus Newerkla: Playford Dances & Carolan Tunes, Moeck, Celle, Germany, 2007
- Nikolaus Newerkla: Scarborough Fair, Moeck, Celle, Germany, 2008
- Nikolaus Newerkla: Ancient Tunes in New Consorts, Moeck, Celle, Germany, 2008
- Nikolaus Newerkla: The Music of an Irish Harper, Bärenreiter, Kassel, Germany, 2012
- Nikolaus Newerkla: The English Dancing Master, Bärenreiter, Kassel, Germany, 2012
