= Asya =

Asya may refer to:

== Arts and entertainment ==
- Asya (1994 album), self-titled 1994 album by Turkish singer Asya
- Asya (1996 album), self-titled 1996 album by Turkish singer Asya
- Asya, former professional wrestler
- Asya, a novella by Ivan Turgenev
- Asya (film), a 1977 Soviet drama film
- The Story of Asya Klyachina, also known as Asya's Happiness and Asya Klyachina's Story, 1966 Soviet movie

== Others ==
- Bank Asya, Turkish private finance house
- Asya (given name), the given name

== See also ==
- Asia (disambiguation)
- Assia (disambiguation)
- ASJA (disambiguation)
