= Faust (novella) =

1856 novella by Ivan Turgenev

- Author: Ivan Turgenev
- Original title: Фауст
- Language: Russian
- Publication date: 1856
- Publication place: Russia
- Original text: Фауст at Russian Wikisource

Faust (Russian: Фауст, Faust) is a novella by Ivan Turgenev, written in 1856 and published in the October issue of the Sovremennik magazine in the same year. The story draws inspiration from Goethe's Faust, both as a tangible book around which the narrative revolves, and thematically. Turgenev narratively explores two contrasting concepts from Goethe: the Faustian desire for boundless pleasure and knowledge, and the moral impact of renunciation and self-restraint on the characters' lives.

== Background ==
Turgenev wrote "Faust" in the summer of 1856, while residing at Spasskoye, his late mother's estate in the Oryol Province. The estate's descriptions closely resemble the environment of Spasskoye, and the narrator's past experiences in the story are often compared to Turgenev's own life. Notably, in 1854, Turgenev was introduced to his neighbor, Maria Tolstaya, Leo Tolstoy's sister, at her residence, Pokrovskoye. This real-life connection is often compared to the character Vera and her lack of interest in creative literature.

Turgenev's connection with Goethe can be traced back to when he studied at University of Berlin between 1838 and 1841. His admiration for Goethe's works can be attributed to his meetings with Bettina von Arnim, and with Goethe's future English biographer George Henry Lewes. Turgenev proudly referred to himself as "an inveterate Goethe man." In 1844, Turgenev published a Russian translation of the final scene from Part One of Goethe's Faust, which coincided with Mikhail Vronchenko's translation of the whole of Part One.

== Central characters ==
- Pavel Alexandrovich – The protagonist and the narrator of the story. Approaching his forties, Pavel Alexandrovich is a man who returns to his family home in the Russian countryside in 1850 after nine years of absence. He is reflective, sensitive, and deeply affected by his experiences. His life is profoundly altered by his intense infatuation with Vera Nikolaevna.
- Vera Nikolaevna – Vera is Pavel's old love interest from his student days. She is the wife of Pavel's university classmate, Priimkov. Her reintroduction to Pavel's life makes her the object of Pavel's infatuation again. Vera is depicted as a woman of grace and innocence, having been sheltered from literature and the outside world by her mother, Mrs. Yelstova. She has had 3 children of which only a daughter survives. Inwardly and outwardly, she is depicted as youthful and innocent. Her curiosity about literature becomes the driving factor of the narrative.
- Mrs. Yelstova – Mrs. Yelstova is Vera's mother of Italian origin. She plays a significant role in Vera's upbringing, fiercely protecting her daughter's innocence by sheltering her from literature and the influences of the outside world. Even after her death, Mrs. Yelstova continued to have a strong influence on Vera's character.
- Priimkov – Priimkov is Pavel's old university classmate and Vera's husband. He is a secondary character in the story, and his obliviousness to Pavel's feelings for Vera adds tension to the narrative.
- Semyon Nikolayevich – Although not a physically present character in the story, Semyon Nikolayevich is the recipient of Pavel's letters. He is a confidant and friend of Pavel, to whom the letters are addressed. Semyon plays a vital role as the recipient of Pavel's confessions by reacting only minimally, allowing the story to unfold in an epistolary format.

== Plot ==
In a series of letters to his friend Semyon Nikolayevich, Pavel Alexandrovich narrates the events that take place after returning to his childhood home in the Russian countryside, starting from June 1850. Returning after a nine year absence, he reflects on the changes in the house, the garden, and the people. While going through the house and looking at the book collection, he becomes engrossed in reading Goethe's Faust, which triggers memories of his student days.

The next day, Pavel encounters an old university classmate, Priimkov, who is now married to Vera Nikolaevna. He recalls meeting 16 year old Vera and her mother Mrs. Yelstova when he was spending a summer at his cousin's estate in the Perm Governorate back in the 1830s. Mrs. Yelstova had an obsession with protecting her daughter's imagination from any outside influences, going to great lengths to ensure Vera's innocence. He recounts his growing attachment to Vera and his desire to marry her, although her mother objected and didn't let it happen. The news of Vera's proximity rekindles his curiosity and decides to meet her at Priimkov's estate.

The narrator is surprised to see that Vera has hardly changed at age 28, despite having given birth to three children. Mrs. Yelstova had long since died but somehow, Vera had not deviated much from the manner in which she was raised. The conversation turns to the subject of literature, where the narrator learns that Vera Nikolaevna has never read novels, poems, or any form of fictional literature, even after her late mother removed all restrictions on Vera after her marriage. He offers to introduce her to literature, beginning with Goethe's Faust. For these readings, visits to Priimkov's estate become common across the next few months.

During their readings, the narrator observes Vera closely and is captivated by her reactions. At first the narrator denies his romantic interest in Vera however it becomes quite obvious that he is infatuated with her. He admits to kissing Vera's hand while reading Eugene Onegin, however Vera seems firm on her boundaries. Besides literature, the narrator discusses several topics with Vera, such as their dreams, Vera's Italian heritage, and her fear of ghosts.

By the end of August, the narrator finally admits to being in love with Vera, despite his age and despite her marriage to Priimkov. He struggles to keep his emotions in check. Semyon seems disturbed by this and suggests visiting the narrator. The narrator quickly writes to stop him from coming and assures him that he will be contain himself.

The final letter is dated March 1853, two years after the events of the past eight letters, sent from a different location. Since the last letter, Vera confessed her feelings for him, and they shared a secret kiss. Vera then asked him to meet her secretly near their garden gate, to which he agreed eagerly. However, on the appointed day, Vera didn't show up. Instead, he noticed activity at her house, with her family still awake. Deciding not to intrude, he left and tried to resume his normal life. He later learned that Vera had fallen seriously ill, suffering from an undiagnosed condition. She had claimed to see her mother's ghost in the garden, which seemed to trigger her illness. Vera died in less than two weeks from the day they were supposed to meet. In her delirium, she repeatedly mentioned "Faust" and referred to her mother as either Martha or Gretchen.

Following her funeral, the narrator left everything behind and settled in a remote wilderness, where he would spend the rest of his days, haunted by the guilt of being the cause of Vera's loss of innocence and her untimely death. He echoes the motto of renunciation from Goethe's Faust.

== Comparison with Turgenev's other works ==
Turgenev's "Faust" centers around a pivotal event: the narrator reading Goethe's "Faust" to his love interest, Vera. This is a recurring motif in Turgenev's works during the 1850s, where literary interactions lead to significant consequences. This motif is also seen in his other stories such as A Quiet Spot (1854), where reading one of Pushkin's poems leads to disastrous consequences. In his story Rudin (1856), the protagonist reads works of German literature, including "Faust," to a young Russian girl who is in love with him. In Asya (1857), the narrator's recitation of Goethe's Hermann and Dorothea also has a significant impact on the heroine. A notable deviation from his other stories is that it is the introduction of a supernatural element which was not considered to be a characteristic of his works until the publication of this story.

The story has several recognizable elements from other Turgenev stories such as the awkward relationship between the hero and heroine, the hero's guilt and resignation, and the introspective nature of the protagonist.
