= List of Book Girl episodes =

Cover art of the Book Girl Memoir I DVD volume released by Pony Canyon, featuring main character Tohko Amano.

The Book Girl Japanese original video animation (OVA) episodes are based on a collection of Japanese light novels of the same name written by Mizuki Nomura, with illustrations by Miho Takeoka. They are directed by Shunsuke Tada and produced by the animation studio Production I.G. Composed by Masumi Itō, the music is produced by Lantis with Toshihiko Nakajima as the sound director. Chief animator Keita Matsumoto is also the character designer, and the screenplay was written by Yuka Yamada and Megumi Sasano. The story centers around Konoha Inoue, a writer in high school who joined the literature club after meeting Tohko Amano, the president and sole member of the club. Tohko can only eat stories by consuming the paper they are printed on and Tohko often asks Konoha to write her short stories as "snacks".

A stand-alone episode titled Book Girl Today's Snack: First Love was bundled with a limited-edition version of the second side story novel volume Book Girl: Apprentice's Heartbreak sold on December 26, 2009. A series of three OVAs under the collective title Book Girl Memoir covers stories primarily about three of the main characters: Tohko Amano for volume one, Miu Asakura for volume two, and Nanase Kotobuki for volume three. Tohko's episode, titled Prelude to the Dream Girl, was released on DVD on June 25, 2010. Miu's episode, titled Requiem of the Sky Dancing Angel, was sold on DVD on October 29, 2010. Nanase's episode, titled Rhapsody of the Maiden in Love, was released on DVD December 24, 2010.

The Book Girl Memoir OVAs have four pieces of theme music: one opening theme and three ending themes. The opening theme is "Musō Teien" (夢想庭園, Garden of Dreams) by CooRie. The ending theme for "Prelude to the Dream Girl" is "Koto no Ha" (言の葉, Words) by Kokia. The ending theme for "Requiem of the Sky Dancing Angel" is "Aozora no Mukō" (青空の向こう) by Masumi Itō. The ending theme for "Rhapsody of the Maiden in Love" is "Hidamari Hakusho" (陽だまり白書) by CooRie.

== Episode list ==
=== Book Girl Today's Snack: First Love ===
No.	Title	Original release date
1	"Book Girl Today's Snack: First Love"; Transliteration: "Bungaku Shōjo Kyō no Oyatsu: Hatsukoi" (Japanese: "文学少女"今日のおやつ 〜はつ恋〜)	December 26, 2009
On his way to school, Konoha Inoue sees his friend and fellow member of the literature club Tohko Amano, but decides to not call out to her after she starts searching through a trash bin. Tohko finds a bird house in the bin and takes it to school. After school, Tohko gives Konoha 50 minutes to write a short story, which she will later eat as a snack, with three topics: a bamboo boat, a love letter, and pole vaulting. As he starts writing, Tohko describes the novella First Love by Ivan Turgenev that she is currently reading and consuming. When time is up, Konoha has to rush the ending of his story and Tohko starts to read and eat it. Initially, she enjoys the story and its taste, akin to melon soda, but the story quickly turns sour and despite the taste now being of Tabasco sauce, finishes eating the story. The bird house is shown to have been painted by Tohko and placed on the school grounds with a note for people who need help in matters of love to leave letters for the literature club, who will solve their problems.

=== Book Girl Memoir ===
No.	Title	Original release date
1	"Book Girl Memoir I: Prelude to the Dream Girl"; Transliteration: "Bungaku Shōjo Memowāru I -Yumemiru Shōjo no Pureryūdo-" (Japanese: "文学少女"メモワール I -夢見る少女の前奏曲（プレリュード）-)	June 25, 2010
As a young girl, Tohko Amano is told by her father not to eat stories while others are around, and to wait to eat in front of someone she treasures. Years later, Tohko's parents died in an accident, and she is now in junior high living with Ryūto Sakurai and his mother, who was an acquaintance of her parents and dislikes Tohko. While at the publisher where her father used to work, Tohko reads an amateur novel which had been disqualified from a new author's contest. She asks that the story receives a re-read, and eventually, the novel wins the contest. The novel, Similar to the Sky by Miu Inoue (real name Konoha Inoue), becomes a hit and eventually gets adapted into a film. However, Tohko is crestfallen when she hears that the author will no longer write anymore. She later discovers that Konoha Inoue starts attending her high school, and he later sees her rip out a page of a book and eat it.
2	"Book Girl Memoir II: Requiem of the Sky Dancing Angel"; Transliteration: "Bungaku Shōjo Memowāru II -Sora Mau Tenshi no Rekuiem-" (Japanese: "文学少女"メモワール II -ソラ舞う天使の鎮魂曲（レクイエム）-)	October 29, 2010
From a young age, Miu Asakura grew up with her parents fighting, which caused her to focus on her imaginations and dream up wild stories. Other kids would stay away from her when they heard such tales, but Konoha Inoue starts hanging around with Miu, wanting to hear her stories. Miu later grows resentful of Konoha after going over to his house and seeing his happy life. In her rage, she kills his pet bird. So as to continue to appease Konoha, Miu begins plagiarizing stories to tell Konoha so that he would stay be her side. Later, in junior high school, Miu tells lies to a girl who is growing close to Konoha, who ends up slapping him and tells him she hates him. Miu and Konoha notice a new author's contest and Miu, who wants to be a writer, decides to enter, but try as she might, she cannot write even a single line. She ends up sending in a blank manuscript to make Konoha believe she participated. Unknown to her, Konoha also entered with the novel Similar to the Sky under the pen name Miu Inoue. Eventually, Konoha grows distant of Miu, who is driven to try to kill herself by jumping off the school roof, though she survives.
3	"Book Girl Memoir III: Rhapsody of the Maiden in Love"; Transliteration: "Bungaku Shōjo Memowāru III -Koisuru Otome no Rapusodi-" (Japanese: "文学少女"メモワール III -恋する乙女の狂想曲（ラプソディ）-)	December 24, 2010
While waiting for Konoha, Nanase Kotobuki reflects on some events that involved him in the past. Despite telling her friends she hates him, Nanase secretly holds feelings for Konoha, and is troubled that she cannot tell him how she feels. Her friend Kurara Mori tries to help her by sticking by her and giving her advice. Mori helps her in various ways, from taking her to practice laughing in the drama club, to calming her mind in the Japanese tea ceremony club, and even placing photos of Konoha inside her lunch box and books. Mori asks Konoha to protect Nanase during swim class by shielding her from gazes from the other guys, but she gets flustered and calls him a pervert, infuriating Mori. Nanase reflects on her mistakes, and tries very hard to give Konoha some homemade cookies the next day, but she fails each time. Later, Konoha finds her in the park with a stray dog, but Nanase gets hurt when she blindly runs into a parked truck after trying to avoid him. She is taken to the hospital for some tests and Mori comes to see her, followed by Konoha, who also brought the dog along. Back in the present, Konoha finally arrives and goes to visit a shrine with Nanase.
