= Peter Carson (translator) =

English publisher, editor and translator (1938–2013)

Peter Carson (3 October 1938 – 9 January 2013) was an English publisher, editor and translator of Russian literature.

He was educated at Eton College and learned Russian at home from his mother and during his National Service years at the Joint Services School for Linguists. He first worked at Longman and later worked at Penguin Books from 1972 to 1998; from 1980 as an editor-in-chief.

He translated two titles for Penguin Classics: a collection of five of Anton Chekhov's plays (Ivanov; The Seagull; Uncle Vanya; Three Sisters; The Cherry Orchard) and Fathers and Sons by Ivan Turgenev. The latter was praised by reviewers in the Times and the Times Literary Supplement. Donald Rayfield wrote in the Times Literary Supplement: "If you want to get as close as an English reader can to enjoying Turgenev, Carson is probably the best". He completed translations of Tolstoy's The Death of Ivan Ilyich, a story of a dying man, and A Confession shortly before his death; these were published together by Liveright in 2014 as The Death of Ivan Ilyich and Confession.

He was married to Eleo Gordon.
