= Virgin Soil =

1877 novel by Ivan Turgenev

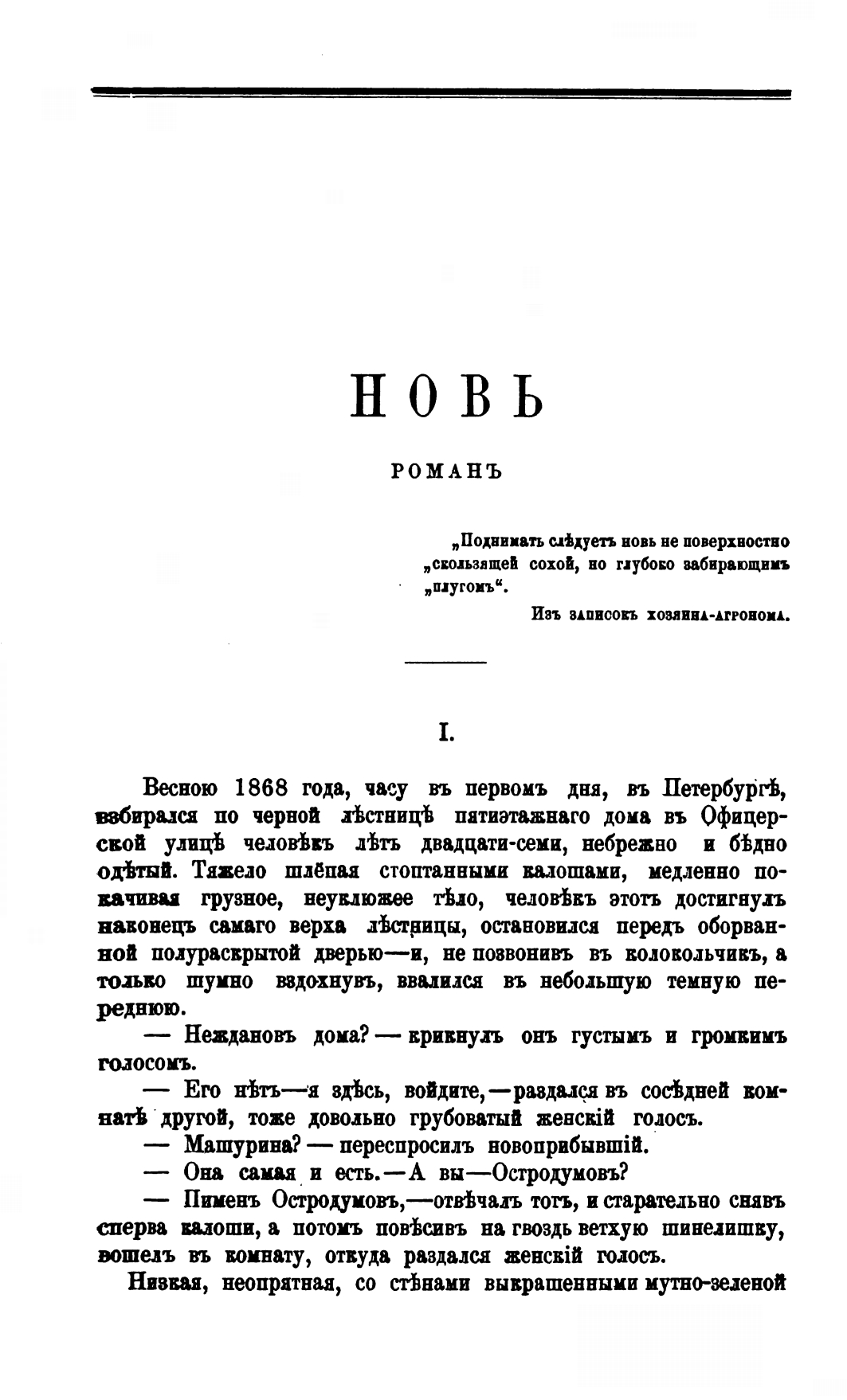
- Author: Ivan Turgenev
- Original title: Новь
- Language: Russian
- Genre: Political novel
- Publisher: Vestnik Evropy
- Publication date: 1877
- Publication place: Russia

Virgin Soil (Russian: Новь, romanized: Nov') is an 1877 novel by Ivan Turgenev. It was Turgenev's sixth and final novel as well as his longest and most ambitious.

== Plot ==
The novel centres on a depiction of some of the young people in 1868 and the early 1870s in Russia who decided to reject the standard cultural mores of their time, join the Populist movement, and 'go amongst the people', living the lives of simple workers and peasants rather than lives of affectation and luxury. The novel has a number of central characters around whom the action revolves. It explores, for instance, the life of Alexey Dmitrievich Nezhdanov, the illegitimate son of an aristocrat, who seeks to radicalise the peasantry and involve them in political action. He is given a job as tutor to Kolya, the nine-year-old son of Sipyagin, a local politician, and goes to live on his country estate. Whilst working there he becomes attracted to Marianna, the niece of the family.

Another central character is Vasily Solomin, who manages a local factory and is also a Populist, though one with less optimism about the potential of the movement to effect fundamental socio-economic change.

== Reception ==
One of the major concerns for Turgenev at the time of publication was his anticipated reception from the public on the one hand and the censor on the other; he expected, for instance, that his depiction of Populism and its adherents (seen as good people inherently, but unfortunately undertaking a path that Turgenev saw as not conducive to success) would gain a critical reception as hostile in some quarters as Fathers and Sons (in which he had explored the nihilism, a precursor of populism).

== See also ==
- Going to the People
