= Assia =

Assia may refer to:

== People ==
- Assia Noris (1912–1998), Russian Italian film actress
- Assia (singer) (born 1973), French pop singer
- Assia Djebar (1936–2015), Algerian novelist, translator and filmmaker
- Assia Wevill (1927–1969)
- Assia Dagher (1908–1986), Egyptian actress and film producer
- Lys Assia (1924-2018), Swiss pop singer
- Assia Sidhoum (born 1996), Algerian footballer

== Other uses ==
- Assia, Cyprus, village in Famagusta District, Cyprus
- ASSIA (company), a supplier of network management software
- Applied Social Sciences Index and Abstracts (ASSIA), an indexing and abstracting service

== See also ==
- Asya (disambiguation)
