= On the Eve =

1860 novel by Ivan Turgenev

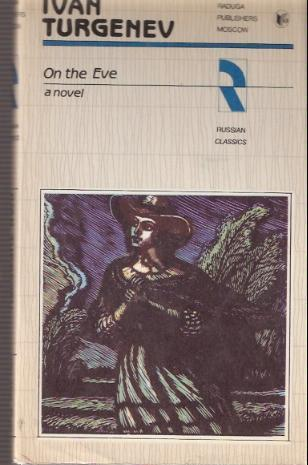
- Author: Ivan Turgenev
- Original title: Накануне
- Translator: Constance Garnett
- Language: Russian
- Genre: Political, Romance novel
- Publication date: 1860
- Publication place: Russia
- English publication date: 1895
- Media type: Print (Hardback and Paperback)
- Preceded by: Home of the Gentry
- Followed by: Fathers and Sons

On the Eve (Russian: «Накануне», Nakanune) is the third novel by Russian writer Ivan Turgenev. It has elements of social comedy but fell foul of radical critics who advocated the need of more overt reform.

== Plot ==
The story revolves around Elena Stakhova, a girl with a hypochondriac mother and an idle father, a retired guards lieutenant with a mistress. On the eve of the Crimean War, Elena is pursued by a free-spirited sculptor (Pavel Shubin) and a serious-minded student (Andrei Berzyenev). But when Berzyenev's revolutionary Bulgarian friend, Dmitri Insarov, meets Elena, they fall in love. In secretly marrying Insarov Elena disappoints her mother and enrages her father, who had hoped to marry her to a dull, self-satisfied functionary, Kurnatovski. Insarov nearly dies from pneumonia and only partly recovers. On the outbreak of war Insarov tries to return with Elena to Bulgaria, but dies in Venice. Elena takes Insarov's body to the Balkans for burial and then vanishes.

== Development and reception ==
Turgenev had long meditated On the Eve, wishing to represent a new type of idealistic but self-sacrificing heroine whom he eventually embodied in Elena. Following its long gestation, the book was written in a few months and first appeared in 1859 in the Moscow magazine The Russian Messenger, where it aroused interest but not universal approval. Turgenev himself had misgivings about On the Eve and these were strengthened by the adverse reaction of Countess Lambert, to whom he had promised to dedicate the novel. He was on the point of burning the manuscript until a friend dissuaded him. The novel's structural weakness is noted by the Encyclopaedia Britannica, which describes it as “an episodic work, further weakened by the shallow portrayal of its Bulgarian hero”.

A key contributing circumstance was that the central plot was not of Turgenev's invention. It derived from a notebook given him by Vassili Karatyeev before leaving for service in the Crimean War, from which the young recruit was not to return. Looking through its pages, Turgenev later recorded, “I found roughly sketched out what afterwards formed the subject of On the Eve, though the story was not completed and broke off abruptly. Karatyeev while in Moscow had become enamoured of a young woman who at first returned his love; later, however, she got to know a Bulgarian, fell in love with him and went away with him to Bulgaria, where he soon died. The story of this love was sincerely but clumsily recorded in the notebook - Karatyeev, indeed, was not born a writer. Only one scene, namely the journey to Tsaritsino, was depicted fairly vividly and I retained its main features.”

According to Edward Garnett in his introduction to the first English translation (1895), this reliance on a plot element based on the experience of another hindered Turgenev from characterising his hero successfully. Insarov was generally judged to be “a figure of wood”, and it was Elena who inspired most critical interest. Indeed, the first French translation of the novel in 1863 was titled simply Éléna, while the German translation of 1871 was similarly titled Helena, although with the Russian title bracketed after (translated as Am Vorabend).

== Adaptations ==
Elizabeth Egloff adapted the novel into a stage play titled "The Lover." It premiered at Baltimore's Center Stage theater in 1996.
