= ASJA =

ASJA may refer to:

- Asja, a given name (including a list of people with the name)
- American Society of Journalists and Authors
- Anjuman Sunnat-ul-Jamaat Association, Trinidad and Tobago
- AB Svenska Järnvägsverkstädernas Aeroplanavdelning, a former Swedish aircraft manufacturing company
- Association for Student Judicial Affairs, former name of the Association for Student Conduct Administration

== See also ==
- ASJA Boys' College, Trinidad and Tobago
