= Mumu (short story) =

Short story by Ivan Turgenev

- Short story by Ivan Turgenev
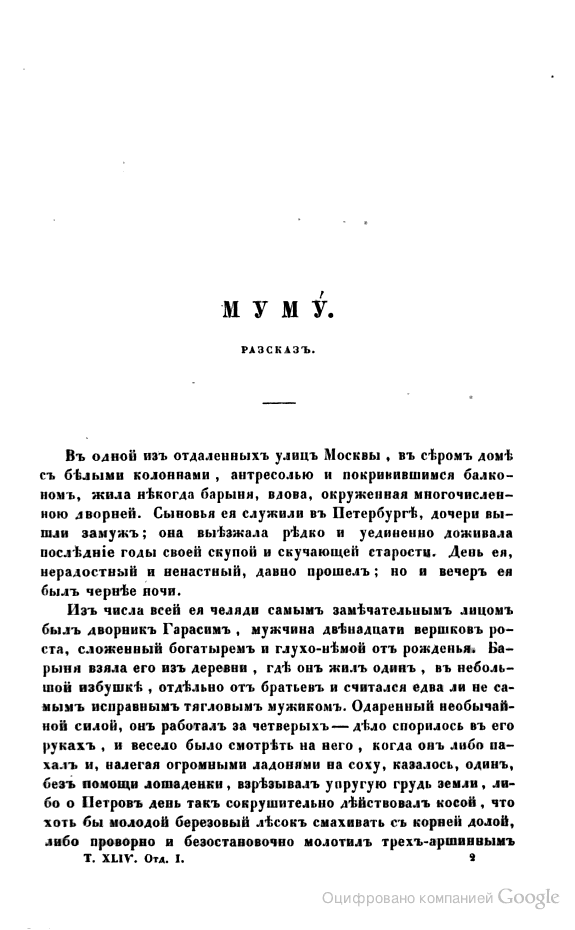
- First publication in 1854

Text available at Wikisource

Text available at Russian Wikisource
- Original title: Муму
- Country: Russian Empire
- Language: Russian

Publication
- Publisher: Sovremennik
- Publication date: 1854

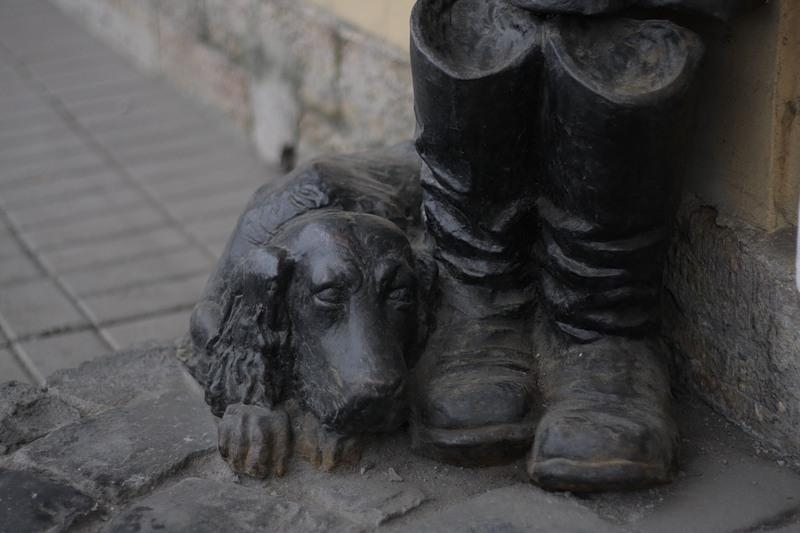
The statue of Mumu in front of the eponymous café in St. Petersburg

"Mumu" (Russian: Муму) is a short story by Ivan Turgenev, a Russian novelist and story writer, written in 1852 and published in 1854.

The story of Gerasim, a deaf and mute serf whose life of poverty is brought into sharp relief by his connection with Mumu, a dog he rescued, brought greater national attention to the cruelties of serfdom, and received praise for its brutal portrayal of this institution in Russian society.

== Background ==
Originally published in 1854, "Mumu" was written by Turgenev in 1852 while he was in custody for writing an obituary for fellow writer Nikolai Gogol.

From a good family, Turgenev was well-read, and had spent extensive time in the West (he was fluent in German, French, and English). His primary concern, and the main topic of his writings, was Russia, and he wrote only in Russian. Although attempting to improve and distinguish Russia, he was not a Slavophile, but voiced his alignment with the west. Turgenev was most concerned with writing about and discussing serfdom. One reason "Mumu" was such an indirectly powerful critique of serfdom was the ways in which it showed the terror of absolute power of one human being over another. For this story, and his writings for Gogol's obituary, Turgenev was banished to his estate.

Although part of the intelligentsia, Turgenev was criticized from both the left and right, as his views were not radical enough for the more revolutionary members of the intelligentsia. Instead, he was viewed as holding consistent liberal, romantic ideals. He was, however, one of the few writers who wrote on behalf of serfs, and against serfdom, treating serfs as humans with complex emotional lives. He once went so far as to take up arms in defense of a serf. This was reflected in his first work, A Sportsman's Sketches, which was both a condemnation of his mother's treatment of serfs, and the beginnings of his sympathetic portrayals of the peasantry.

"Mumu", therefore, is an intense exploration of serfdom and the position of the Russian peasantry. Gerasim, the main character, is meant to represent the Russian peasant at his most raw: strong but mute, submissive yet resistant. His work and situation is a direct tie to the peasantry, including his portrayal as a Russian folk hero. Turgenev evokes themes of the Russian folk hero, using words such as bogatyri to evoke a strong connection between the peasantry and the heroes of Russia's past.

== Characters ==
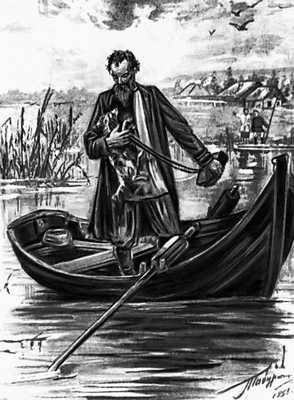
Illustration of Mumu by Vladimir Tabourine

- The landlady (barinya) - The lady of the house. An old, lonely and bitter widow who adheres to everything in the ancient ways. She cruelly decides and manipulates the fate of her serfs. In the story, she is the contrast to Gerasim, but she too is without love and has grown cruel and isolated. Based on Turgenev's mother, Varvara Petrovna Turgeneva.
- Gerasim - The porter in the household and protagonist of the story. Of remarkable size and strength, but deaf since birth. Gerasim is portrayed as a classical Russian folk figure, as both terrible and wonderful: mighty and sympathetic. He is also a symbol of the peasantry, while also very much his own person. Based on Andrey, who however did not leave the mistress.
- Mumu - The dog rescued, raised, and pampered by Gerasim. The dog is an orphan, like Tatiana, but unlike her is not afraid of Gerasim, but rather loves him unconditionally. She serves as an excellent watch-dog and devoted companion to her master. Ultimately, Gerasim is forced by the lady to drown Mumu in the river after she becomes angered by her rejection and barking.
- Tatiana - A household laundress. Described as a meek and timid woman, with few relations and abundant suffering. Like Gerasim, she is orphaned and alone. She becomes the object of Gerasim's desire, to which she responds with fear. She is ultimately forced by the lady to marry Kapiton.
- Kapiton Klimov - The shoemaker in the household, and resident drunkard. He is absorbed by self-pity, and forced by the lady of the house to marry Tatiana, whom he does not love.
- Volchok - The old guard dog that sits chained on the property: he does not try to obtain freedom, unlike Mumu, nor is he ever censured: He is meant to represent the downtrodden peasant.
- Gavrila Andreyevich - The head steward of the household who does his mistress’ bidding while also stealing from her.
- Liubov Lubimovna - A household maid, who attends to the mistress, as well as an old companion of Gavrila's who helps him steal from the mistress.

== Plot summary ==
The story opens in Moscow, at the home of an unnamed, wealthy, and elderly widow. Mean and spiteful, she has been abandoned by whatever living friends and relatives she still has. The exposition then focuses on one of her porters, Gerasim, a man from the countryside. Born deaf and mute, he communicates with the other servants of the estate via hand signs. He is a man of almost superhuman strength, and was renowned in the country for his work in the fields. After being taken from his village, he eventually settles into life in the city, and, while his presence inspires fear in the other servants, he is able to remain on at least cordial terms with them.

During this time, Gerasim becomes infatuated with Tatiana, the mistress’ laundress. He offers her gifts, including a gingerbread chicken, and follows her, smiling and making his characteristic unintelligible noises. His affection is quite protective, and he threatens a servant who “nags” her too severely. In another incident, Kapiton Klimov, the widow's shoemaker, speaks “too attentively” with Tatiana, and is, too, threatened by Gerasim.

Kapiton, a drunkard who feels unfairly castigated for his vices, is chosen by the mistress to be married off. Speaking with her head steward, Gavrila, the widow decides that Kapiton shall marry Tatiana. Gavrila, aware of Gerasim's affections but unable to disagree with his master, relates this to Kapiton, who reacts with fear but ultimately agrees. He then informs Tatiana, who acquiesces but echoes the same concerns. Gavrila comes up with a plan, and, noting Gerasim's hatred of drunkards, has Tatiana pretend to be drunk in his presence. The plot succeeds, and Tatiana and Kapiton are married. However, Kapiton's drinking only worsens, and he and his wife are sent away after a year to a small village. As they depart, Gerasim follows them, and hands Tatiana a red handkerchief, causing her to burst into tears.

During this walk, Gerasim encounters a dog drowning in a river. He saves her, whom he names Mumu, and nurses her back to health. He loves Mumu passionately, and she follows him around throughout his daily activities. After a year, the mistress sees Mumu in the yard, and has the dog brought to her. Mumu reacts poorly to the mistress, baring her teeth. The following day, Gavrila is ordered to get rid of Mumu, whose barking disturbs the widow, and he has the footman, Stepan, ambush the dog behind Gerasim's back and sell her in the market.

Gerasim, distraught, searches for Mumu for the entire day, but Mumu returns. He learns that Mumu's disappearance was an order from his lady, and begins hiding his dog in his room. However, Mumu's “whining” is still audible, and when she is finally brought into the yard, her barking alerts the mistress to her presence. Knowing that the servants will be coming for Mumu, Gerasim barricades himself with her in his room, but, after Gavrila signs to him, explaining the situation, he promises to get rid of Mumu himself.

He brings her to a cookshop, giving her a final treat before travelling to the river where he found her, commandeering a rowboat, and eventually drowns her—bringing his rescue of her full circle. He is followed by Eroshka, another servant, who reports back to the others. However, Gerasim does not return until night, when he gathers his things and then departs walking back to his old village. The mistress, initially angry, decides not to search for him, and soon dies. The story concludes with Gerasim returned to his fields, helping reap the harvest.

== Prototypes ==
The real story with the dog happened at Turgenevs' house in Moscow. The landlady was Turgenev's mother, Varvara Turgeneva, and the strong mute serf was Andrey. Unlike Gerasim, Andrey stayed with his mistress.

Varvara Zhitova, Varvara Turgeneva's adoptive or real daughter, tells a story of a marriage the mistress arranged for two of her favorite serfs, Agafya Semyonovna and Andrey Polyakov. That marriage turned out well, although the mistress demanded that all babies be put away, but they were kept at home secretly, so one day one of them had to have her mouth shut to hide her presence.

== Interpretations and themes ==
The role of chance

Chance and coincidence are themes throughout Turgenev's short works, and Mumu is no exception. Several incidents in the story are based entirely upon coincidence. For instance, Gerasim finds Mumu exactly as his beloved, Tatiana, departs with her husband. Mumu is then reduced to a victim of fate; the mistress's arbitrary cruelty acting as an agent of destiny. While some critics, notably Briggs, have called Turgenev's use of this device as clumsy, and even “egregious," it is less pronounced in this particular work than some of his others.

Love and isolation

A common theme discussed in this story is the presence and absence of love, and feelings of isolation which drive many of the characters’ decisions.

There are many instances and relationships lacking in affection in this story: Kapiton is not in love with Tatiana, the old woman has no family, and indeed, there is no mention of family in the entire story. At the beginning, this lack of affection seems like an insurmountable barrier: In Gerasim's love with Tatiana he is unable to overcome his muteness, to express his feelings and bridge this gap. This, however, changes when Gerasim finds Mumu. Mumu represents love in its purest form: Gerasim's muteness does not limit his ability to express his feelings, and Mumu is unquestionably devoted to him.

These different loves of Gerasim tie the story together: from Tatiana's departure, to the discovery of Mumu, and ultimately Mumu's death. The scene where Gerasim drowns Mumu seems almost like a wedding, drawing out the theme of tragic love. This love is, in part, so tragic because of Gerasim's lack of agency in finding and keeping love.

Gerasim is alone because he has no say, and the old lady forced him to leave his home, thus isolating him and forcing him to give up love. Gerasim goes on to reject love and thus ends the story alone.

Muteness

In the act of rendering Gerasim both deaf and mute, scholars discuss how Turgenev takes the role of an external observer to the greatest extreme. Due to his sensory failings, the author is unable to accurately represent his consciousness, or to infer his inner thoughts and feelings. In the first scenes of the story, Gerasim's inability to effectively communicate with his peers leaves him isolated and misunderstood.

Scholars suggest that by naming the dog Mumu, Gerasim finally acquires speech. His once meaningless moans become a meaningful word, that he can share with others. This language does not last long, however, for he is soon ordered to put the dog to death. With the death of Mumu, Gerasim also loses the only language he could possess.

Final rebellion

Critics are divided in their interpretations of Gerasims’ two final acts. To some the murder of Mumu represents the “ultimate manifestation of the hero’s enslavement," and his return to his Homeland represents his defeat. There remains debate whether Gerasim represents a slave resigned to fate or a rebel finally liberated. Some scholars believe that while killing the dog was an act of ultimate submission, it is only after killing Mumu that Gerasim finds the strength to break free.

Textual evidence implies that Gerasim did not plan his escape prior to the killing, because he had to return home to gather his things before breaking away. Furthermore, this idea of ultimate liberation is also supported by Turgenev's use of animal symbolism. When Gerasim is first brought to the estate he is described as an ox, a strong yet domesticated animal. In contrast, at the end of the story, he is compared to a lion, a wild and uninhibited creature.

== Adaptations ==
As an extremely influential work, which was taught in schools during the Soviet Regime, "Mumu" has had many adaptations. Several film and media adaptations have been created since its publication, as this work was extremely influential for many Russian-speaking children.
