= Smoke (Turgenev novel) =

1867 novel by Ivan Turgenev

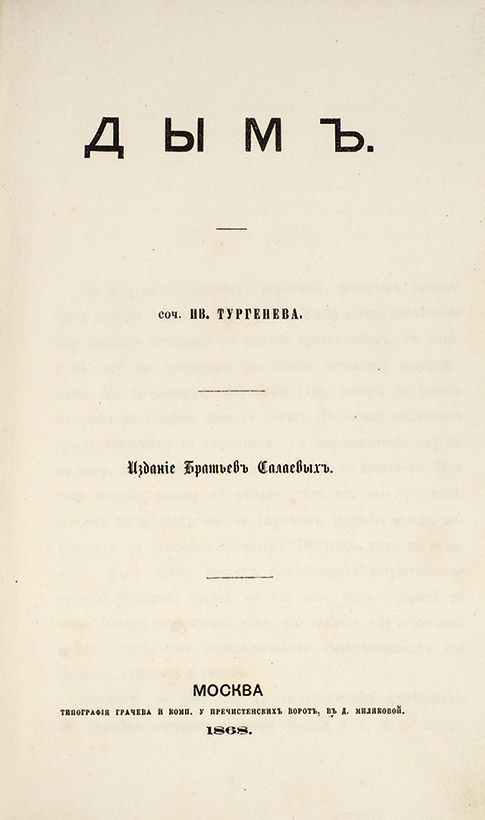
- First edition
- Author: Ivan Turgenev
- Original title: Дым
- Language: Russian
- Genre: Political novel
- Publisher: First published in The Russian Messenger (Ру́сский ве́стник Russkiy vestnik)
- Publication date: 1867
- Publication place: Russia
- English publication date: 1896
- Media type: Print (Hardcover)

Smoke (Russian: «Дым») is an 1867 novel by the Russian writer Ivan Turgenev (1818–1883) that tells the story of a love affair between a young Russian man and a young married Russian woman while also delivering the author's criticism of Russia and Russians of the period. The story takes place largely in the German resort town of Baden-Baden.

== Background and critical reception ==
Ivan Turgenev began work on what was to become Smoke in late 1865 and he carried a finished manuscript of the novel with him when he visited Russia in early 1867. In St. Petersburg, in February 1867, he gave several public charity readings from chapters of the book, all of which were met with approbation. Smoke was first published in the March 1867 issue of The Russian Messenger (Русский вестник Russkiy vestnik), one of the premier literary magazines of nineteenth-century Russia. The reception to Turgenev’s public readings was a bellwether, for upon publication in Russia the novel was met with almost immediate and universal condemnation in that country. Conservatives were enraged by his portrayal of the nobility, Slavophiles denounced Turgenev for denigrating his native Russia, while revolutionaries called the author a senile dodderer unable or unwilling to appreciate young Russians’ strength and will. As for Alexander Herzen, the exiled revolutionary the likes of whom Turgenev satirized in the character of Gubaryov, he wrote a largely negative review of the work in his revolutionary publication The Bell. The criticism of the novel for its supposed “anti-Russian” attitude arose from the fact that Smoke, more than simply a story of a ménage à trois (or even ménage à quatre) and a failed loved affair, is a roman à thèse, meant largely to display in ironical or farcical light the different strata of Russian society and to offer a political critique on the problems Russia was facing and the shortcomings of Russia’s would-be saviours.

Indeed, Smoke is a deeply satirical novel aimed not only at the conservative elements of Russian society who stubbornly refused reform and modernization but also at those Russian Slavophiles Turgenev had witnessed first hand abroad, more specifically Alexander Herzen and his young followers, who were rejecting European culture and glorifying a Slav mysticism in their campaign to remake Russia, and in the process badgering Turgenev for what appeared to them as his slavish adoration of European culture. In this, Turgenev focuses his ire on two groups that play prominently in the novel. On the one hand are a group of aristocratic “generals” who are resident in Baden and who form part of the entourage surrounding Litvinov's love interest Irina (and one of whom, General Ratmirov, is her husband). Their apparent disdain for Russia includes a pernicious chauvinism. Opposing them is a mixed group of radicals, who represent a new Slavophile socialism that is at least in part derived from the ideas of Herzen and his circle. Thus, for Turgenev, the similarities between them, rather than the surface opposition, lie at the heart of his criticism. Both groups deal in abstracts; both are far removed from any practical realities; and both ignore what for Turgenev remains the necessary element for the future of Russia: hard work in the context of the lessons of Western "civilization" in the broadest sense and above all concrete practicality. That viewpoint is presented by one of Turgenev's most problematic protagonists, Sozont Potugin, whose unsuccessful personal life stands in sharp contrast with the forcefulness of his Westernist views.

Aside from the few stories within the story, such as the early history of Litvinov and Irina Ratmirov, and the brief concluding chapters, the entirety of the novel takes place in Baden-Baden, a German resort town famous for its waters and gambling houses and a popular gathering spot for the elite of nineteenth century Europe. Turgenev’s description of the town came first-hand, for he had lived for a period in Baden, the novel was written there, and the episodes and characters are undoubtedly drawn from life. Turgenev had come to Baden-Baden to be near Madame Viardot, the opera singer and his most intimate, lifelong friend.

== Plot ==
The novel opens in the German bathing resort of Baden-Baden (or simply Baden) in the summer of 1862, where the young Russian Grigory Litvinov has arrived en route home to Russia to meet his fiancée Tatiana Shestov, who will soon be arriving with her aunt and guardian, Kapitolina Markovna Shestov, from Dresden. In Baden Litvinov soon encounters Rostislav Bambaev, an acquaintance from Moscow. Later that evening at a social gathering Bambaev introduces Litvinov to the political activist Stepan Nikolaevitch Gubaryov. Litvinov is not overly impressed by the gathering nor especially by the nondescript looking Gubaryov. After this Litvinov returns to a local restaurant where he is approached by Sozont Ivanitch Potugin, who introduces himself to Litvinov as a fellow Russian. Litvinov had noted Potugin at the earlier get-together at Gubaryov’s where Potugin had not spoken a word. Potugin now opens up to Litvinov and Litvinov in turn is captivated by Potugin’s way with words. In a rather one-sided conversation Potugin vents his frustrations regarding the Russian character – its tendency towards servitude and flights of idealism that lead nowhere. Later back in his rooms, Litvinov finds a letter from his father and also a gift of heliotrope flowers on his windowsill brought by a mysterious woman who, according to the servant, did not leave her name. The letter from his father reveals the superstition of the rural Russian. The flowers, though they come without a note, seem to strike a deep and powerful resonance with Litvinov. Later that night, unable to sleep, he suddenly realizes who might have brought them.

The story now reverts to about a decade earlier to relate the background story of the young Grigory Litvinov and Irina Osinin. Acquaintances in Moscow, the two fall in love when barely out of childhood and promise themselves to one another. Unlike Litvinov, Irina comes from an ennobled family of long pedigree, though in recent times fallen into near penury. One day the Osinin family, in view of their nobility, are invited to a ball being thrown by the emperor on his visit to Moscow. Irina agrees to go though she pleads with Litvinov not to go himself and Litvinov acquiesces to her wishes, though he does bring her a bouquet of heliotrope. Irina’s beauty makes quite an impression at the court ball and the very next day the court chamberlain Count Reisenbach, a relation of the Osinins and a wealthy man with high connections, decides he will adopt his niece Irina and bring her to live with him in St. Petersburg. Irina is heartbroken but bends to her parents’ wishes to become his adopted niece and heiress. It means leaving Litvinov and she writes to him breaking off their relationship. Soon thereafter she is whisked away to St. Petersburg and her new home.

The story moves back to Baden. Litvinov wonders excitedly whether it wasn’t Irina who left him the flowers. The next morning Litvinov decides to escape Baden and the Russian crowd by hiking alone up in the hills around the town's old castle. Stopping later at the old castle for refreshment, he encounters the arrival of a large Russian entourage, clearly composed of Russian nobility of the highest rank, many in military uniforms. Among them, a young woman calls to Litvinov and he soon recognizes her as Irina, his former love. The ten years since their last meeting in Moscow has brought her to her full bloom and he is struck by her mature beauty. Litvinov is introduced to her husband, the general Valerian Vladimirovitch Ratmirov, an affable man who it soon becomes clear holds very conservative opinions, wishing to turn back the clock on all the reforms that have taken place in Russia. As the “son of a plebeian”, Litvinov feels out of place among these aristocrats and put off by their manners and opinions. He bids farewell to Irina and she urges him to come see her while in Baden.

The Hohenbaden, or old castle, near Baden-Baden, where Litvinov again meets Irina.

Though affected by his meeting with Irina, Litvinov does not go to see her. Several days pass. A letter from Tatiana telling him that she will be delayed arriving in Baden due to the illness of her aunt puts Litvinov in a petulant mood. One day Potugin comes to see Litvinov. Litvinov is glad for the company but soon learns that Potugin knows Irina quite well and that he has in fact come to bring a message from her urging Litvinov to come see her that very day. He agrees. Irina is staying in one of the finest hotels in the city and her husband is away on personal business. Irina and Litvinov have a long talk catching up on the past decade. Irina pleads with Litvinov to forgive her for what she did to him and Litvinov seems to dismiss the notion of forgiveness, as those events were long ago in their childhood. When Litvinov touches upon the flowers left in his room, Irina claims to know nothing about them. The return of Irina’s husband seems to break up the meeting. Later Litvinov passes Irina again while out walking but feigns not to recognize her. Irina later accosts him on his walk, asking why he ignores her and pleading with him not to do so, for she is desperate and alone and misses their simple relationship. Litvinov tells her what is in his heart, that she meant much to him and was the cause of great anguish and now that their paths and situations are so different he sees no point in renewing an acquaintance has only the potential to hurt again and to reveal to Irina how much power she still holds over him. She urges him again warmly that they might be, if not friends, at least friendly, “as if nothing had happened.” Litvinov promises her not to treat her as a stranger, though he still does not understand her intentions. Irina is then called off by the approach of an aristocratic friend. Litvinov, walking on, again encounters Potugin, now sitting and reading on a bench. They have another lengthy conversation about Russia that Potugin dominates, ridiculing those Slavophiles who are constantly heralding the native Russian genius but who refuse to see that the mastery of things comes with training and education and not through any internal nature or instinct. Litvinov is still unable to learn of just how Potugin knows Irina, only that he has known her for some time. Returning to his rooms, Litvinov later finds an invitation from Irina to attend a soiree in her rooms, where he will be able to meet many from her circle and better understand “the air she breathes.” Litvinov later attends this soiree and returning to his rooms comes to realize with exhilaration and horror that he loves Irina and that his marriage with Tatiana is threatened by this looming passion. Litvinov decides he must leave Baden and Irina forever and makes arrangements for the omnibus to Heidelberg. He visits Irina’s hotel rooms to reveal both his love and his determination to leave rather than ruin himself. Irina is moved by this confession and though she initially supports his decision, she later comes to him to confess her love and tells him her destiny is in his hands.

Meanwhile, Tatiana and her aunt arrive from Dresden. Litvinov’s rather distant attitude towards Tatiana has his fiancée suspicious that something is not right. When the couple pass Irina on the street and Irina throws them a glance, Tatiana’s suspicions are further aroused. That evening, rather than staying with his fiancée and her aunt, Litvinov goes to see Irina who has summoned him. Irina tells him that he is in no way obligated to her and that he should feel completely free. On the way back to Tatiana’s rooms Litvinov encounter Potugin, who is forward enough to warn Litvinov to beware of his love for Irina and to not cause Tatiana pain. Litvinov feels insulted by this presumption on the part of Potugin, but the latter assures him he speaks from experience, for he too has been ruined by his love of Irina, albeit a love that has never been and never will be requited.

The story then reverts to eight years previous to relate Potugin’s history with Irina. At that time he was still working as a government official and would visit the country estate of the Count Reisenbach, the guardian of the young Irina, near St. Petersburg. Later, Irina, realizing that the older Potugin had fallen in love with her, uses this leverage to seek a great favour of Potugin. Irina’s close friend Eliza Byelsky, an orphan but the heir of a wealthy estate, was facing ruin (though left unsaid in the novel, this is understood to be pregnancy out of wedlock). For a large sum of money, but primarily because Irina desired it, Potugin agreed to secretly marry Eliza. Eliza later had her child, a daughter whom Potugin then adopted, before poisoning herself. Since that time Potugin has followed in the train of the Ratmirovs, utterly devoted to Irina.

Back at his hotel, Litvinov spends the evening with Tatiana and her aunt. He now tells Tatiana that he has something important he must tell her the next day. Tatiana has a foreboding of what this might be. The next morning a distraught Litvinov attempts to inform Tatiana of the situation but it is Tatiana, rather, who guesses he has fallen in love with that other woman they saw on the street. Soon thereafter, Tatiana leaves unceremoniously and goes back to Dresden with her aunt without leaving any farewell note for Litvinov. Meanwhile, Litvinov writes a letter to Irina telling her of his break and urging her to run away with him only if her will is strong enough to stand such a life. If not, he will go away. Irina arranges for him to come see her again when her husband is out, and she reaffirms her commitment to follow him, though all her finances are in her husband’s hands. Eventually, however, Irina writes to Litvinov telling him that despite her love she is not strong enough to abandon her current life and declaring sorrowfully that she is unable to elope with him. Litvinov is heart-broken and leaves Baden on the train back to Russia. Along the way he muses over the mutability and seeming meaninglessness of all things, which have all the permanence of the smoke being blown forth by the train.

Back in Russia Litvinov returns to his estate in time to see his elderly father pass away. On his land Litvinov slowly recovers and even begins gradually to implement some of the land management and agricultural techniques he had learned in Europe. One day he hears through a visiting relative that Tatiana is living not too far away on her own estate with Kapitolina. He writes to Tatiana asking if he might visit her one-day and she responds in the affirmative, signaling to Litvinov that she has forgiven him. Litvinov wastes little time and sets out for her village. At a way station en route he encounters none other than Gubaryov and his brother. They reveal their true colors by their derision of the peasantry and their base treatment of Bambaev who, his finances wiped out, has been forced to become a servant to the Gubaryovs. Arriving at Tatiana's, Litvinov falls at her feet and kisses the hem of her dress. Here the narrator leaves the story, with the note that readers can guess the end by themselves.

As he does with almost all his novels, Turgenev then briefly relates what became of some of the other characters. Irina is related to be older but still lovely, with young men still falling in love with her "ironical intellect." Her husband is steadily rising in the world. As for Potugin, the little girl he had adopted has died but he still follows in the train of Irina.

== Major characters (in order of appearance in novel) ==
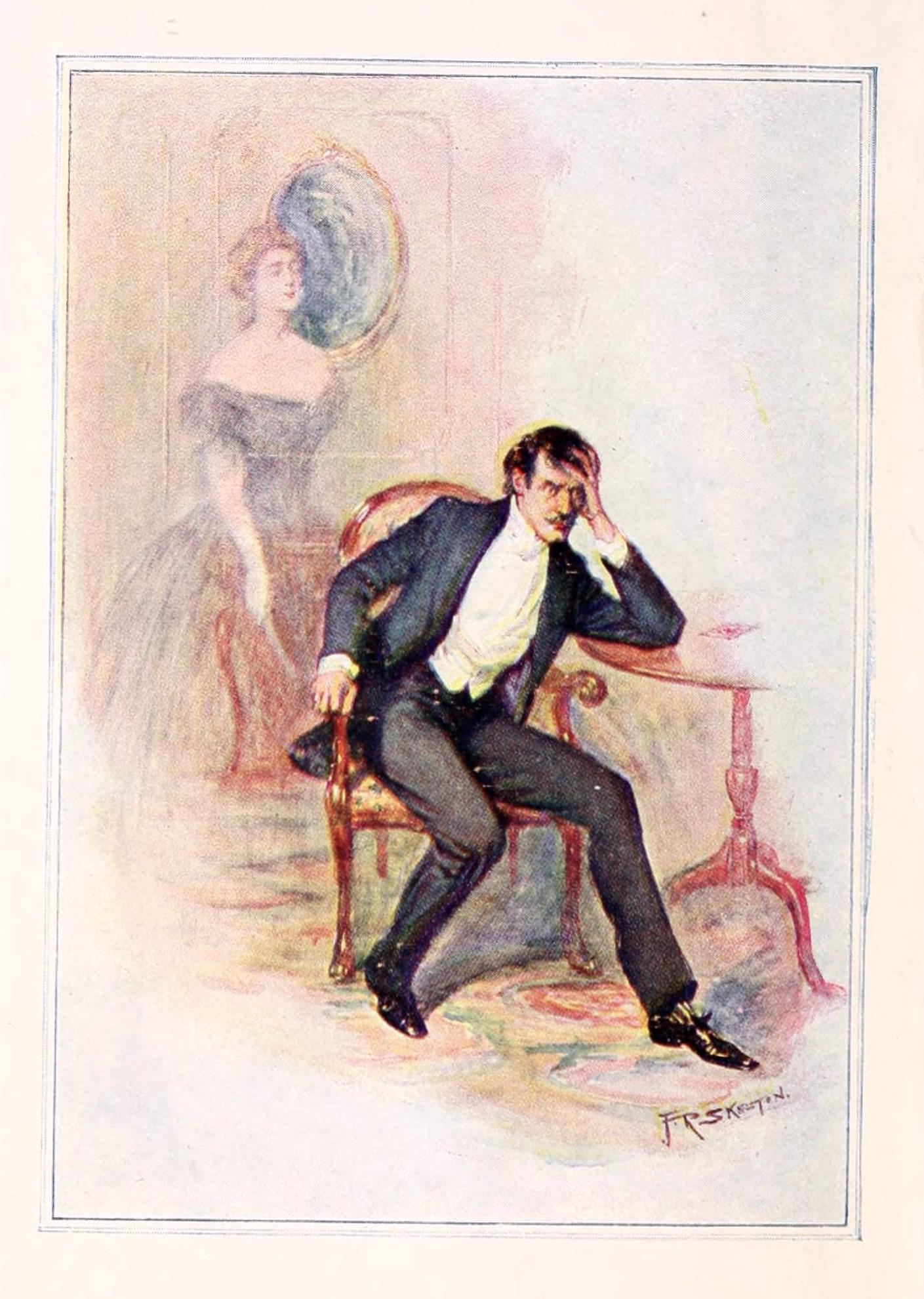
Grisha Litvinov

Grigory (Grisha) Mihailovitsh Litvinov – a young Russian of about thirty, the son of a woman of noble extraction and a plebeian father; he served some time in the military and now is heir to his family estate

Tatiana (Tanya) Petrovna Shestova – the cousin of Grigory Litvinov and his betrothed at the opening of the novel

Kapitolina Markovna Shestova – aunt and guardian of Tatiana; an unmarried women in her fifties and of liberal political leanings; a free spirit and an anti-aristocratic “democrat”, there is something of the hypocrite in her as she could not resist the urge of coming to the resort of Baden to gaze upon the aristocratic and fashionable crowd she abjures

Rostislav Bambayev – an acquaintance of Litvinov’s from Moscow

Semyon Yakovlevitch Voroshilov – a young liberal thinker and would-be activist; his ideas are largely not his own nor very well understood by him but this in no way detracts from his earnestness; he worships Gubaryov

Stepan Nikolaevitch Gubaryov – a Russian exile and well-known revolutionist

Matrona Semyonovna Suhantchikova – A Russian liberal Litvinov first meets at Gubaryov’s; Turgenev is not kind in his rendering, painting her largely as a hypocrite who pays lips service to lofty ideals but is mostly attracted to petty gossip and prone to back-stabbing

Pishtchalkin - a minor, and model, Russian landowner

Sozont Ivanovich Potugin – a retired Russian technocrat who befriends Litvinov early in the novel; a pro-Western figure who holds very cynical views of the Russian or Slav character and its penchant for abstract and ultimately impotent talk over practical action; yet he professes his love for Russia; he is in Baden with his young adopted daughter and is a devotee of Irina, and a victim of his unrequited love for her

Irina Pavlovna Osinina - a beautiful woman from an established noble, though impoverished, family; she is the childhood friend and then fiancee of a very young Litvinov; she abruptly broke off her relations with Litvinov ten years before the main story takes place, seduced by the possibilities of high society; she meets Litvinov again, now as a married woman, in Baden

Valerian Vladimirovitsh Ratmirov – a Russian general and husband of Irina Pavlovna Osinin
