= First Love (Turgenev novella) =

Novella written by Ivan Turgenev

- Author: Ivan Turgenev
- Original title: Первая любовь (Pervaya lyubov)
- Language: Russian
- Publication date: March 1860
- Publication place: Russia

First Love (Russian: Первая любовь, Pervaya lyubov) is a novella by Ivan Turgenev, first published in 1860. It is one of his most popular pieces of short fiction. It tells the love story between a 21-year-old girl and a 16-year-old boy.

== Background ==
First Love was published in March 1860 in the Biblioteka Dlya Chteniya magazine. The author claimed it was the most autobiographical of all his works. Here Turgenev is retelling an incident from his own life, his infatuation with a young neighbor in the country, Princess Catherine Shakhovskoy (the Zinaida of the novella), an infatuation that lasted until his discovery that Catherine was in fact his own father's mistress.

Critics were divided. Some criticized its light subject matter that did not touch upon any of the pressing social and political issues of the day. Others condemned the impropriety of that subject matter, namely a father and son in love with the same woman and a young woman who was the mistress of a married man. But it had its many admirers, including the French novelist Gustave Flaubert, who gushed in a letter to Turgenev, "What an exciting girl that Zinochka [Zinaida] is!" The Countess Lambert, a close acquaintance of Turgenev, told the author that the Russian emperor himself had read the novella to the empress and been delighted by it.

== Central characters ==
Vladimir Petrovich – The storyteller, at the time of narration a 16-year-old boy; the protagonist of the story.

Zinaida Alexandrovna Zasyekina – The object of Vladimir's affections. Capricious, mocking and difficult, she is inconsistent in her affections towards her suitors, of which Vladimir is the one to whom she shows (outwardly) the most affection. However, it is the affection of sister to brother rather than between lovers.

Pyotr Vasilyevich – Vladimir's father, a stoic symbol of 19th century masculinity; very 'British' in outlook and apparently unreceptive to emotion but the object of quiet admiration by the son

== English translations ==
- Turgenev, Ivan. Turgenev's Novels, v. 11 ("The Torrents of Spring." "First Love." "Mumu."). Trans. Constance Garnett. London: Heinemann, 1897. Out of print.
- Turgenev, Ivan. First Love & Other Stories. Trans. Isabel F. Hapgood. New York: Charles Scribner's Sons, 1915. Out of print. Now available from Copyright Group (London), 2022. ISBN 9781803542119.
- Turgenev, Ivan. First Love. Trans. Isaiah Berlin. London: Hamish Hamilton, 1950. Out of print. Now available in Penguin Classics, 1978. ISBN 0-14-044335-5.

Penguin edition includes an introduction by V.S. Pritchett.

- Turgenev, Ivan. First Love and Other Stories, Oxford World's Classics. Trans. Richard Freeborn. New York: Oxford University Press, 1999. ISBN 0-19-283689-7.

The translation is based on the text from I.S. Turgenev, Polnoye sobraniye sochineniy i pisem. Moskva-Leningrad, Vol. IX, 1965, pp. 7–76. This edition also contains The Diary of a Superfluous Man, Mumu, Asya, King Lear of the Steppes, and The Song of Triumphant Love.

- Turgenev, Ivan. First Love. New York: Penguin Books, 2007.

== Adaptations for stage and screen ==
"Pervaya lyubov'" (Первая любовь) USSR, Mosfilm 1968, 76 min

A German-Swiss film adaption of Turgenev's novella directed by Maximilian Schell was released on 1970 and was nominated for the Academy Award for Best Foreign Language Film.

Anne Flournoy's 1983 short Nadja Yet is an adaptation of "First Love." Zinaida Alexandrovna Zasyekina is played by Jenny Wright. Pyotr Vasilyevich is played by Stephen Payne. Vladimir Petrovich is played by a live-action housefly. Nadja Yet can be seen on YouTube.

The film Lover's Prayer combining Turgenev's novella and Chekhov's The Peasant Woman was released in 2001.

The Tamil language movie Sindhu Samaveli is an adaptation of First Love. In a literary context, Sindhu Samaveli is the Tamil name for the Indus Valley civilization.

Takarazuka Revue's 2014 Bowhall production "Nocturne - Memory of a Distant Summer Day" (ノクターン －遠い夏の日の記憶－) is a musical adaptation of the novella.

In 2020, an adaptation of the novella titled About Love was presented off-Broadway at the Sheen Center for Thought & Culture.

== Modern reception ==
The story was featured at number four on Rosa Rankin-Gee's top 10 novellas about love via The Guardian and featured in a similar roundup by The New York Times in 2013.

In his Lectures on Russian Literature, Vladimir Nabokov wrote:

Turgenev wrote numerous short stories and long short stories and nouvelles. The early ones are devoid of any special originality or literary quality; some of the later are quite remarkable. Among the latter "A Quiet Backwater" and "First Love" deserve particular mention.
