= Asja =

Asja is a Slavic feminine given name, originating as a pet form of Anastasia and Anna. Notable persons with the name Asja include:

- Asja Hrvatin (born 1990), Slovene writer and researcher
- Asja Lācis (1891–1979), Latvian actress and theatre director
- Asja Maregotto (born 1997), Italian rower
- Asja Paladin (born 1994), Italian professional racing cyclist
- Asja Zenere (born 1996), Italian alpine skier
