= Rudin =

1856 novel by Ivan Turgenev

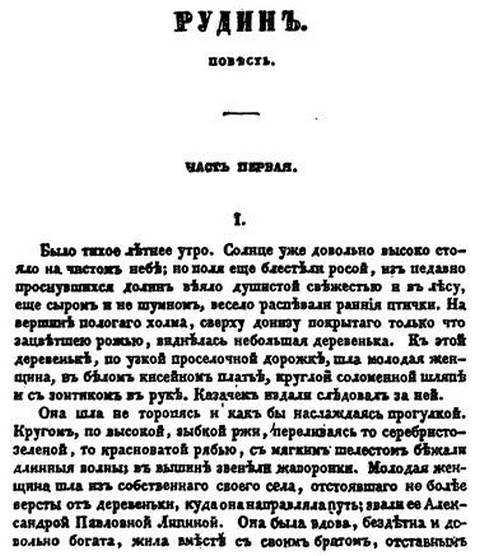
- Author: Ivan Turgenev
- Original title: Рудин
- Translator: Constance Garnett (1894); Richard Freeborn (1975)
- Language: Russian
- Genre: Political, Romance
- Publisher: Sovremennik
- Publication date: 1856
- Publication place: Russia
- English publication date: 1894
- Text: Rudin at Wikisource

Rudin (Russian: «Рудин», pronounced [ˈrudʲɪn]) is the first novel by Russian realist writer Ivan Turgenev. Turgenev started to work on it in 1855, and it was first published in the literary magazine "Sovremennik" in 1856; several changes were made by Turgenev in subsequent editions.

Rudin was the first of Turgenev's novels, but already in this work the topic of the superfluous man and his inability to act (which became a major theme of Turgenev's literary work) was explored. Similarly to other Turgenev's novels, the main conflict in Rudin was centred on a love story of the main character and a young, but intellectual and self-conscious woman who is contrasted with the main hero (this type of female character became known in literary criticism as «тургеневская девушка», “Turgenev girl”).

== Context ==
Rudin was written by Turgenev in the immediate aftermath of the Crimean War, when it became obvious to many educated Russians that reform was needed. The main debate of Turgenev's own generation was that of Slavophiles versus Westernizers. Rudin depicts a typical man of this generation (known as 'the men of forties'), intellectual but ineffective. This interpretation of the superfluous man as someone who possesses great intellectual ability and potential, but is unable to realize them stems from Turgenev's own view of human nature, expressed in his 1860 speech ‘Hamlet and Don Quixote’, where he contrasts egotistical Hamlet, too deep in reflection to act, and enthusiastic and un-thinking, but active Don Quixote. The main character of the novel, Rudin, is easily identified with Hamlet.

Many critics suggest that the image of Rudin was at least partly autobiographical. Turgenev himself maintained the character was a "fairly faithful" portrait of the anarchist Mikhail Bakunin, whom the author knew well. Alexander Herzen, who knew both men, said in his memoirs that the vacillating Rudin had more in common with the liberal Turgenev than the insurrectionist Bakunin.

Rudin is often compared to Pushkin’s Eugene Onegin and Lermontov’s Pechorin. The latter two are considered to be representations of their generations (‘men of twenties’ and ‘men of thirties’ respectively) as Rudin is considered to be a representation of his generation; the three literary works featuring these characters share many similarities in structure and all three characters are routinely referred to as ‘superfluous men’ (whether the term is applicable to all three has been a subject of scholarly debate).

For a long time, Turgenev was unsure of the genre of Rudin, publishing it with a subtitle of ‘novella’. In 1860, it was published together with two other novels, but in the three editions of Turgenev's Works that followed it was grouped with short stories. In the final, 1880, edition it was again placed at the head of the novels. The theme of the superfluous man in love was further explored in Turgenev's subsequent novels, culminating in Fathers and Sons.

== Main characters ==
=== Dmitrii Nikolaevich Rudin ===
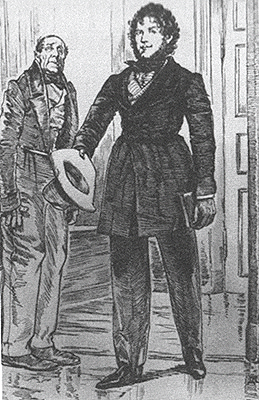
Rudin's first appearance at Lasunskaya's, by Dmitry Kardovsky

The main protagonist of the novel. Rudin is a well-educated, intellectual and extremely eloquent nobleman. His finances are in a poor state and he is dependent on others for his living. His father was a poor member of the gentry and died when Rudin was still very young. He was brought up by his mother, who spent all the money she had on him, and was educated at Moscow University and abroad in Germany, at Heidelberg and Berlin (Turgenev himself studied in Berlin). When he first appears in the novel, he is described as follows: “A man of about thirty-five […] of a tall, somewhat stooping figure, with crisp curly hair and swarthy complexion, an irregular but expressive and intelligent face.[…] His clothes were not new, and were somewhat small, as though he had outgrown them.” In the course of the novel he lives at Dar’ya Mikhailovna's estate and falls in love with her daughter, Natalya. This love is the main conflict of the novel. His eloquence earns him the respect of the estate's inhabitants, but several other characters display a strong dislike of him, and during the course of the novel it becomes apparent that he is “almost a Titan in word and a pigmy in deed” — that is, despite his eloquence he cannot accomplish what he talks of.

=== Natal’ya Alekseevna Lasunskaya ===
Also referred to as Natasha. Natasha is a seventeen-year-old daughter of Dar’ya Mikhailovna. She is observant, well-read and intelligent, but also quite secretive. While her mother thinks of her as a good-natured and well-mannered girl, she is not of a high opinion about her intelligence, and quite wrongly. She also thinks Natasha is ‘cold’, emotionless, but in the beginning of Chapter Five we are told by the narrator that “Her feelings were strong and deep, but reserved; even as a child she seldom cried, and now she seldom even sighed and only grew slightly pale when anything distressed her.” She engages in intellectual conversations with Rudin (which are not discouraged by her mother because she thinks that these conversations “improve her mind”); Natasha thinks highly of Rudin, who confides to her his ideas and “privately gives her books”, and soon falls in love with him. She also often compels him to apply his talents and act. Natasha is often thought of as the first of 'Turgenev maids' to feature in Turgenev's fiction.

=== Dar’ya Mikhailovna Lasunskaya ===
A female landowner at whose estate most of the events of the novel happen. She is the widow of a privy councillor, “a wealthy and distinguished lady”. While she is not considered influential in St Petersburg, let alone Europe, she is considered notorious in Moscow society as “a rather eccentric woman, not wholly good-natured, but excessively clever.” She is also described as a beauty in her youth, but “not a trace of her former charms remained.” She shuns the society of local female landowners, but receives many men. Rudin at first gains her favour, but she is very displeased when she finds out about Rudin's and Natasha's love. That said, her opinion of Natasha is far from being correct.

=== Mihailo Mihailych Lezhnev ===
A rich local landowner, generally thought to be a “queer creature” and described in Chapter One as having the appearance of “a huge sack of flour”. Lezhnev is about thirty years old, and seldom visits Dar’ya Mikhailovna (more often than before as the novel progresses), but is often found at Aleksandra's Pavlovna Lipina's house; he is friends both with her and her brother, Sergei. He was orphaned at the age of seventeen, lived at his aunt's and studied together with Rudin at Moscow University, where they were members of the same group of intellectual young men and was good friends with him; he also knew him abroad, but began to dislike him there as “Rudin struck [Lezhnev] in his true light.” Lezhnev is in fact in love with Aleksandra and in the end marries her. His character is often contrasted to Rudin's as he is seen as everything a superfluous man is not – he is intelligent, but in a more practical way, and while he does not do anything exceptional, he doesn't want to either. Seeley writes, that “he concentrates on doing the jobs that lie to hand – running his estate, raising a family – and these he does very competently. Beyond them he does not look.” Lezhnev also acts as Rudin's biographer – he is the one who tells the reader about Rudin's life prior to his appearance at Dar’ya Mikhailovna's. He first describes Rudin in extremely unfavourable terms, but in the end he is also the one who admits Rudin's “genius” in certain areas of life.

=== Aleksandra Pavlovna Lipina ===
Also a local landowner, she is the first of major characters to be presented in the novel. She is described as “a widow, childless, and fairly well off”; we first see her visiting an ill peasant woman, and also find out that she maintains a hospital. She lives with her brother Sergei, who manages her estate, and visits Dar’ya Mikhailovna sometimes (less often as the novel progresses). Dar’ya Mikhailovna describes her as “a sweet creature […] a perfect child […] an absolute baby”, although the question remains of how well Dar’ya Mikhailovna can judge people. At first, she thinks very highly of Rudin and defends him against Lezhnev, but as the novel progresses she seems to side with his view of Rudin. In the end, she marries Lezhnev and seems to be an ideal partner for him.

=== Sergei Pavlovich Volyntsev ===
Aleksandra's brother. He is a retired cavalry officer and manages his sister's estate. At the beginning of the novel he is a frequent guest at Dar’ya Mikhailovna's, because he is in love with Natasha. He takes a great dislike to Rudin, whom he sees as far too intelligent and, quite rightly, a dangerous rival. He is also slighted by Rudin when the latter comes to inform him of his mutual love with Natasha (with the best intentions). He is generally shown as a pleasant, if not very intellectual person, and is good friends with Lezhnev.

=== Minor characters ===
==== Konstantin Diomidych Pandalevskii ====
Dar’ya Mikhailovna's secretary, a young man of affected manners. He is a flatterer and appears to be a generally dishonest and unpleasant person. He doesn't appear to play an important role in the novel apart from being a satirical image.

==== Afrikan Semenych Pigasov ====
Described as “a strange person full of acerbity against everything and every one”, Pigasov frequently visits Dar’ya Mikhailovna prior to Rudin's appearance and amuses her with his bitter remarks, mostly aimed at women. Coming from a poor family, he educated himself, but never rose above the level of mediocrity. He failed his examination in public disputation, in government service he made a mistake which forced him to retire. His wife later left him and sold her estate, on which he just finished building a house, to a speculator. Since then he lived in the province. He is the first victim of Rudin's eloquence, as at Rudin's first appearance he challenged him to a debate and was defeated easily. He ends up living with Lezhnev and Aleksandra Pavlovna.

==== Basistov ====
Tutor to Dar’ya Mikhailovna's younger sons. He is completely captivated by Rudin and seems to be inspired by him. Basistov is the first example of an intellectual from the raznochinets background (Bazarov and Raskol’nikov are among later, more prominent fictional heroes from this background). He also serves as an example of how Rudin is not completely useless since he can inspire people such as Basistov, who can then act in a way impossible for Rudin.

== Synopsis ==
=== Rudin’s arrival ===
The novel begins with the introduction of three of the characters – Aleksandra, Lezhnev, and Pandalevskii. Pandalevskii relates to Aleksandra Dar’ya Mikhailovna's invitation to come and meet a Baron Muffel’. Instead of the Baron, Rudin arrives and captivates everyone immediately with his intelligent and witty speeches during the argument with Pigasov. Rudin's arrival is delayed until Chapter Three. After his success at Dar’ya Mikhailovna's, he stays the night and the next morning meets Lezhnev who arrives to discuss some business affairs with Dar’ya Mikhailovna. This is the first time the reader finds out that Rudin and Lezhnev are acquainted, and studied together at university. During the day that follows Rudin has his first conversation with Natasha; as she speaks of him highly and says he “ought to work”, he replies with a lengthy speech. What follows is a description quite typical of Turgenev, where the character of Rudin is shown not through his own words, but through the text which underlines Rudin's contradictory statements:

“Yes, I must act. I must not bury my talent, if I have any; I must not squander my powers on talk alone — empty, profitless talk — on mere words,’ and his words flowed in a stream. He spoke nobly, ardently, convincingly, of the sin of cowardice and indolence, of the necessity of action.”

On the same day, Sergei leaves Dar’ya Mikhailovna's early and arrives to see that Lezhnev is visiting. Lezhnev then gives his first description of Rudin.

=== Rudin and Natasha ===
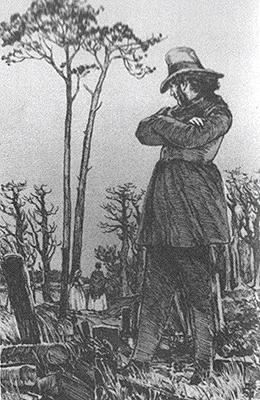
Natasha leaves Rudin after their decisive encounter, by Dmitry Kardovsky

In two months, we are told, Rudin is still staying at Dar’ya Mikhailovna's, living off borrowed money. He spends a lot of time with Natasha; in a conversation with her he speaks of how an old love can only be replaced by a new one. At the same time, Lezhnev gives the account of his youth and his friendship with Rudin, making for the first time the point that Rudin is “too cold” and inactive. On the next day, Natasha quizzes Rudin over his words about old and new love. Neither she, nor he confess their love for each other but in the evening, Rudin and Natasha meet again, and this time Rudin confesses his love for her; Natasha replies that she, too, loves him. Unfortunately, their conversation is overheard by Pandalevskii, who reports it to Dar’ya Mikhailovna, and she strongly disapproves of this romance, making her feelings known to Natasha. The next time Natasha and Rudin meet, she tells him that Dar’ya Mikhailovna knows of their love and disapproves of it. Natasha wants to know what plan of action is Rudin going to propose, but he does not fulfil her expectations when he says that one must “submit to destiny”. She leaves him, disappointed and sad:

“I am sad because I have been deceived in you… What! I come to you for counsel, and at such a moment! — and your first word is, submit! submit! So this is how you translate your talk of independence, of sacrifice, which …”

Rudin then leaves Dar’ya Mikhailovna's estate. Before his departure he writes two letters: one to Natasha and one to Sergei. The letter to Natasha is particularly notable in its confession of the vices of inactivity, inability to act and to take responsibility for one's actions – all the traits of a Hamlet which Turgenev later detailed in his 1860 speech. Lezhnev, meanwhile, asks Aleksandra to marry him and is accepted in a particularly fine scene.

=== Aftermath ===
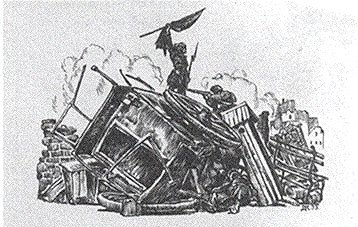
Rudin at the barricades, by Dmitry Kardovsky

Chapter Twelve and the Epilogue detail events of over two years past Rudin's arrival at Dar’ya Mikhailovna's estate. Lezhnev is happily married to Aleksandra. He arrives to give her news of Sergei's engagement to Natasha, who is said to “seem contented”. Pigasov lives with Lezhnevs, and amuses Aleksandra as he used to amuse Dar’ya Mikhailovna. A conversation which follows happens to touch on Rudin, and as Pigasov begins to make fun of him, Lezhnev stops him. He then defends Rudin's “genius” while saying that his problem is that he had no “character” in him. This, again, refers to the superfluous man's inability to act. He then toasts Rudin. The chapter ends with the description of Rudin travelling aimlessly around Russia. In the Epilogue, Lezhnev happens by chance to meet Rudin at a hotel in a provincial town. Lezhnev invites Rudin to dine with him, and over the dinner Rudin relates to Lezhnev his attempts to “act” – to improve an estate belonging to his friend, to make a river navigable, to become a teacher. In all three of this attempts Rudin demonstrated inability to adapt to the circumstances of Nicholas I's Russia, and subsequently failed, and was in the end banished to his estate. Lezhnev then appears to change his opinion of Rudin as inherently inactive, and says that Rudin failed exactly because he could never stop striving for truth. The Epilogue ends with Rudin's death at the barricades during the June Days uprising 26 June 1848 in Paris; even at death he is mistaken by two fleeing revolutionaries for a Pole.

== Adaptations ==
Rudin was adapted for screen in 1976. The 95 minutes-long Soviet-made movie was directed by Konstantin Voynov. The cast included Oleg Yefremov, Armen Dzhigarkhanyan, and Rolan Bykov.
