= Asya (novella) =

Novella (short novel) written by Ivan Turgenev

- Author: Ivan Turgenev
- Original title: Ася (Asya)
- Language: Russian
- Publication date: 1858
- Publication place: Russia

Asya (Russian: Ася, Asya) is a novella by Ivan Turgenev, first published in 1858 in the first issue of the Sovremennik magazine (volume LXVII).

== Background ==
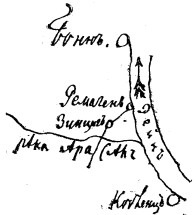
Drawing from a letter sent by Turgenev from Sinzig to Pavel Annenkov on July 9, 1857

Turgenev worked on the story from July to November 1857. The idea came from a scene he saw in the German town of Sinzig - an elderly woman looking out of a window on the first floor, and the head of a young girl in the window above. Turgenev tried to imagine the fate of these people and came up with the idea for "Asya".

The protagonists of the story were also influenced by figures in Turgenev's own life. It is speculated by many Russian biographers that Asya's prototypes were probably three illegitimate girls from the author's household, his step-sister Asya, his half-sister Varvara Zhitova, and his own daughter Polina. His mother raised Asya or Anna, the illegitimate daughter of Nikolai Nikolaevich Turgenev (the author's uncle and guardian), and Varvara Nikolaevna Zhitova, Turgenev's mother's own illegitimate daughter. Finally, while working on the story, Turgenev's own illegitimate daughter, Pelageia Polina Turgeneva, also suffered from unrequited first love. Polina’s similarity with the heroine of the novella is also reflected in the class difference of her both parents, and Polina’s conflicts with the children of Pauline Viardot (in whose family Polina was raised when Turgenev was living with her).

The literary prototype of Asya is speculated to be Mignon from Goethe's novels Wilhelm Meister's Apprenticeship and Wilhelm Meister's Journeyman Years. The similarity of the character of Asya is often compared with Natasha Rostova from Tolstoy's novel War and Peace.

== Central characters ==
N.N. – The narrator, a middle-aged Russian landowner in the country who narrates the story of his unhappy love affair several years earlier. In the story he is 25 years old, financially secure and is travelling through Europe. His full name is never revealed but he also features in many of Turgenev's other stories.

Anna Nikolayevna, nicknamed Asya – The object of the narrator's affections. A 17 years old emotional young woman who falls in love with N.N. Her temperament changes quickly from being prankish to Melancholy. The revelation of her parentage is the central mystery and problem of the plot. Her personality is in sharp contrast to both of her brother, and the narrator.

Gagin – Asya's brother. A 24 years old former Guardsman from Russia who wants to become an artist. He begins several paintings but finishes none of them. He loves and cares for Asya but at the same time is ashamed of her origin.

== Plot ==
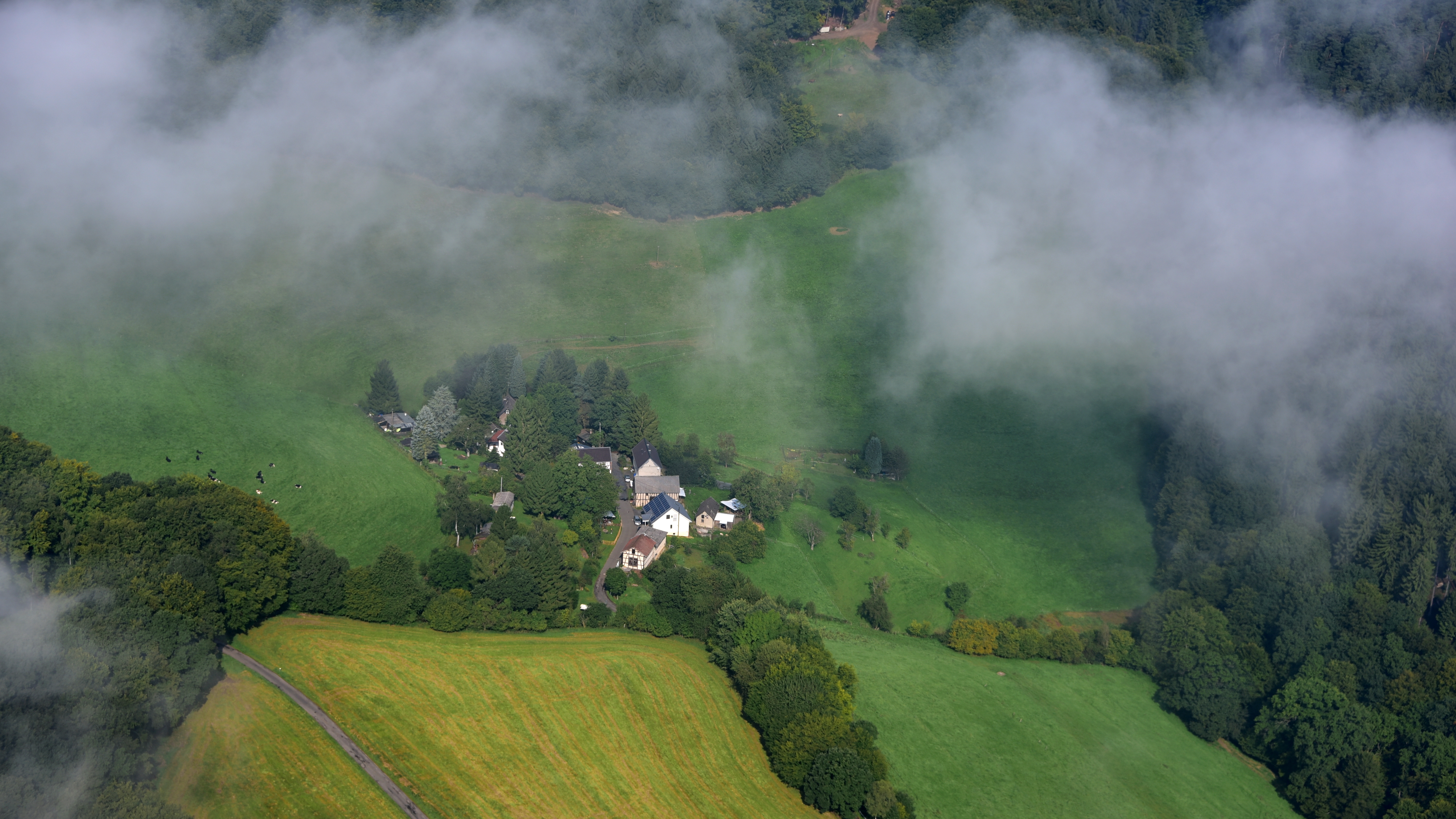
Leubsdorf, where the narrator meets Asya and Gagin

The narration is told on behalf of an anonymous narrator (Mr. N.N.). He remembers his youth, his stay in the small town of Sinzig. on the banks of the river Rhine. One day he is ferrying a boat and follows the sound of music and noise from a festival, he crosses the river to the neighboring town of Leubsdorf. Here the narrator meets two Russians: a young man named Gagin, who wants to become an artist, and a girl named Asya (Anna), whom he introduced as his sister. Asya's mood changes rapidly from being happy to sad, and is often eccentric things such as climbing the ruins of a castle to water the flowers. The hero begins to suspect that Asya is not Gagin’s sister due to the extreme difference between their personalities.

A few days later, the narrator befriends Gagin and learns that Asya is really his sister. At the age of twelve, Gagin was sent to St. Petersburg to study at a boarding school while his widowed father remained in the countryside. After the death of his father, Gagin came to know that his father had another child, a daughter named Asya, whose mother was Tatyana, a maid at the Gagins' house. Gagin is forced to raise the thirteen-year-old girl alone. He sends her to a boarding school for some years. However, due to them facing social stigma due to her illegitimate birth, he finally decides to go abroad with Asya.

The narrator feels deep pity for Asya - be believes that it is her unclear social position (the daughter of a serf and a master) that causes her to have nervous breakdowns. Gradually he falls in love with Asya. Asya writes him a letter asking him to meet. Gagin, who knows about his sister’s feelings, asks the narrator if he would agree to marry her. The hero, unsure of his feelings, cannot fully agree and promises to reject Asya's love at the meeting (if it takes place).

The narrator's meeting with Asya takes place in the house of the burgomaster's widow. After the confession of her feelings, Asya finds herself in his arms, but then the narrator conveys his disappointment to her for ruining everything by confessing to her brother, and now their happiness is impossible. Asya runs away. Hero and Gagin look for her. In the end, the narrator realizes that he truly loves Asya and wants to marry her. The next day he plans to ask his brother for the girl’s hand in marriage. But the next day it turns out that Gagin and Asya left the city. The hero tries to catch up with them, but loses their trail in London.

The narrator never meets Asya again. There were other women in his life, but now, on the threshold of old age and death, he understands that he truly loved only her, and that even the dried flower that she gave him will outlive both lovers - reflecting on the fleeting nature of human life.

== Criticism and reception ==
During Turgenev's lifetime, the story was translated into many European languages: German, English, Swedish. There were several French translations; Turgenev himself was not satisfied with their quality and released his own French translation.

Nikolay Chernyshevsky dedicated his article "Russian man at rendez-vous" to the character of "Asya".

Leo Tolstoy had a very unfavourable opinion of the novel, dismissing it as "rubbish" and "the weakest thing he [Turgenev] ever wrote".

== Film adaptations ==
- In 1971, the Hungarian director Miklos Csanyi made a television film based on the story.
- In 1977, director Iosif Kheifits made the film Asya, based on the novella, in which Yelena Koreneva played the lead role as Asya.
- In 1997, the Spanish director Xavier Bermudez made the film Nena based on the story.
