= An Uncommon Story =

1924 memoir by Ivan Goncharov

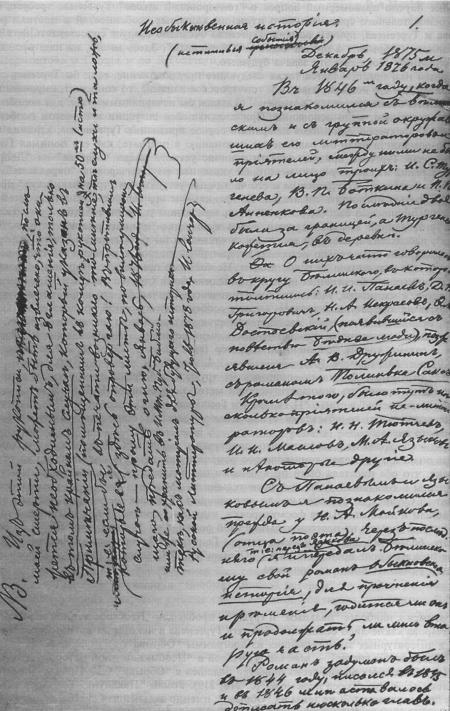
- Page 1 of An Uncommon Story manuscript. 1875 authoghraph.
- Author: Ivan Goncharov
- Original title: Необыкновенная история
- Language: Russian
- Genre: Literary memoirs
- Publisher: The Russian Public library
- Publication date: 1924 (Moscow)
- Publication place: Russia

An Uncommon Story (Russian: Необыкнове́нная исто́рия, romanized: Neobyknovennaya istoriya) is an autobiographical literary memoir by Ivan Goncharov, written in 1875–1876 (with an 1878 addendum) and first published in 1924. Parts of it were later included into The Complete Goncharov (1978–1980, Vol VII).

According to the Gale Encyclopedia of Biography, An Uncommon Story "…confirmed the psychopathic side of [its author's] personality; it is an account of imagined plots against him and imagined attempts by others to plagiarize his work." Many researchers disagreed, finding there was much more veracity to Goncharov's claims than had previously been reported.

An Uncommon Story had one single agenda: to prove that Ivan Turgenev has not only borrowed major ideas, character types, and conflicts from Goncharov's The Precipice to use in his Home of the Gentry, but also (in the author's words) "infused the best European literature with them."

An Uncommon Story caused much debate; that it was published at all caused some controversy, for according to its author's special request, these memoirs were to be issued only in case plagiarism accusations were brought against him after his death. Since no such allegations have ever been made, Goncharov's book was formally published contrary to his will. In this same note, however, the author mentioned that he wished for future "historians of Russian literature" to take hold of it.

It was the latter who deemed the publication advisable since (according to scholar N. F. Budanova) "it shed an important light upon Goncharov and Turgenev's relations," and also provided researchers with "valuable material for making a comparative analysis of both classic novels which, indeed, had striking similarities."

== Background ==
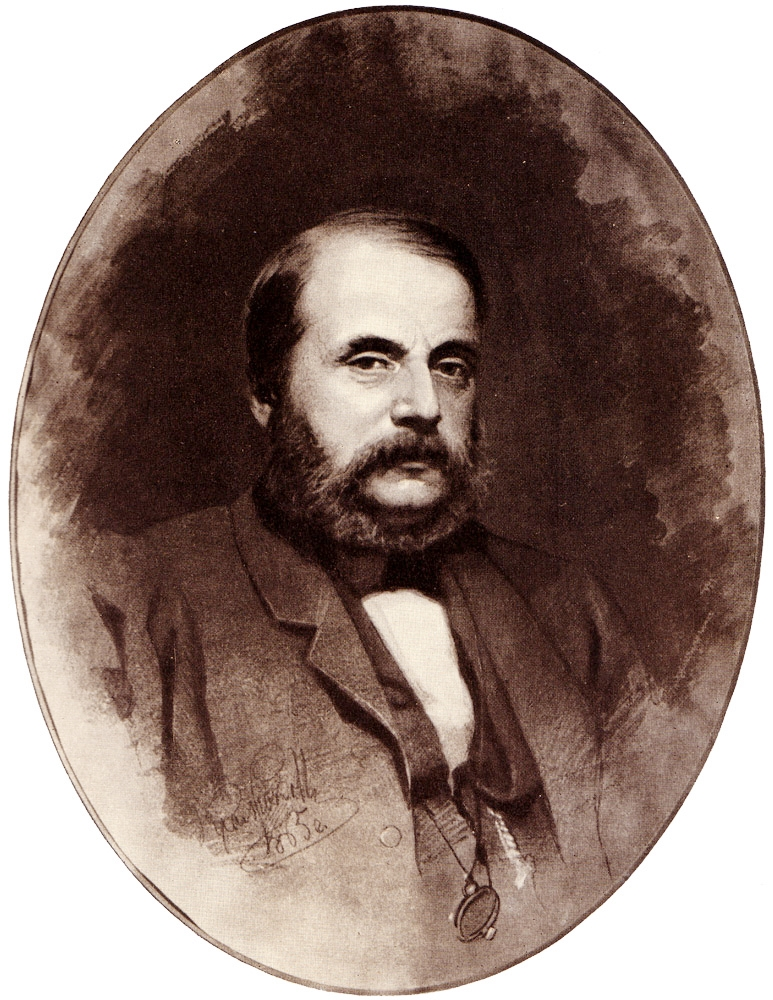
Ivan Goncharov

In the mid-1850s, Ivan Goncharov and Ivan Turgenev were on friendly terms. Goncharov, who'd launched his career in a spectacular fashion and was declared by some a "true Nikolay Gogol heir", had no serious rival as a novelist on the Russian literary scene until the late 1850s; Fyodor Dostoyevsky was still in exile, Leo Tolstoy was writing novelets and short stories, and Turgenev was considered a master of miniatures.

The success of Home of the Gentry must have come as a surprise to Goncharov, who'd never considered Turgenev a novelist. In a letter dated March 28, 1859, he wrote: "Would it be permissible for me to comment on your talent? I'd say you've got a gift for drawing tender landscapes, and have a keen ear, but you seem to be eager to erect monumental structures [...] and give us drama. Goncharov's opinion seemingly never altered.

Literary historians argued later that Turgenev's overnight success might have seemed totally undeserved for Goncharov, who, for quite a while, felt like he was the only master of his field. Goncharov produced one novel in a decade, but his new rival did it in a seemingly fleeting manner, which must have made the injustice look even more gross.

Of all the possible explanations for the improbable manner in which Turgenev, a master of miniatures, could have suddenly re-invented himself as a novelist, only one for Goncharov looked plausible: the younger man must have nicked his own ideas, structures, conflicts, and character types, and "with these pearls started to play his own lyre."

Some commentators later dismissed such claims as born out of jealousy, aggravated by Goncharov's natural suspiciousness, impressionability, and general hypochondria. Others argued that this would have been too simple an explanation, for while many of Goncharov's allegations were far-fetched, some were not altogether groundless. At least one fact was undisputed: in 1855, having returned from his long sea voyage, Goncharov laid out before Turgenev, his then good friend, the whole plan of his future third novel, which he has conceived as far back as 1849.

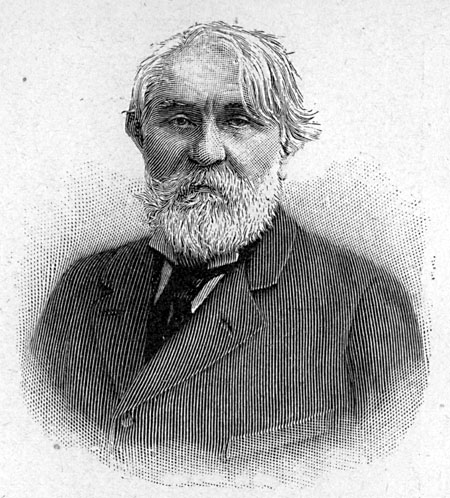
Ivan Turgenev

In 1887, four years after Turgenev's death, Goncharov attached a note to this novel's original text, which read: "This manuscript contains the material for a novel which in 1869, as Vestnik Evropy was about to publish it, I gave the title The Precipice. Before that I used to refer to is as Raisky, the Artist and was freely expounding upon it to my fellow writers, mostly to Turgenev. It was to him that in 1855, soon after returning from my around-the-world journey, I recounted in detail, in the course of several meetings, all the details of it [...] because he, being a perceptive and sensitive man of art, seemed to be most sympathetic to those of my works that he promised a great future for."

Judging by Goncharov and Turgenev's correspondence, in the mid-1850s, the two men were very close. Goncharov valued Turgenev as a well-educated, clever critic with an impeccable literary taste. In An Uncommon Story he wrote: "Once Turgenev told me briefly: 'As long as one single Russian remains on Earth, Oblomov will be remembered... Another time, as I was reading him form chapters I've written in Petersburg, he suddenly rose from his divan and departed to his bedroom. 'Old sparrow as I am, you touched me to tears', he said upon his return, wiping his eyes."

Tellingly, Turgenev even prompted minor detail to Oblomov, namely, in the scene where Olga and Schtoltz converse in Switzerland. Goncharov acknowledged Turgenev's priority in "discovering nihilism", and admitted there was historical and artistic authenticity to Bazarov's character. In the late 1850s relations between the two apparently deteriorated, and in March 1860 things came to a head.

=== Accusations of plagiarism ===
Prior to the publication of Home of the Gentry, Goncharov took an opportunity to get acquainted with the original text at recitals held by Turgenev for a circle of friends. He pointed to its author that many ideas, fragments of a plotline and situations looked very much as though they had been copied from The Precipice, the novel which was yet unpublished but very familiar to Turgenev in every detail. On March 27, 1860, Goncharov reminded Turgenev in a letter: "Remember, there was the time when you agreed that the general plan of your novel and characters' interactions had been similar [to that of mine]; you even excluded one scene, too obviously similar to mine, which made me feel totally satisfied." In another letter, dated March 28, Goncharov specified the scene similar to that which involved Vera and grandmother (in The Precipice), which, being "a weak one", had been "magnanimously sacrificed" by Turgenev. The scene mentioned was absent from the final version of Home of the Gentry, but references to it have been found in rough copies of the novel; this corroborated Goncharov's claim that Turgenev indeed had been making some cuts so as to make parallels less obvious. According to N. Budanova, "it is important to bear in mind that parallels between the two novels were for all to see and Turgenev at one point conceded as much, blaming his 'over-impressionability' for this."

On March 29, 1860, in the critic Stepan Dudyshkin's flat an "arbitrary court" took place, with Pavel Annenkov, Alexander Druzhinin and Aleksandr Nikitenko present. The court's verdict was conciliatory: "Since both Turgenev's and Goncharov's novels have had for their ground the very same soil of Russian reality, similarities and coincidences, in ideas and even phraseology, would only be natural and for both writers excusable." After that Goncharov and Turgenev stopped communicating. In 1864, at Druzhinin's funeral, they made peace but never became friends again, even if Turgenev in one of his letters mentioned his feeling "very close to Goncharov." As Turgenev's new novels were appearing one after another, Goncharov was becoming more and more resentful, apparently seeing his worst suspicions confirmed.

==== The manuscript ====
The original manuscript, a notebook, consisting of 53 pages, held in the Russian National Library, according to N.Budanova, looks very much like a rough copy that's never been revisited by the author, with many edits, some fragments blotted out so as to be unreconstructable. The notebook consists of two parts, written in different times. Part 1, Uncommon Story (True Facts), pages 1–50, is dated December 1875 and January 1876. The author's commentary to it reads:

Hereby I express my will for my ancestors or whoever get hold of this manuscript, to extract from it and make public whatever they feel necessary [...] but only if, through Turgenev’s efforts, or otherwise, a notion (based on similarities between my novel and those of Turgenev and some West European authors) should become prevalent in the press that it was me who had borrowed from them and not vice versa, and that I was just following other people's steps. [Otherwise]... I would like this manuscript to be burnt down or transferred to the Imperial Public library for the use of future historians of Russian literature.

Part 2, pages 51–53, dated July 1878, had another note attached to it: "I've sealed the previous fifty pages in an envelope as finished. But in the course of the last 2.5 years lots of things have happened related to this case and I see that, having once started, I need to continue..." There is an inscription on the envelope: "These papers which have to do with me personally, I commit to Sophia Aleksandrovna Nikitenko for her to deal with them as I asked her to. Ivan Goncharov, May 19, 1883".

== Analysis ==
An Uncommon Story was first published in 1924 by the Russian Public Library archives, with a foreword by D. I. Abramovich. It was preceded by the publication in 1923 of the whole of the Goncharov-Turgenev correspondence by Boris Engelgardt, who accompanied it with a thorough analysis of the two authors' relations. For decades, the issue lay dormant.

Then in 1972, A. Batyuto suggested Goncharov might have been a major influence on early Turgenev, after all. Having drawn the comparative analysis of Turgenev's On the Eve and Goncharov's The Precipice, the author came to the conclusion: the former most obviously used "methods of novel-structuring he'd borrowed from other writers, Goncharov included". According to Batyuto, when it came to the art of building up a novel, Turgenev in his early days was certainly taking cues from Goncharov.

In 1976, O. Demikhovskaya in an article called "I.A. Goncharov and I.S. Turgenev" criticized the 'biased approach' to the problem demonstrated by Engelgardt, who in 1923 made an emphasis on Goncharov's personal idiosyncrasies as being the major factor behind the conflict. She presented Turgenev as the guilty party and recounted numerous quarrels he had with Leo Tolstoy and Fyodor Dostoyevsky.

According to V. Nezdvedtsky, the reason behind the two writers' conflict was "the typological resemblances of both and Goncharov's jealousy of his more fortunate rival." The author pointed out that, while working on a completely new type of Russian novel (and leaving behind Grigorovich and Pisemsky with their traditionalism), both Goncharov (who first came up with the idea of plotline's "poetisation") and Turgenev were up against common challenges and were therefore keenly aware of each other's works. This by no means involved plagiarism: Goncharov himself in An Uncommon Story drew nothing but parallels, the critic argued. Nezdvetsky thought the conflict might have been easily resolved should Turgenev have been more straightforward in admitting his earlier influences. N. Budanova thought such thing would have been impossible at the time for it would have been perceived by the public as a confession of plagiarism.

While the fact that The Precipice and Home of the Gentry had a lot in common, Goncharov's other allegations have been unanimously dismissed by literary historians as groundless. Parallels he's drawn between The Precipice and Turgenev's Fathers and Sons were proved to be far-fetched, as was his claim that Torrents of Spring, was 'an improvisation' on The Same Old Story' part I. Goncharov's claims that some European authors started to use his ideas and character types through Turgenev's influence are seen to be void, although Budanova noted that some contemporary critics might have prompted such an idea to the author who in his later life grew to be highly impressionable and suspicious. For example, Aleksey Suvorin in his article "The French Society in Gustave Flaubert's new novel" suggested that the Sentimental Education' main character Frédéric Moreau was "akin to the so-called 'people of the 1840s' in Russia and that he was "similar to Raisky... its just that Flaubert has treated his character more objectively than our respected novelist." Some similarities between Goncharov's characters and those of Madame Bovary have been mentioned by Russian critics too.

Goncharov's allegations, made in An Uncommon Story, that Turgenev did a lot of harm to Russian literature in the West, have been proved invalid. On the contrary, Turgenev has been praised by many as an avid promoter of Russian classics: his own translations of the works by Pushkin, Lermontov and Gogol into French did a lot to popularize them in Europe. Several translations of important Russian works have been made through his recommendations. "We have every reason to insist that Turgenev preached Russian literature to the West. Forms and methods of such popularization have been different, and it is upon Turgenev's great authority that Western views on many Russian novels are still being based upon," wrote Soviet scholar Mikhail Alekseev in 1948.
