= The Precipice (Goncharov novel) =

1869 Russian novel by Ivan Goncharov

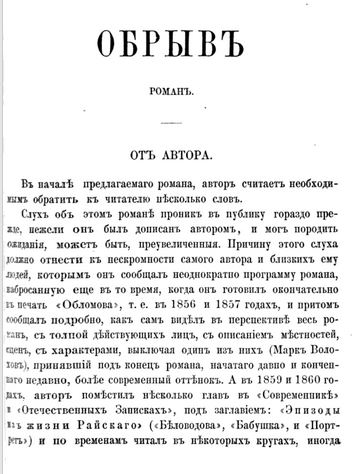
- First publication in Vestnik Evropy
- Author: Ivan Goncharov
- Original title: Обрыв
- Language: Russian
- Publisher: Vestnik Evropy
- Publication date: 1869
- Publication place: Russia
- Media type: print (Hardback & Paperback)

The Precipice (Russian: Обрыв, romanized: Obryv), also translated as Malinovka Heights, is the third and the last novel by Ivan Goncharov, first published in January–May 1869 issues of Vestnik Evropy magazine. The novel, conceived in 1849, took twenty years to be completed and was preceded by the publication of three extracts: "Sophja Nikolayevna Belovodova" (Sovremennik, No. 2, 1860), "Grandmother" and "Portrait" (Otechestvennye Zapiski, Nos. 1–2, 1861). The author considered it to be his most definitive work, in which he fully realized his grand artistic ambition. Less successful than its predecessor Oblomov (1859), The Precipice is still regarded as one of the classics of Russian literature.

== Background ==
According to Goncharov, the idea of the third novel came to him in 1849 when he returned to his native Simbirsk after fourteen years of absence. "Old memories of early youth, new encounters, landscapes of Volga banks, local scenes and situations, customs and manners, – all this stirred up my fantasies and I drew the plan for the novel in my head adding finishing touches to Oblomov. Both projects had to be aborted as I embarked upon the round the world journey on frigate "Pallada" in 1852, 1853 and 1854. It was only after this journey's end, and when the book Frigate "Pallada" has been written and published, that I was able to return to these novels, both still only conceived. [...] In 1857-1858 I finished and published Oblomov and only after that was able to concentrate on The Precipice, some fragments of which I had read to my friends and others published in magazines in 1860–1861," he remembered. Only in 1868, while in Germany and France, Goncharov completed the fourth and fifth parts of the novel. Back in Saint Petersburg he revised the text and added an epilogue.

On August 21, 1866, in a letter to Alexander Nikitenko Goncharov wrote:

Now I'm going to tell you the one thing I've never told anybody before. From the moment that I started to write professionally (I was 30 and had had some experience already) I've had one artistic ideal in mind, that of creation of the character of an honest, kind and likeable man, a total idealist, who'd been struggling all his life searching for truth, encountering nothing but lies at every corner, finally lost all interest and fell into apathy, through realizing how inadequate he was and how weak was human nature as such. This was the idea that I had when I was first thinking of Raisky. Should I've had it in me to put this to realization, this figure might have grown into a serious one, but that was a mammoth task, and I was in no position to tackle it. Besides, this wave of negativism has swept through our society and our literature, starting with Belinsky and Gogol. I succumbed to it and instead of embarking upon a serious study of this particular human kind started to sketch out fleeting portraits, picking at ugly and funny features only. Such a task would have proven difficult for any talent. Shakespeare created his Hamlet, Miguel de Cervantes his Don Quixote and these two giants have swallowed almost all that there's been tragic and comic in human nature. So what's been left for us, pygmies, was a set of small scale ideas and even those for us now are too hard to tackle. That is why we're reduced to making hints, nothing more. This is why Raisky comes out so foggy.

One character, that of Mark Volokhov, has undergone considerable evolution. Initially, according to the author, "this figure was never supposed to fit into the novel's major scheme, being part of a background, in shadows," a mere "introductory face, serving for the fuller realization of Vera's character." Soon, though, he turned out to be one of the novel's most prominent figures. Among rough drafts of The Precipice there was Volokhov's short 'biography' which showed him to be initially a "domestic kind of a nihilist," struggling in vain to realize his life potential to the full, then evolving into a kind of ideologist preaching "new truth", materialism and atheism. Goncharov admitted later that Volokhov proved to be a challenging character and in the long run, a stumbling block, hindering the whole process. The author himself conceded later that "the Volokhov character came like a piece of two-part cloth, one half belonging to pre-1850s, another coming from the modern times when 'new people' started to emerge."

Goncharov considered The Precipice to be his best work, in which he managed to realize his artistic ambition to the full. "The dreams and aspirations of Raisky for me sound like a sonorous chord, praising Woman, Motherland, God and love," he wrote in a letter to Mikhail Stasyulevich.

== Synopsis ==
In The Precipice Goncharov combines various genres: novel about the artist, political novel, and romance. This work contrasts the then new ideas of philosophical positivism, utilitarianism and atheism with romantic idealism and traditional values. These various views are examined through the characters of three men laboring to win the love of the heroine, Vera: Boris Raisky, an artist-dilettant; Mark Volokhov, a nihilist in the tradition of Turgenev's Bazarov; and Ivan Tushin, a traditional, yet enlightened landowner.

The Precipice is especially notable for its women. The heroine, Vera, is one of Russian literature's most independent and intelligent female characters, and the full-blooded portrait of Raisky's wise and strong grandmother is no less remarkable. (AbeBooks)

== Reception ==
The novel, upon its release, received mixed response. At the time of the sharp division in the Russian cultural elite, critics came to assume the novel each according to their own current political stand. The Russian Messenger, a conservative magazine, not just praised the way Goncharov allegedly "poeticized the old times" but saw this as the novel's major asset. Critics close to the democratic camp (among them Nikolai Shelgunov and Maria Tsebrikova) published negative reviews. Characteristically, Mikhail Saltykov-Shchedrin in his essay "The Street Philosophy" (Otechestvennye zapiski, 1869, No.6) focused only on chapter 6 of the last part of the novel. Having scrutinized Volokhov's character, he came to the conclusion that this type of person in no way could be seen as a Russian free-thinking man's role model. Vexed by the fact that it was the 'domestic nihilist' type to whom Goncharov had attributed this status of a 'doctrine-holder', the critic saw this as a sign of the novel's tendentiousness and accused its author for "a penchant for abstract humanism." Traditional values of 'goodness' were totally irrelevant for the 'new Russia' with its social problems that were needed to be solved, Shchedrin argued.

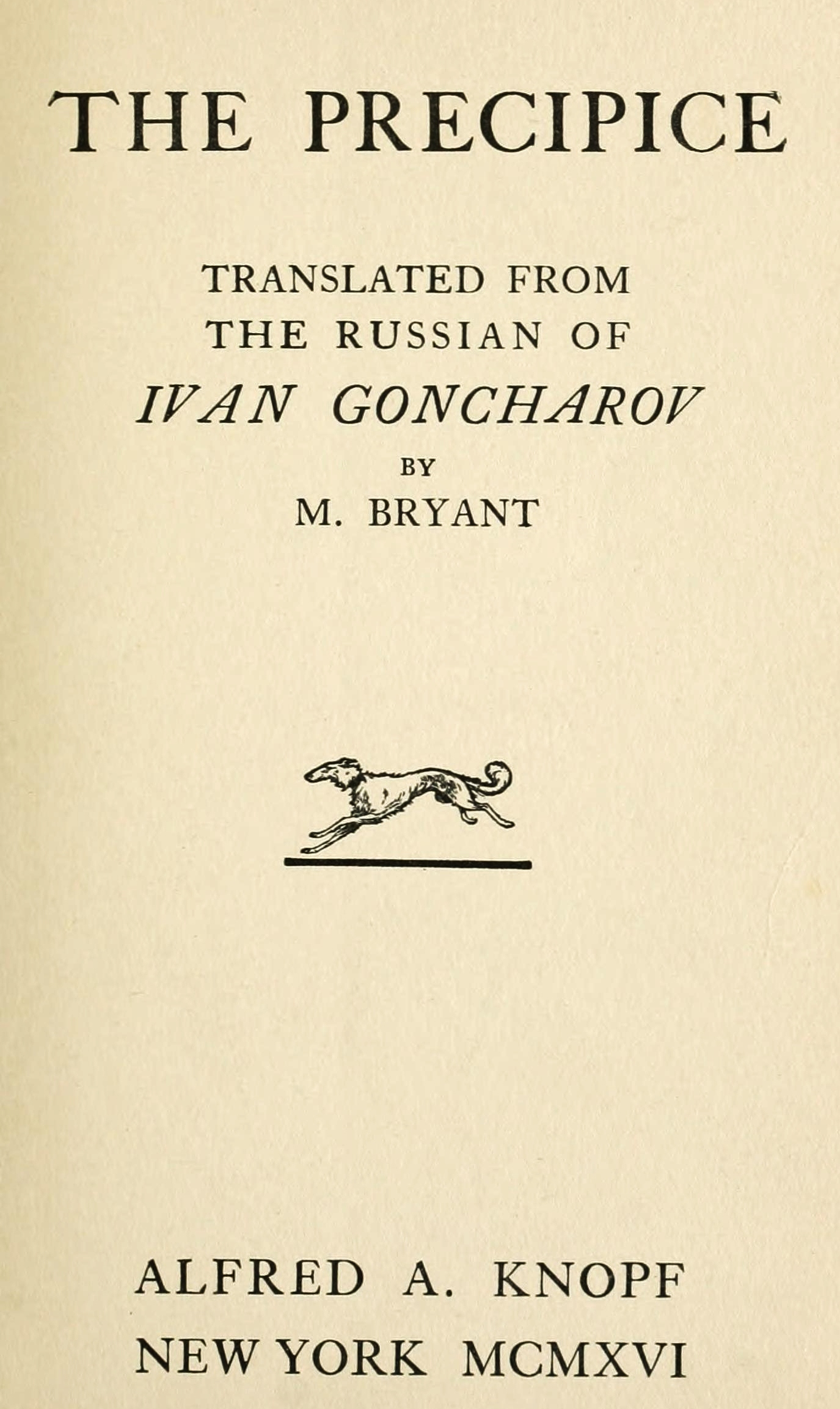
1916 English translation title page

Despite all this, The Precipice enjoyed great success. Goncharov remembered: "Stasyulevich related to me, how, every first day of a month, people would queue at the Vestnik Evropy's doors as if it were bakers' - those were couriers, eager to grab copies for their subscribers."
