= The Same Old Story (novel) =

1847 novel by Ivan Goncharov

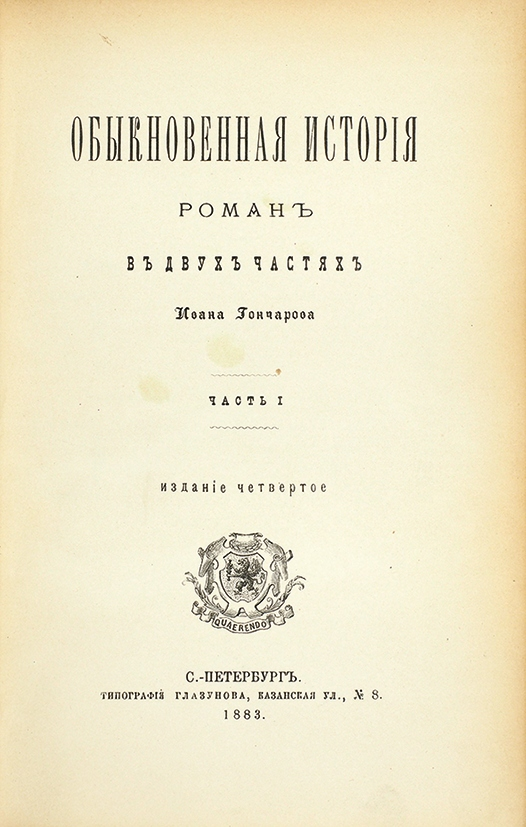
- Fourth edition of the novel (1883)
- Author: Ivan Goncharov
- Original title: Обыкновенная история
- Language: Russian
- Publisher: Sovremennik
- Publication date: 1847
- Publication place: Russia
- Followed by: Frigate "Pallada"

The Same Old Story (Russian: Обыкнове́нная исто́рия, romanized: Obyknovennaya istorya) is the first novel by Ivan Goncharov, written between 1844 and 1846 and published in 1847. It has also been published in English under the titles A Common Story and An Ordinary Story.

== Background ==
In April 1846 the 34-year-old Ivan Goncharov asked Nikolay Yazykov to read his debut novel and inquired whether it might be passed along to St. Petersburg literary critic Vissarion Belinsky for a final verdict. Yazykov flicked through several pages, got bored, put the manuscript aside and forgot all about it. Several months later he recalled the incident and gave the book to Nikolay Nekrasov, with a comment: "Looks like a weak one, not worthy of publication." Nekrasov looked through the novel, thought differently and carried it to Belinsky who instantly recognized the emergence of a major talent. The premiere reading of the book took place at Belinsky's flat. According to Ivan Panaev, while listening to Goncharov's recital, the critic fidgeted on his chair, jumping up from time to time, eyes shining, and each time the author took a short break, he gave an ironic cry: "So, Yazykov, is it a 'weak one', is it 'unworthy'?"

"Even three months after this presentation Belinsky, each time we met, was bursting into congratulations, speaking of the bright future that awaited for me," Goncharov wrote in his Uncommon Story memoirs. On April 1, 1846 Fyodor Dostoyevsky wrote in a letter to his brother: "The real host of new writers has emerged, some of them surely my rivals. Most remarkable are Herzen (Iskander) and Goncharov. The former has been published already, the latter is unpublished yet, both being greatly praised."

The novel was first published in the 1847 March and April issues of Sovremennik magazine.

== Plot ==
The novel is about a young Russian nobleman named Aleksander Aduev, who arrives in St. Petersburg from the provinces and loses his romanticism amidst the rampant pragmatic commercialism.

== Reception ==
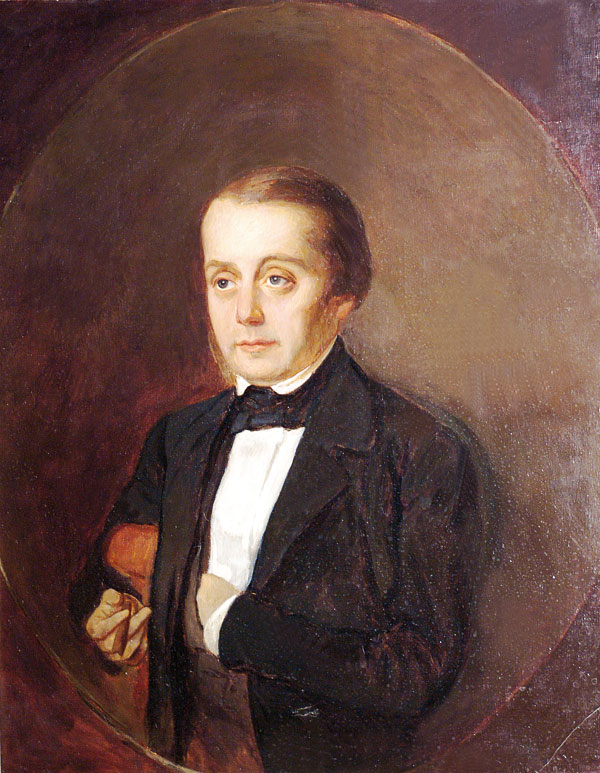
Portrait of young Goncharov by Kirill Gorbunov, 1847

"Goncharov’s novel caused furore in Saint Petersburg, its success was unheard of. And how much good will it bring to our society, what a massive blow will it administer to romanticism, dreaminess, sentimentality and provincialism," Belinsky wrote to critic Vasily Botkin on March 17, 1847. "Goncharov's debut novel was very successful both in literary saloons and with wider audience," according to biographer Gavriil Potanin. Avdotya Panaeva remembered: "My God, and how agitated all the curious men of letters became all of a sudden! Everybody wanted to know details of the new author’s life, past and present, which class did he come from, what circles did he belong to, et cetera."

Years later, explaining the plot's major dilemma, Goncharov wrote in his "Better Late Than Never" essay: "This nephew versus uncle opposition was the reflection of the process that has been just starting at the time, when system of old concepts and customs was beginning to crumble down – and with it sentimentality, grotesque expression of feelings of love and friendship, poetisation of idleness, nets of domestic lies, knitted from preposterous, totally groundless emotionalism."

The novel had an immediate effect upon its readers. Critic Aleksander Skabichevsky remembered: "Instantly I recognized myself in its main hero, Aleksander Aduev, for as him, I used to be sentimentally complacent, and was taking great care to keep hair locks, flowers and other 'material symbols of immaterial relations'. And so ashamed was I of this similarity as to gather all the little souvenirs that I was keeping at my house, threw them into the fire and give on oath to myself never to fall in love again, ever." In his "Better Late Than Never" (1879) essay Goncharov wrote: "While working on The Same Old Story I had in mind, of course, myself and people like myself, young men who were first studying at home or at the University, leading peaceful lives under their kind and protective mother's wings, then breaking away from all this tenderness, coming through lots of tearful farewells to find themselves in Saint Petersburg, this arena for all activity… And only there to experience this first spark of consciousness, this still dim realization that one needs to work, not go through some kind of bureaucratic motions, but real work to overcome this all-Russian stagnation."

=== Critical reception ===
The conservative press reaction to the novel was negative. In Otechestvennye Zapiski (No.1, 1848), critic Stepan Dudyshkin, horrified by the Aduev-senior character, wrote: "I'd rather have people remaining romantics than have this business-like positivity of Pyotr Ivanovich for an alternative." Faddey Bulgarin gave the author some credit but still argued that his novel's social significance would be nil. Also in Severnaya Ptchela, critic L. Brandt (writing under Я.Я.Я. moniker) accused Goncharov of trying to "debase each and every heartfelt movement of Aleksander, every emotional outburst, quite excusably for a young man" so as to show that "all the decent people were to have Pyotr Ivanovich for a role model, when in fact this Pyotr Ivanovich is nothing more than a well-glued-up automaton, surely not a human being." Moskvityanin also came up to defend Romanticism and romantics as being attacked by the author.

For Belinsky, the discussion was a handy pretext to wage another ideological war against those whom he regarded "old-timers". In an essay called "A Look at the Russian Literature of 1847", he mentioned several worthy novels of the year, picking up two – Alexander Hertzen's Who is to Blame? and Ivan Goncharov's The Same Old Story – as the best. Belinsky gave such a characteristic to Aduev-junior: "He's thrice a romantic: by nature, by upbringing and by circumstances of life, while one single reasons would have been enough to misguide a good man and prompt him doing lots of silly things. [...] He is a bit of a musician, a bit of a poet, a bit of an artists and even - at times of need, a bit of a critic and writer, but these talents of his are such that he is unable not only to make himself a name, but even support himself minimally."

Anti-romanticism crusade being one of his major issues at the time, Belinsky wrote: "Romantics tend to think its them who have the privilege of having strong feelings, while others do not - just because these others do not cry of their feelings aloud. [...] But sometimes the one who feels stronger, lives on a weaker emotional scale: poetry, music and literary images make him sob, while real pain fails to, and he passes indifferently through all the suffering that's around him." Belinsky made a point of emphasizing what he thought was the worst 'romantic feature' in the novel's main character: pseudo-humanism, a substitute for real sympathy for real people. "This poor man cannot realise that it is very easy, sitting in a cabinet, to be overcome all of a sudden by fiery love to all mankind, far easier than to spend one sleepless night by the bed of a seriously ill person."

=== Later history ===
In 1848, the book came out as a separate edition. It was re-issued in 1858 and 1862, each time with minor edits made by the author. Major changes, involving stylistic re-hash and drastic cuts, were made by Goncharov when he prepared the novel for its 4th and 5th editions (1863, 1883, respectively).

== Modern reception ==
Although Goncharov's novel Oblomov makes him a famous writer, today The Same Old Story and Goncharov's other works are not as famous as Oblomov. The novel is rarely published in English. After a new translation of The Same Old Story came out in 2015, the novel was noticed and "rediscovered".

And from half a continent and three lifetimes away he can still make new readers laugh and gasp with recognition over timeless human foibles, so I am glad that he was translated, and I trust you will be, too.

— Nicholas Lezard, The Guardian, 2015

While Goncharov's first novel lacks the perfected artistry of Oblomov, the conversations between Alexander and his uncle are witty and gripping, the various love affairs poignant and credible, several minor characters are deliciously comic, and the whole book well worth rediscovery.

— Michael Dirda, The Washington Post, 2017

== English translations ==
- A Common Story: A Novel. London: Heinemann, 1894. Translated by Constance Garnett
- The Same Old Story. Foreign Languages Press, Moscow, 1957. Translated by Ivy Litvinov
- An Ordinary Story: Including the Stage Adaptation of the Novel. Ardis Publishers, 1994. Translated and edited by Marjorie L. Hoover
- The Same Old Story. Alma Books, 2015. Translated by Stephen Pearl
