= Vasily Botkin =

Russian essayist, literary, art and music critic, translator and publicist

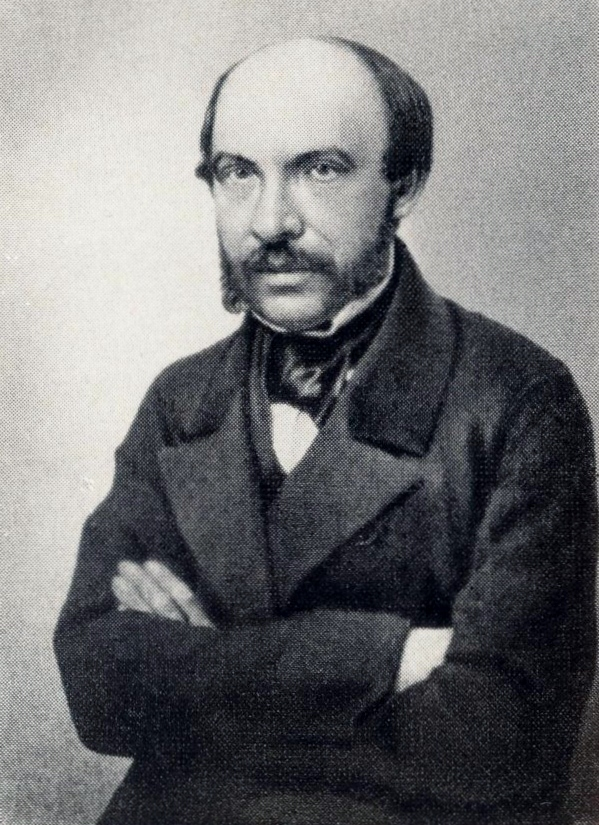
- Born: Vasily Petrovich Botkin; 8 January 1812 [O.S. 27 December 1811] Moscow, Russian Empire
- Died: 22 October [O.S. 10 October] 1869 (aged 57); St Petersburg, Russian Empire

Vasily Petrovich Botkin (Russian: Васи́лий Петро́вич Бо́ткин; 8 January 1812 [O.S. 27 December 1811] – 22 October [O.S. 10 October] 1869) was a Russian essayist, literary, art and music critic, translator and publicist.

== Early life ==
Vasily was born in Moscow, the son of Alexandra Antonovna (Baranova) and Petr Kononovich Botkin, a wealthy tea merchant. His brothers were Sergey Botkin, a well-known physician, and Mikhail Botkin, a painter and art collector. Vasily was a moderate liberal in the 1830s and 40s, associating with members of the circle of Nikolai Stankevich, and with the Westernizers, including Mikhail Bakunin, Vissarion Belinsky and Alexander Herzen. Vasily was a man of expensive tastes, a connoisseur of art and music, and a polyglot. He travelled widely in Europe, meeting well known figures such as Karl Marx, Louis Blanc and Victor Hugo.

== Career ==
Vasily was the first Russian publicist to acquaint Russian readers with the works of Friedrich Engels (he wrote a summary of Engels's pamphlet Schelling and Revelation, part of his series German Literature, published in 1843 in the magazine Notes of the Fatherland). He published articles on art exhibitions as well as on William Shakespeare, E. T. A. Hoffmann and George Sand. In the field of music he wrote Italian and German Music (1839), On the Aesthetic Significance of the New School of Piano (1850), and works on Italian opera. Between 1847 and 1849 he published the essays Letters on Spain in The Contemporary, which have remained his most popular works. He translated Thomas Carlyle's On Heroes, Hero-Worship, & the Heroic in History (1841) into Russian.

His extensive correspondence with Belinsky, Tolstoy, and others is of great social interest. Much of his aesthetic and literary theory can be found in his letters, especially those he wrote to Ivan Turgenev, and in his essay The Poetry of A. A. Fet, published in 1857 in The Contemporary. Vasily's sister was married to Fet.

The Revolutions of 1848 scared Vasily, and he broke with his liberal associates, becoming more politically conservative as time went by. He also became a more conservative critic, espousing the theory of "art for art's sake" along with Alexander Druzhinin and Pavel Annenkov.

== English translations ==
- A. A. Fet, from Russian Literature Triquarterly #17, Ardis Publishers, 1982.
