= Oblomov =

1859 novel by Ivan Goncharov

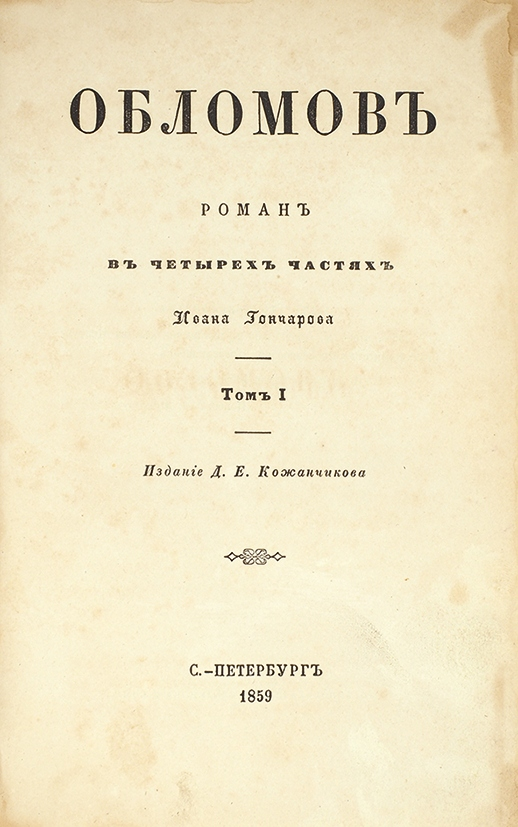
- Author: Ivan Goncharov
- Original title: Обломов
- Translator: C. J. Hogarth
- Language: Russian
- Publication date: 1859
- Publication place: Russia
- Media type: Print
- Preceded by: Frigate "Pallada"

Oblomov (Russian: Обломов, pronounced [ɐˈbloməf]) is the second novel by Russian writer Ivan Goncharov, first published in 1859. Ilya Ilyich Oblomov is the central character of the novel, portrayed as the ultimate incarnation of the superfluous man, a symbolic character in 19th-century Russian literature. Oblomov is a young, generous nobleman who seems incapable of making important decisions or undertaking any significant actions. Throughout the novel, he rarely leaves his room or bed. In the first 50 pages, he only manages to move from his bed to a chair.

The novel was popular when it came out, and some of its characters and devices have imprinted on Russian culture and language.

== Creation and publication ==
Goncharov first thought of writing Oblomov in the mid-1840s, soon after publishing his first novel A Common Story. In 1849 he wrote "Episode from an Unfinished Novel: Oblomov's Dream", a short story that was published in the literary journal Sovremennik. At that point Goncharov had just started writing his novel, and Oblomov was published ten years later, with "Oblomov's Dream" as Chapter 9 in Part 1.

The character that would become Oblomov originally appeared in 1838 in the Maikovs' handwritten magazine written by Goncharov, as one of the protagonists in "Likhaia bolest". Nikon Ustinovich Tiazhelemko, or the pre-Oblomov Oblomov, was a slothful but rather endearing man whose name evokes in Russian the attribute "heavy" (тяжёлый, tjažólyj) and the expression "slow to move" (тяжёлый на подъём, tjažólyj na podʺjóm). The work on Oblomov continued for several years after the publication of "Oblomov's Dream" but was first interrupted by the death of Goncharov's mother, and then his decision to join the around the world voyage of the naval frigate Pallas. When Pallas finally ended its journey in August 1854 in Russia's far east, Goncharov spent another half a year getting acquainted with Siberia and slowly making his way back to St. Petersburg. Although Goncharov was not working on Oblomov during his long journey it appears he was thinking about the book, as Oblomov shows up in many of his letters home. When he tried to begin writing again in February 1855, he blamed his delays and inability to write on exhaustion, loss of momentum, and a new and more demanding job as a censor. The summer of 1857 finally found Goncharov, alone in Marienbad, completely exhilarated and writing Oblomov in full swing. By the end of August the novel was complete. He spent the following year revising and rewriting the novel until finally, on January 14, 1859, Oblomov was published serially in Otechestvennye zapiski.

A later edition in 1862 included a number of changes made by Goncharov. An 1887 edition also featured revisions to the 1859 text and was his last approved edition. Scholars do not agree on which text should be considered canonical.

== Plot summary ==
The novel focuses on the life of the main character, Ilya Ilyich Oblomov. Oblomov is a member of the landed gentry and the son of a member of Russia's nineteenth-century landed gentry. Oblomov's distinguishing characteristic is his slothful attitude towards life. Oblomov raises this trait to an art form, conducting his little daily business from his bed.

The first part of the book finds Oblomov in bed one morning. He receives a letter from the manager of his country estate, Oblomovka, explaining that the financial situation is deteriorating and that he must visit to make some major decisions. But Oblomov can barely leave his bedroom, much less journey a thousand miles into the country.

As he sleeps, a dream reveals Oblomov's upbringing in Oblomovka. He is never required to work or perform household duties, and his parents constantly pull him from school for vacations and trips or for trivial reasons. In contrast, his friend Andrey Stoltz, born to a German father and a Russian mother, is raised in a strict, disciplined environment, and he is dedicated and hard-working.

Stoltz visits at the end of Part 1, finally rousing Oblomov from sleep. As the story develops, Stoltz introduces Oblomov to a young woman, Olga, and the two fall in love. However, his apathy and fear of moving forward are too great, and she calls off their engagement when it is clear that he will keep delaying their wedding and avoiding putting his affairs in order.

Oblomov is swindled repeatedly by his "friends" Taranteyev and Ivan Matveyevich, his landlady's brother, and Stoltz has to undo the damage each time. The last time, Oblomov ends up living in penury because Taranteyev and Ivan Matveyevich are blackmailing him out of all of his income from the country estate, which lasts for over a year before Stoltz discovers the situation and reports Ivan Matveyevich to his supervisor. Meanwhile, Olga leaves Russia and visits Paris, where she bumps into Stoltz on the street. The two strike up a romance and end up marrying.

However, not even Oblomov could go through life without at least one moment of self-possession and purpose. When Taranteyev's behavior at last reaches insufferable lows, Oblomov confronts him, slaps him, and finally kicks him out of the house. Sometime before his death he is visited by Stoltz, who had promised to his wife a last attempt at bringing Oblomov back to the world. During this visit Stoltz discovers that Oblomov has married his widowed landlady, Agafia Matvievna, and had a child – named Andrey, after Stoltz. Stoltz realizes that he can no longer hope to reform Oblomov, and leaves. Oblomov spends the rest of his life in a second Oblomovka, continuing to be taken care of by Agafia Matvievna as he used to be taken care of as a child. She can prepare the food he likes, cares for the household, and makes sure that Oblomov does not have a single worrisome thought.

By then Oblomov had already accepted his fate, and during the conversation he mentions "Oblomovitis" as the real cause of his demise. Oblomov dies in his sleep, finally fulfilling his wish to sleep forever. Stoltz adopts his son upon his death. At the end of the book, Stolz walks with a friend, a writer, presumably Goncharov, when they meet a homeless Zakhar.

== Characters ==
- Ilya Ilyich Oblomov is the eponymous character of the novel. Raised to never worry about his education or the running of his inherited estate, Oblomov spends the novel attempting to recreate his childhood idyll. By the beginning of the story, his inactivity and fear of responsibility have led to the disrepair of his estate and personal affairs. Part I of the novel follows Oblomov's morning, as he refuses to take care of his estate and apartment in favor of sleeping and dreaming about his childhood home. Only Stoltz can get him out of bed, but cannot convince Oblomov to revisit his estate. Oblomov gradually falls in love with Stoltz's friend Olga and the two become engaged as she attempts to continue Stoltz's mission of improving Oblomov. Olga eventually breaks off the engagement when she realizes that Oblomov is unable to change his ways. While he sincerely attempts to follow Stoltz's and Olga's advice throughout the novel, he ultimately resists their changes and lives out the rest of his life with Agafia Matvievna and their children, having never gone back to Oblomovka.
- Andrey Ivanovich Stoltz is Oblomov's best friend from childhood, and is married to Olga by the end of the novel. The only child of a German father and Russian mother, Stoltz went to the same school as Oblomov and frequently visited Oblomov's family. While Stoltz's father instilled ideals of efficiency and practicality, Stoltz's mother often attempted to ease her husband's lessons by pampering Stoltz and teaching him music. The influence of Stoltz's father leaves him a practical and work-oriented man, but his childhood days in Oblomovka cause him to be lifelong friends with Oblomov. Stoltz spends much of the novel attempting to help Oblomov, both by solving Oblomov's financial and other problems and trying to mold Oblomov in his image. His efforts center mainly around getting Oblomov to regain control of his estate. Ultimately Stoltz himself handles Oblomovka's renovation, modernizing it and investing in new infrastructure. His final attempt to bring Oblomov back to Oblomovka fails when he realizes that Oblomov has married Agafia Matvievna, and instead he adopts Oblomov's son upon Oblomov's death.
- Olga Ilyinsky is introduced to Oblomov by Stoltz and is included in Stoltz's attempts to reform Oblomov. Olga spends much of her time throughout the novel determined to change Oblomov's ways. She and Oblomov fall in love, and her efforts seem to be successful for a time, as Oblomov reads more novels and attends more social events. The two become engaged, but Oblomov's deep-set fear of moving forward prevent him from taking necessary steps toward actual marriage, and Olga breaks off the engagement. Olga then travels to Paris with her aunt, where she runs into Stoltz. The two fall in love and marry, moving to the Crimea.
- Zakhar is Oblomov's servant. He constantly tries to get Oblomov to get his life in order by reminding him about the dues of his estate. He is an ineffective servant but extremely devoted to his master, and he holds the Oblomov family in high esteem. He becomes a beggar after Oblomov's death until Stoltz finds and takes care of him.
- Agafia Matvievna is Oblomov's widowed landlady, who falls in love with him and holds him in high regard as a nobleman. She is also Ivan Matveyevich's sister. At the end of the story, it is revealed to Stoltz that Oblomov and Agafia are married with a son.
- Taranteyev and Ivan Matveyevich are Oblomov's "friends", who repeatedly swindle him. Taranteyev and Ivan end up blackmailing Oblomov out of all of his income from the country estate. This stunt lasts for over a year before Stoltz discovers the situation and reports Ivan Matveyevich and Taranteyev to his supervisor. When Taranteyev's behavior at last reaches insufferable lows, Oblomov confronts him, slaps him around a bit and finally kicks him out of the house.

== Style ==
=== Narrator ===
The narrator of Oblomov appears as a rather traditional third-person narrator. In the beginning of the novel he is largely invisible and lets the characters do the talking. As the novel progresses he comes far less neutral and actually begins to not only describe the characters but he begins to judge them, like criticizing Oblomov's family for being overly protective of Ilya as a child, or calling Oblomov's false friends "parasites". The narrator's strongly developed moralizing tendencies are constantly upset by an equally strong note of ambivalence that undermines his judgements. The narrator seems to be someone who may wish he knew the answers but is honest enough to admit that he does not. Goncharov is eager by the end of the novel to make a distinction between himself and the narrator by making the narrator an invented character. However, Goncharov chooses to reveal the identity of the narrator only when the revelation would not affect our reading of the novel. There are many moments when the narrator reveals himself to be uncharacteristically chatty, digressive, and not entirely "reliable".

=== Characterizations and depictions ===
Goncharov used a lot of dialogue within his works. Therefore, the characters in Oblomov reveal themselves primarily through their own speech, with very limited comments by the author. "The colloquial exchanges here coexist with long passages that characterize the novel's inhabitants more directly".

== Themes ==
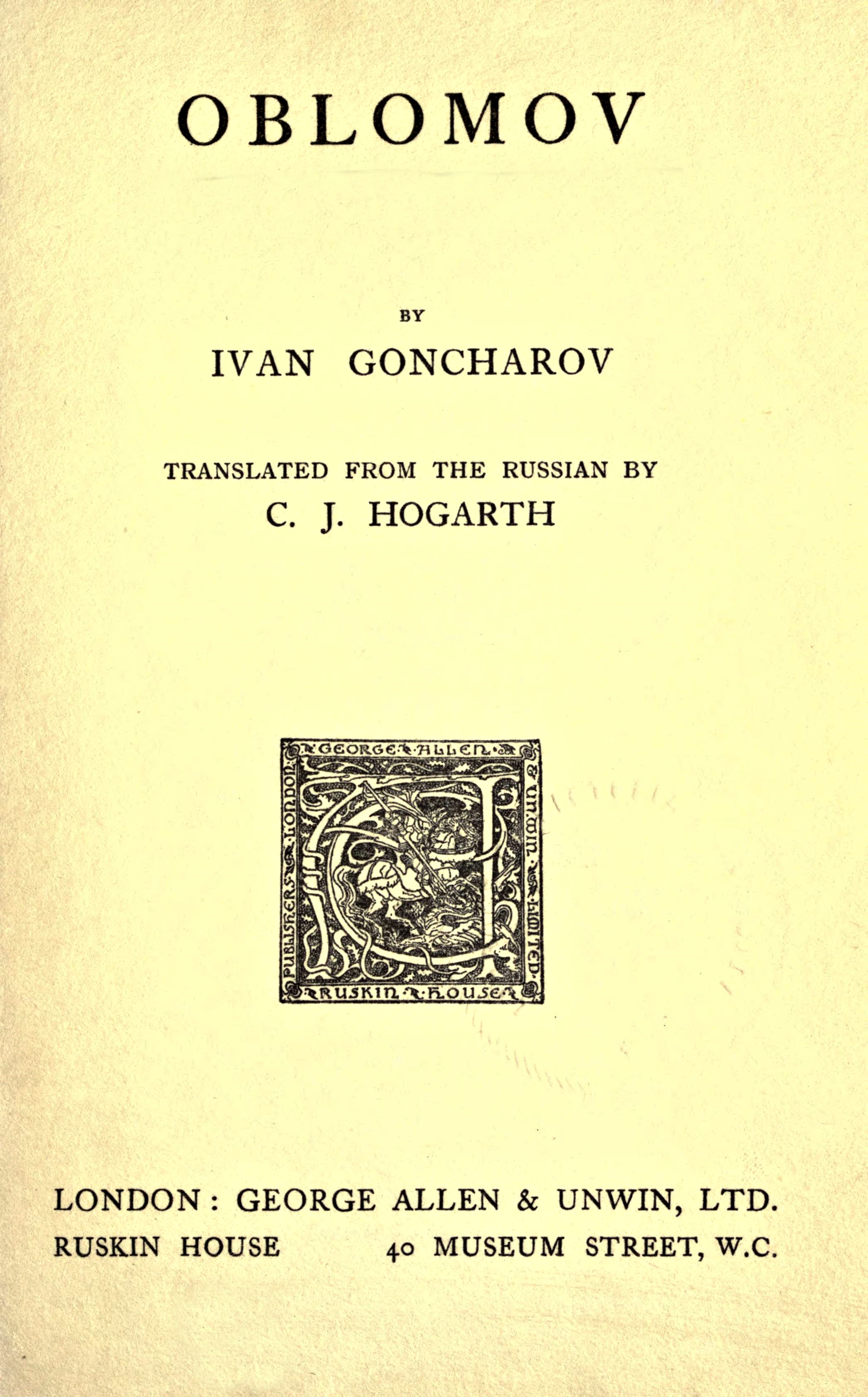
Title page of the 1915 English translation by C. J. Hogarth

=== Stages of life ===
Goncharov wrote three novels over the course of his life: The Same Old Story, Oblomov, and The Precipice. Each novel was based heavily on autobiographical material, focusing on different epochs of life – specifically, infancy and childhood as influenced by the mother; then the "awakening of adolescence"; and finally adulthood as associated with St. Petersburg, government work, and marriage. The main characters of all three books share multiple important similarities: their fathers have either been absent or largely insignificant in their upbringings, they rely heavily on their mothers even past childhood, and they travel to St. Petersburg during their university years. Goncharov himself lost his father at the age of seven, and worked in St. Petersburg as a translator after graduating from Moscow State University. Aduev, the protagonist of The Same Old Story, also isolates himself from reality and prefers to live within his imagination much like Oblomov does.

With these thematically linked protagonists, Goncharov envisioned Oblomov as part of a thematic "trilogy", fitting between his other two novels. Goncharov imagined his novels as different reflections of a single personality; "they are but one tremendous structure, one mirror reflecting in miniature three epochs: Old Life, Sleep, and Awakening." Aduev, Oblomov, and Raysky (the protagonist of The Precipice) therefore form "but one personality in its successive rebirths." Oblomov represents the epoch of "Sleep" in Goncharov's vision. Yet many literary critics have found Goncharov's vision to be lacking. Belinsky and Dobrolyubov, two well-known literary critics who wrote famous reviews of Goncharov's works, failed to recognize a larger connection between Oblomov and Goncharov's other novels.

==== Childhood ====
Oblomov spends much of his adult life attempting to remain within his childhood, a time that he remembers for its peacefulness and the safety provided by his mother. His memory of childhood in Oblomovka is dominated by its cyclical time, with "births, celebrations, feasts...new faces take the places of the old, baby boys grow into marriageable young men who duly marry and reproduce themselves. Such is the pattern according to which life weaves itself this seamless length of identical fabric to be snipped gently only at the grave itself." The Oblomovka of his childhood keeps track of time through the cyclical events of birth, death, and natural seasons, relying on the repetition of events to pass through life. Even Oblomov's name and patronymic, Ilya Ilyich, reveal him as a repeat of his father instead of just a son. This instilling of contentment through repetition renders Oblomov ill-equipped for the expectations placed on his adulthood in a rapidly changing society.

==== Adulthood ====
Adulthood constantly discourages Oblomov, whose main desire is to retreat into the safety of his childhood sense of time. He attempts to take on jobs and responsibilities for Oblomovka, but upon realizing the tasks these require, he becomes easily defeated and retreats into metaphorical and literal sleep. Even his desire to return to Oblomovka cannot be realized, as the estate has fallen into disarray and has now become a responsibility instead of a safe haven. His main foray into adulthood comes about through Olga, who attempts to motivate him to take on responsibilities out of love for her. Particularly for Oblomov, adulthood means changing his cyclical sense of time to continually look forward instead of back. Yet he remains stuck within his childhood desire for things to stay put; loving Olga means that he does not wish to change her like she wishes to change him, but his sense of time prevents him from thinking of the future, and he therefore cannot progress into adulthood by marrying her.

Stoltz, in contrast, exemplifies society's expectations for adulthood in his eagerness to move forward. His own childhood is marked heavily by his father's insistence on treating him as an adult and teaching him the importance of accomplishment, which carries into his adulthood. Stoltz, unlike Oblomov, sees his life as a straight line and is therefore driven by the desire to continually move forward.

=== Oblomovism ===
The words Oblomovism and Oblomovitis (translations of Russian: обломовщина, oblomovshchina) refer to the fatalistic slothfulness that Oblomov exhibits.

Nikolai Dobrolyubov, in his 1859 article "What is Oblomovism?", described the word as an integral part of Russian avos'. Stolz suggests that Oblomov's death was the result of "Oblomovism".

However, Elaine Blair argues in "The Short Happy Life of Ilya Ilyich Oblomov" that Oblomov is "not merely lazy". She simply says "our hero favors very short-term pleasures over long-term ones"; "he is self-conscious in a way that no farcical character or Rabelaisian grotesque would be", and, "to Oblomov, to be absorbed in any task is to lose something of oneself; a person can maintain his full dignity only in repose".

A character named "Oblomov" in art patron Peggy Guggenheim's memoir Out of This Century was identified by poet Stephen Spender as Samuel Beckett, her one-time lover.

=== Social changes in Russia ===
Oblomov's place in the context of Russian history became the focus of much literary criticism when it was first published. Goncharov himself thought of Oblomov more as a treatise on human nature than as commentary on Russian society, but Dobrolyubov focused heavily on Oblomov and Stoltz as social and ethical antitheses; Oblomov became an allegory for the superfluousness of Russian aristocracy in a time when serfdom was soon to be abolished. This contrast is further drawn by the name Stoltz, or pride in German. As a member of the old nobility, Oblomov's inertia and fear of change represent old socioeconomic ideals that become out of place throughout the 19th century. Stoltz and Olga become Oblomov's main connections to present Russia, but Oblomov ultimately rejects the social changes they represent when he marries Agafya and lives the rest of his life in a second Oblomovka.

Despite Oblomov's own inertia, Oblomovka successfully integrates into present Russia thanks to Stoltz's efforts at modernization. Stoltz introduces new infrastructure and education for the peasants at Oblomovka, and revitalizes its profits. Yet just as Russia no longer has a place for Oblomov, Russia similarly does not yet have a place for Stoltz as a leader of social change, and Stoltz continuously travels to different countries instead of staying in Russia for business. Olga, therefore, becomes the link between past and future Russia, in her love for Oblomov and her marriage to Stoltz.

== Literary criticism ==
Almost immediately upon its release in 1859, Oblomov became the subject of much discussion and literary criticism, due in large part to Dobrolyubov's essay "What is Oblomovism?". Today it is still seen as a classic of 19th-century Russian literature, and a quintessential Russian novel.

"What is Oblomovism?" focused heavily on the social significance of the novel, interpreting Stoltz and Olga as social ideals in contrast to Oblomov's reliance on the past. Dobrolyubov, a follower of Vissarion Belinsky and a leading literary critic, believed strongly that literature should promote positive change, and his essay praised Oblomov as an effective warning against the Russian social disease of "Oblomovism". Aside from introducing Oblomov to a large literary circle, the essay catalyzed Oblomov's presence as a novel of social significance and became Dobrolyubov's best-known work. Goncharov himself was happy with Dobrolyubov's interpretation, writing that "there is nothing left to be said about Oblomovism, that is its meaning, after the publication of this article."

Another critic, Alexander Druzhinin, focused on the psychological and literary aspects of Oblomov, instead of the historical context. Rather than interpreting characters as either warnings or ideals of society, Druzhinin praised the portrayal of Stoltz and Olga as psychological and artistic foils to Oblomov. Druzhinin believed that Oblomov, not Oblomovism, was the focus of the novel; characters and readers alike loved Oblomov, making him deserving of recognition as a unique character within Russian literary canon.

== Adaptations ==
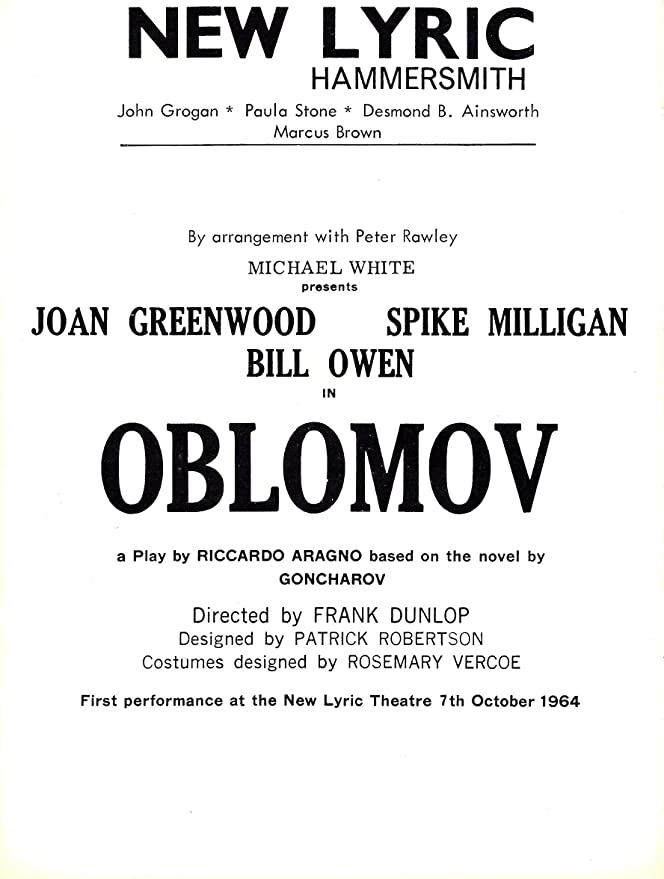
1964 playbill for Oblomov, when it was still being presented as a serious drama.

=== Spike Milligan play ===
The novel was adapted for the stage by Italian writer Riccardo Aragno. Aragno's script for Oblomov was bought by Spike Milligan's production company in early 1964. Milligan had long nurtured hopes of transitioning from comedy to serious drama. To this end, Milligan rehearsed for seven weeks with director Frank Dunlop and castmates Joan Greenwood, Bill Owen, and Valentine Dyall.

The play opened at the Lyric Theatre, Hammersmith, on October 7, 1964. During the first performance Milligan was struck by stage fright and forgot nearly all of his lines. He quickly began making up things to say to the cast, turning the drama into an impromptu improv session. Noticing that a drama critic who'd given rave reviews to Milligan's other stage comedies was in the audience, Milligan ended the first performance by shouting "Thank God, Milton Shulman's in!"

The play was savaged in the theatrical press. However, Oblomov's producers had booked the play into the Lyric for three weeks. Anxious to recoup their investment by any means, they gave Milligan carte-blanche on stage. Milligan's antics included starting the play while sitting with the audience, yelling for his castmates to entertain him. Another night he wore a false arm that fell out of his sleeve when co-star Ian Flintoff, playing Oblomov's doctor, shook Milligan's hand. When Flintoff complained to Bill Kerr, a longtime friend of Milligan, that Spike was making a mockery of their hard work Kerr replied, "We have to put up with all the shit, mate, because it pays the rent."

The play kept running as an improv comedy. This decision soon caused it to break all box office records at the Lyric. After five weeks it was rechristened Son of Oblomov and on December 2, 1964, moved to the Comedy Theatre in the West End. It would run there for a total of 559 performances. As the play was substantially new for each performance it drew record numbers of repeat traffic.

On April 22, 1965, Queen Elizabeth and her family attended as part of her 39th birthday celebration. Shortly after the play began, a group of four latecomers attempted to slink to their seats directly in front of the royal family. Milligan immediately shouted "Turn up the house lights! Start everything again!" He pointed to the blushing foursome and cried "That's cost you your knighthood!"

Then, noticing that Peter Sellers was seated between Prince Charles and Princess Margaret, Milligan asked in a loud voice "Is there a Sellers in the house?" Sellers immediately shouted "Yes!" Milligan launched into a vaudeville routine about Prince Phillip's suspenders, with Sellers participating from his seat with the royals. This culminated in Milligan giving a high-kick, lobbing one of his bedroom slippers at Sellers, nearly missing Prince Phillip's head. Once back in bed with co-star Joan Greenwood, Milligan spent the rest of the performance mocking the Queen for bringing her son to such a racy play. The play ended with Milligan unsheathing a katana on stage and asking the Queen to knight him for his efforts that night. She declined. The performance ran 45 minutes over its scheduled ending. Prince Charles reportedly saw the play five times.

=== Film adaptations ===
Oblomov was adapted to the cinema screen in the Soviet Union by Nikita Mikhalkov in 1980 as A Few Days from the Life of I. I. Oblomov. This film was later named Best Foreign Language Film for 1981 by the U.S. National Board of Review.

In 1989 BBC TV made an English-language dramatisation of the novel, with George Wendt in the title role. In this version, Oblomov was a lazy modern-day Communist Party boss.

A copy of the novel is shown, and its themes alluded to, by scriptwriter/director John Michael McDonagh in his 2011 feature film The Guard; its protagonist is a cynical police sergeant in rural Ireland.

=== Radio adaptations ===
In 2005 BBC Radio 4 made a two-part English-language dramatisation, heralding the lead character as "a tragic-comic hero for a couch potato generation". It was adapted by Stephen Wyatt, produced and directed by Claire Grove, and starred Toby Jones as the lead, supported by Trevor Peacock, Claire Skinner, Clive Swift, Gerard McDermott, Nicholas Boulton and Richenda Carey. Olga's singing voice was provided by Olivia Robinson, with Helen Crayford on piano.

In 2008 an adaptation was produced for the English service of the Russian national broadcaster, the Voice of Russia.

== English translations ==
- C. J. Hogarth (1915, abridged)

=== Based on 1859 text ===
- David Magarshack (1954)
- Ann Dunnigan (1963)
- Stephen Pearl (2006)

=== Based on 1862 text ===
- Natalie Duddington (1929)
- Marian Schwartz (2008)
