= C. J. Hogarth =

British soldier and translator (1869–1945)

Charles James Hogarth (1869–1945) was a British soldier and prolific translator from Russian, who wrote as C. J. Hogarth. He translated work by writers including Dostoevsky, Tolstoy, Gogol, Turgenev, Maxim Gorky, Ivan Goncharov, Ivan Shmelyov, Ivan Nazhivin, V. O. Klyuchevsky, Henryk Sienkiewicz and Alexandra Kollontai.

== Life ==
Hogarth was born on 7 December 1869 and educated at Charterhouse School. He joined the Highland Light Infantry in 1890, but retired in 1891. In 1900–1901 he fought in the Second Boer War for the 1st Railway Pioneer Regiment, Scott's Sharpshooters and the Cape Special Police. By 1904 he was living in Scarborough.

He died on 5 April 1945.

== Reception ==
Semion Rapoport caustically noted the propagandistic tone, "in the best style of the year 1914", of Hogarth's translation of Ivan Shmelyov's The Sun of the Dead (1927), which anachronistically substituted "German hordes" for Shmelyov's "German". Rapoport was also severe in his criticism of a 1915 translation of Gogol's Dead Souls (a credit sometimes printed as "D. J. Hogarth"):

Mr. Hogarth has a very poor knowledge of Russian but a rich fancy (I believe he, too, is a novelist), and decorates Gogol with such ornaments of style as to make him unrecognisable [...] It would be necessary to copy out practically his whole translation of Gogol's work to point out all the absurd additions and errors which it contains, as it contains them on every page.

Hogarth's version of V. O. Klyuchevsky's five-volume History of Russia has been called "a very poor English translation". His 1915 translation of Goncharov's Oblomov "sounds very British and contains inaccuracies".

== Selected translations ==
- Tolstoy: Childhood, Boyhood, and Youth (1912)
- Dostoevsky: Letters from the Underworld (1913)
- Sienkiewicz: Quo Vadis? (1914)
- Goncharov: Oblomov (1915)
- Gogol: Dead Souls (Dent, 1915)
- Gogol: Taras Bulba and Other Stories (Dent, 1918)
- Turgenev: Fathers and Sons (1921)
- Gorky: Through Russia (1921)
- Klyuchevsky: A History of Russia (1926)
- Shmelyov: The Sun of the Dead (1927)
- Nazhivin: Rasputin (1929)
- Kollontai: Free Love (1932)
