= Pavel Annenkov =

Russian literary critic and memoirist (1813–1887)

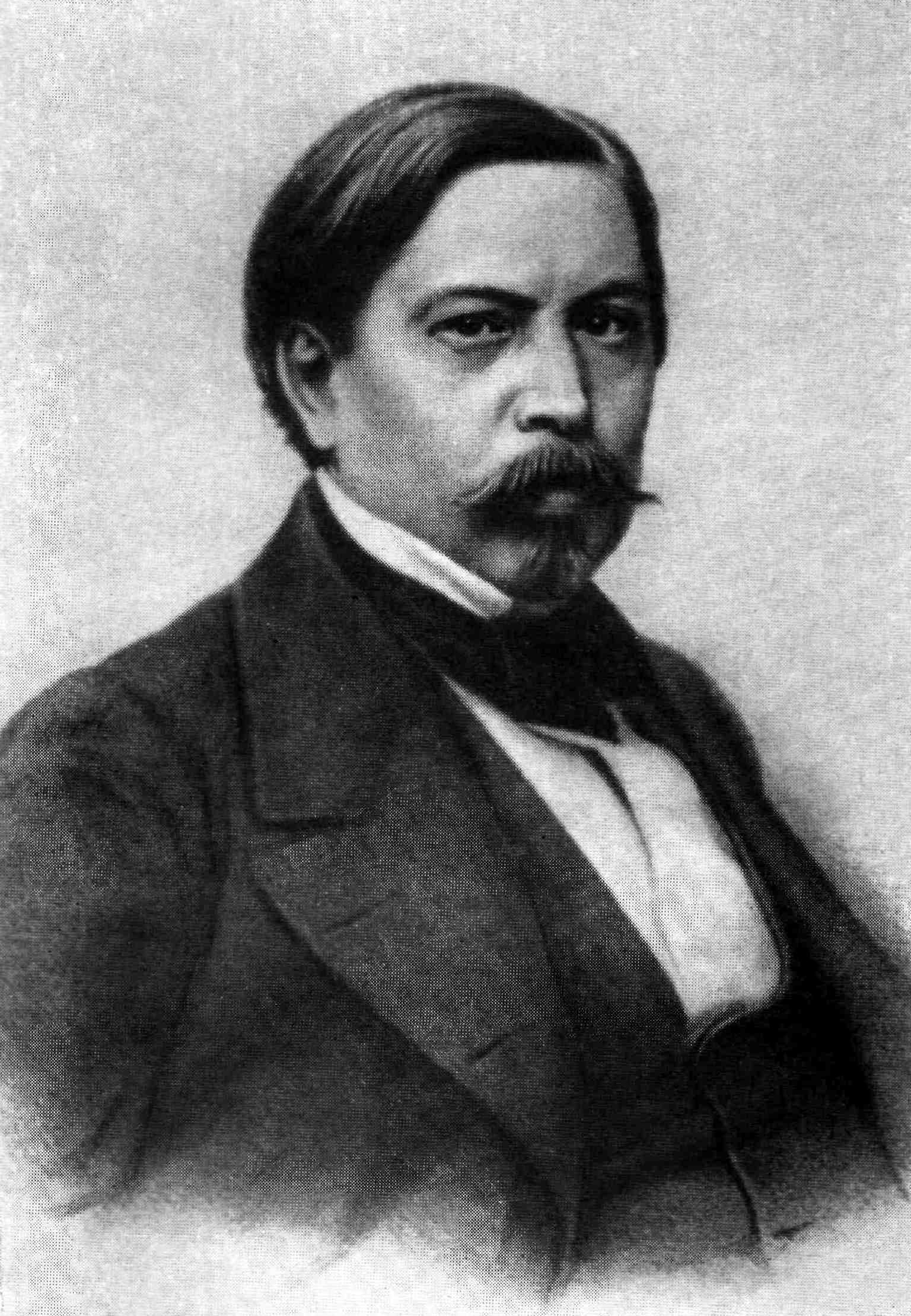
- Born: July 1, 1813; Moscow, Russian Empire
- Died: March 20, 1887 (aged 73); Dresden, German Empire

Pavel Vasilyevich Annenkov (Russian: Па́вел Васи́льевич А́нненков; July 1, 1813 – March 20, 1887) was a Russian literary critic and memoirist.

== Biography ==
Annenkov was born into a wealthy landowning family in Moscow. He attended the philological faculty of St Petersburg University. In the late 1830s he met Vissarion Belinsky, Alexander Herzen, Mikhail Bakunin and Ivan Turgenev, with whom he became lifelong friends. In the 1840s he went abroad and formed a close relationship with Nikolai Gogol.

His letters from Europe appeared in the journal Notes of the Fatherland. A second series of letters from Paris was published in The Contemporary in 1847/48. Annenkov was a correspondent of Karl Marx. He edited the first major scholarly edition of Pushkin's works in 1855. His critical articles were published in various popular journals throughout the 1850s and 1860s. He was an important proponent of aestheticism along with his friend and fellow critic Alexander Druzhinin and with Vasily Botkin.

He is best known now for his memoirs The Extraordinary Decade (1880), the title of which has become attached to the Russian literary generation coming up in the 1830s and 1840s. During the 1880 Pushkin celebrations, he was given an honorary doctorate from Moscow University. He died in Dresden in 1887.

== Notes ==
=== English Translations ===
- The Extraordinary Decade: Literary Memoirs, University of Michigan Press, Ann Arbor, 1968.
