= Frigate "Pallada" =

1858 book by Ivan Goncharov

- Author: Ivan Goncharov
- Original title: Фрегат «Паллада»
- Language: Russian
- Publisher: 1858
- Publication place: Russian Empire
- Media type: Print (hardback & paperback)
- Preceded by: The Same Old Story

Frigate "Pallada" (Russian: Фрегат "Паллада") is a book by Ivan Goncharov, written in 1854–1856 and based on a diary that he kept as a secretary for Admiral Yevfimy Putyatin during his 1852–1854 around-the-world expedition on board the frigate Pallada.

After several chapters of it appeared in 1855–1857 in Otechestvennye Zapiski, Morskoy Sbornik (Sea Anthology) and Sovremennik, in 1858 the first separate edition of Frigate "Pallada" came out, to critical and popular acclaim. In its author's lifetime the book was re-issued five times: in 1862, 1879, 1884 (as part of the Complete Works by Ivan Goncharov edition) and 1886 (twice).

== Background ==
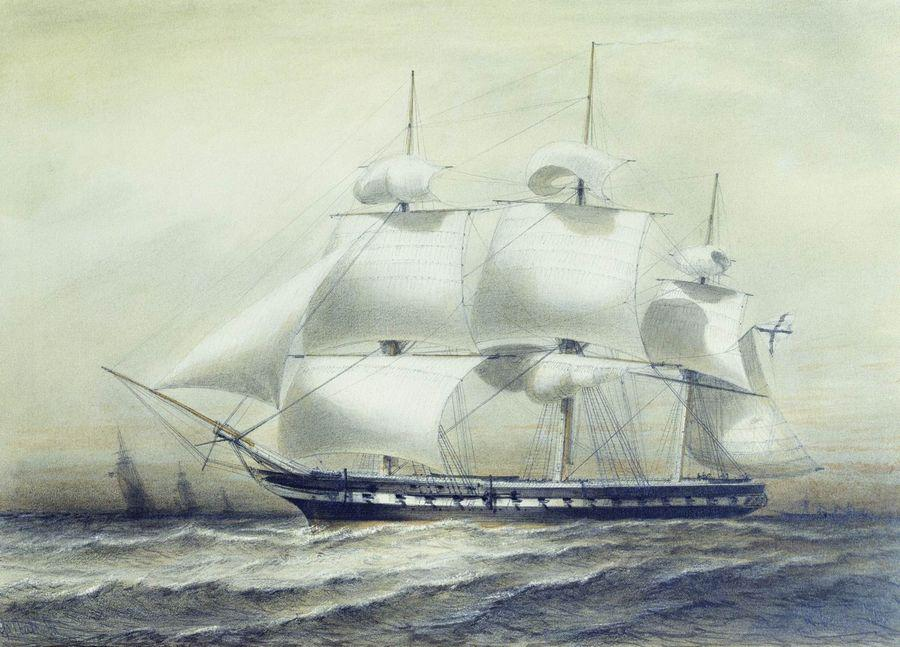
Frigate Pallada

In the autumn of 1852 Goncharov received an invitation to take part in the Admiral Putyatin-led around the world expedition through England, Africa, Japan, and back to Russia. The flotilla, led by the frigate Pallada under the command of Admiral Ivan Unkovsky, included also corvette Olivutsa (Admiral Nikolai Nazimov), schooner Vostok (Voin Rimsky-Korsakov) and Knyaz Menshikov, a small merchant vessel. The mission's objective (beside that of inspecting the Alaskan shores which had been officially declared to be its purpose) was to establish trade relations with Japan, then a closed and, as far as Russia was concerned, mysterious country. As it was successfully completed, Pallada, unable to enter the Amur River because of her draft, had to overwinter in Imperatorskaya Gavan. Goncharov returned to Saint Petersburg on 25 February 1855, after traveling through Siberia and the Urals, this continental leg of the journey lasting six months.

According to Goncharov's commentaries to the first published fragment of the book ("Ryukyu Islands", Otechestvennye Zapiski, April 1855), he "started to keep a diary during the trip and to send his notes back home to friends occasionally... so as to avoid later questions as: 'where have you been, and what have you seen.'" Some of these letters survived and were later published by Literaturnoye Nasledstvo (books 22–24). The logbook that Goncharov kept during the trip has been lost and it remained uncertain to what extent its entries might have been used in the book.

While on board the ship, Goncharov started to shape his notes into literary form. In a 26 March 1854 letter he wrote: "I started my [literary] studies, and to my amazement experienced such a drive that now my suitcase is stuffed with travellers' notes as a result... [Many of these notes] are in good enough order to be sent to print straight away."

== Characters ==
While all of the book's characters were real (and some of them very well known) people, none of them appeared under their real names in the pre-1917 editions. Some were given nicknames (Major general Alexander Khalezov featured here as Oldman, Дед), others, like the author and scientist (later academician) Konstantin Posyet or the ethnographer and scholar Archimandrite Avvakum (Dmitry S. Chestnoy, 1801–1866) were represented by their names' first letters. For decades the readers were unaware of the identities of the true people behind the characters described in the book.

Mixing famous people (like Khalezov for whom that was his fourth round-the-world naval trip) with common sailors and caring for human traits, qualities, modes of speech rather than ranks or titles, Goncharov created a vast and curiously democratic gallery of vivid, memorable characters, which gave the book its distinctly 'novelistic' feel, according to the critic and biographer K. N. Tyunkin.

=== Protagonist ===
Tyunkin warns against automatically associating the book's protagonist with Goncharov himself, seeing him rather as an extenuation of the Ivan Oblomov character. This view is corroborated by Goncharov's December 2, 1852, letter (parts of it were later included in the text of Frigate "Pallada") which he jokingly declared to be "a foreword... to The 'Around-the-World trip by I. Oblomov'."

In another letter he wrote: "I still cherish the hope that one day I'll come to write the chapter called 'The Travellings of Oblomov' and in it will try to show, how it is for a Russian man to search for things in his bags, to learn where this or that object lies, then ten times a day go mad with desperation, sighing for his Mother Russia... And that is exactly what I come through now." According to Tyunkin, in Frigate "Pallada" Goncharov came to realize this initial idea and created a "brilliantly typical type of narrator, with this peculiar sense of humour and meaningful irony."

Occasionally Goncharov addresses some personal issues in the book. The chapter called "The Voyage Through the Tropical Atlantics" is written in the form of an epistle to his friend, the Romantic poet Vladimir Benediktov and should be taken in the context of the author's earlier polemics with his opponents, concerning the aesthetics of Romanticism.

== Concept and themes ==
The account of the events during the trip, provided by the book, is accurate but by no means full; that is another reason why Frigate "Pallada" is occasionally referred to as 'fictionalized travelogue'. It omits many things that would have made it look like proper documentary, most notably everything concerning the diplomatic negotiations the Russian officials held with their Japanese counterparts. It also sidesteps all the difficulties that the expedition had to endure (Pallada was in poor condition and had to make several unplanned stops for repair). The darker side of the journey was dealt with later, in a piece called "Twenty Years On" (Через двадцать лет), written in 1874.

Goncharov saw his objective as creating a vast and detailed, even if purely subjective analytical survey of the life abroad. "...This chance to closely examine and then analyze foreign lives - be it the life of the nation or the life of an individual - provides one with this kind of lesson... that one won't be taught by books or in schools," he wrote.

Goncharov saw Frigate "Pallada" as closely linked to his famous trilogy, in a sense that all four books dealt in one way or the other with the notion of the time of change coming to Russia. These new times, according to the author, warranted not only the re-evaluation of Russia's past, but also close attention to similar processes as experienced by other countries.

While totally overlooked by contemporary critics (including those belonging to the Socialist camp), in retrospect one of Frigate "Pallada"'s recurring themes was the critique of Western colonialism, in Africa, but mostly in China.

== Critical reception ==
The initial response to Frigate "Pallada" was very warm, although most of the reviews in retrospect seem superficial and flat. The liberal author and critic Stepan Dudyshkin, reviewing the 1855 fragmentary publications, commented: "The artist remains the artist everywhere... so what new does Goncharov's account of his travels bring to our literature? Lots of pictures of Southern nature and life, painted by experienced painter's brush; pictures which for a long time will be viewed with great pleasure." Another liberal critic, Alexander Druzhinin, saw Goncharov as a 'practical artist' and, drawing parallels with the Flemish painting, defined the author's object as "revealing poetic meanings in what would look like simple, everyday life."

Nikolai Nekrasov reviewed each chapter published by Sovremennik in 1855, praising the "liveliness and beauty of language" as well as the "moderation of tone" which enabled the author to depict every object "in its true light, full of mild overtones as well and multiple colours." According to Dmitry Pisarev's 1858 review, Goncharov's notes "provide little by way of scientific data, or new explorations; they even lack detailed descriptions of the lands and the cities that he visited. What he gives us instead is the gallery of masterfully painted etudes which strike one by their freshness, completeness and originality." According to Nikolay Dobrolyubov, Frigate "Pallada" "bore the hallmark of a gifted epic novelist."

In retrospect, modern Russian critics see the book as a well-balanced, unbiased report, containing valuable ethnographic material, but also some social critique.
