= Ivan Goncharov =

Russian novelist and official (1812–1891)

- 1874 portrait
- Born: 18 June 1812; Simbirsk, Russia
- Died: 27 September 1891 (aged 79); Saint Petersburg, Russia
- Education: Imperial Moscow University (1835)
- Occupation: Novelist
- Writing career
- Period: 1847–1871
- Notable works: The Same Old Story (1847); Oblomov (1859); The Precipice (1869)

Ivan Aleksandrovich Goncharov (/ˈɡɒntʃərɒf/ GON-chə-rof, US also /-rɔːf/ -rawf; Russian: Ива́н Алекса́ндрович Гончаро́в, IPA: [ɪˈvan ɐlʲɪkˈsandrəvʲɪdʑ ɡənʲtɕɪˈrof]; 18 June [O.S. 6 June] 1812 – 27 September [O.S. 15 September] 1891) was a Russian novelist best known for his novels The Same Old Story (1847, also translated as A Common Story), Oblomov (1859), and The Precipice (1869, also translated as Malinovka Heights). He also served in many official capacities, including the position of censor.

Goncharov was born in Simbirsk into the family of a wealthy merchant; as a reward for his grandfather's military service, they were elevated to the Russian nobility. He was educated at a boarding school, then the Moscow College of Commerce, and finally at Moscow State University. After graduating, he served for a short time in the office of the Governor of Simbirsk, before moving to Saint Petersburg where he worked as government translator and private tutor, while publishing poetry and fiction in private almanacs. Goncharov's first novel, The Same Old Story, was published in Sovremennik in 1847.

Goncharov's second and best-known novel, Oblomov, was published in 1859 in Otechestvennye zapiski. His third and final novel, The Precipice, was published in Vestnik Evropy in 1869. He also worked as a literary and theatre critic. Towards the end of his life Goncharov wrote a memoir called An Uncommon Story, in which he accused his literary rivals, first and foremost Ivan Turgenev, of having plagiarized his works and prevented him from achieving European fame. The memoir was published in 1924. Fyodor Dostoevsky, among others, considered Goncharov an author of high stature. Anton Chekhov is quoted as stating that Goncharov was "...ten heads above me in talent."

== Early life ==
Goncharov was born on 6 June 1812 (O.S.) in Simbirsk (now Ulyanovsk). His father, Aleksander Ivanovich Goncharov, was a wealthy grain merchant and a state official who served several terms as mayor of Simbirsk. The family's big stone manor in the town center occupied a large area and had all the characteristics of a rural manor, with huge barns (packed with wheat and flour) and numerous stables. Alexander Ivanovich died when Ivan was seven years old. He was educated first by his mother, Avdotya Matveevna, and then his godfather Nikolay Nikolayevich Tregubov, a nobleman and a former Russian Navy officer.

Tregubov, a man of liberal views and a secret Masonic lodge member, who knew some of the Decembrists personally, and who was one of the most popular men amongst the Simbirsk intelligentsia, was a major early influence upon Goncharov, who particularly enjoyed his seafaring stories. With Tregubov around, Goncharov's mother could focus on domestic affairs. "His servants, cabmen, the whole household merged with ours; it was a single family. All the practical issues were now mother's, and she proved to be an excellent housewife; all the official duties were his," Ivan Goncharov remembered.

== Education ==
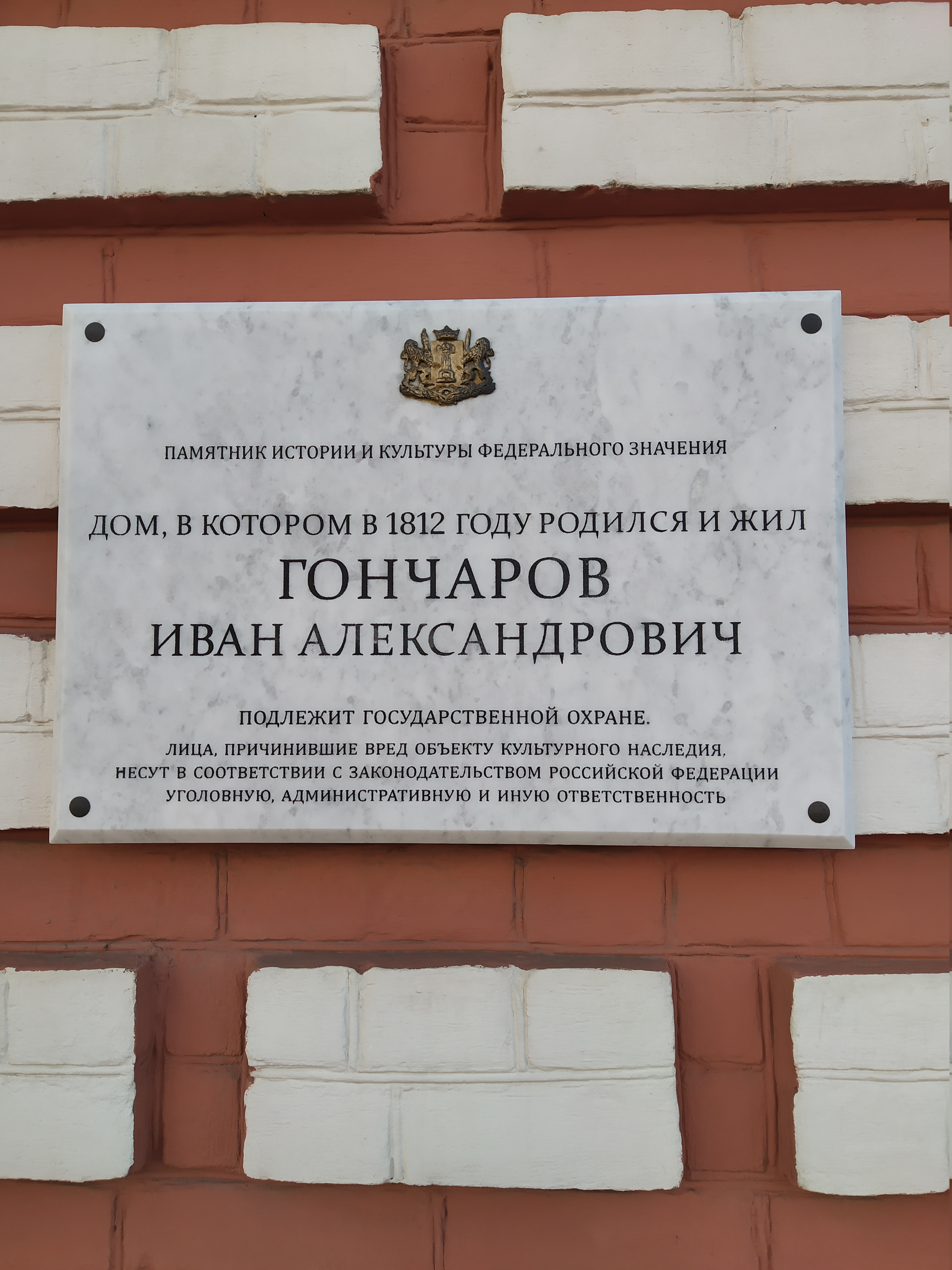
Plaque on the house in 20 Goncharova street in Ulyanovsk, where Goncharov was born in 1812

In 1820–1822 Goncharov studied at a private boarding-school owned by Rev. Fyodor S. Troitsky. It was here that he learned the French and German languages and started reading European writers, borrowing books from Troitsky's vast library. In August 1822, Ivan was sent to Moscow and entered the College of Commerce. There he spent eight unhappy years, detesting the low quality of education and the severe discipline, taking solace in self-education. "My first humanitarian and moral teacher was Nikolai Karamzin", he remembered. Then Pushkin came as a revelation; the serial publication of his poem Eugene Onegin captured the young man's imagination. In 1830, Goncharov decided to quit the college, and in 1831 (having missed one year because of a cholera outbreak in Moscow), he enrolled in Moscow State University's Philology Faculty to study literature, arts, and architecture.

At the University, with its atmosphere of intellectual freedom and lively debate, Goncharov's spirit thrived. One episode proved to be especially memorable: when his then-idol Alexander Pushkin arrived as a guest lecturer to have a public debate with professor Mikhail T. Katchenovsky on the authenticity of The Tale of Igor's Campaign. "It was as if sunlight lit up the auditorium. I was enchanted by his poetry at the time...it was his genius that formed my aesthetic ideas – although the same, I think, could be said of all the young people of the time who were interested in poetry", Goncharov wrote. Unlike Alexander Herzen, Vissarion Belinsky or Nikolay Ogaryov, his fellow Moscow University students, Goncharov remained indifferent to the ideas of political and social change that were gaining popularity at the time. Reading and translating were his main occupations. In 1832, the Telescope magazine published two chapters of Eugène Sue's novel Atar-Gull (1831), translated by Goncharov. This was his debut publication.

In 1834, Goncharov graduated from the University and returned home to enter the chancellery of Simbirsk governor A. M. Zagryazhsky. A year later, he moved to Saint Petersburg and started working as a translator at the Finance Ministry's Foreign commerce department. Here, in the Russian capital, he became friends with the Maykov family and tutored both Apollon Maykov and Valerian Maykov in the Latin language and in Russian literature. He became a member of the elitist literary circle based in the Maykovs' house and attended by writers like Ivan Turgenev, Fyodor Dostoyevsky and Dmitry Grigorovich. The Maykovs' almanac Snowdrop featured many of Goncharov's poems, but he soon stopped dabbling in poetry altogether. Some of those early verses were later incorporated into the novel The Same Old Story as Aduev's writings, a sure sign that the author had stopped taking them seriously.

== Literary career ==
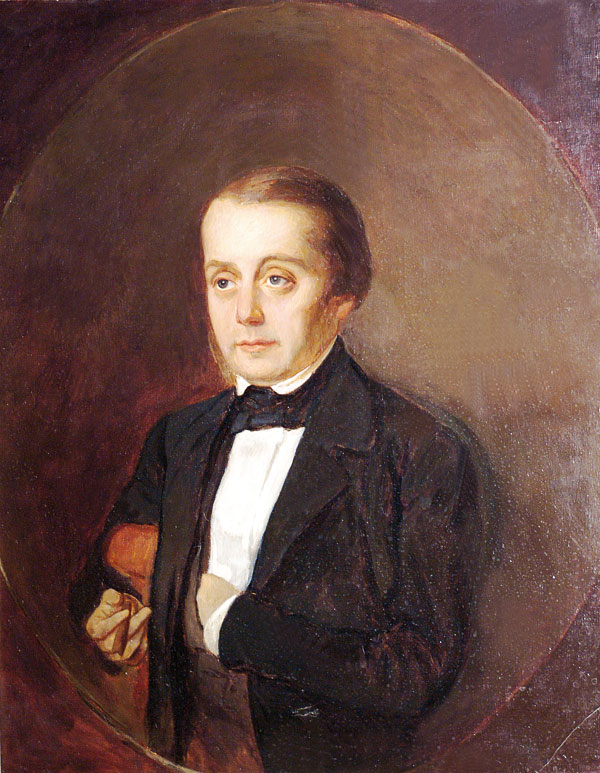
Portrait of Goncharov by Kirill Gorbunov, 1847

His first piece of prose appeared in an issue of Snowdrop, a satirical novella called Evil Illness (1838), ridiculing romantic sentimentalism and fantasizing. Another novella, A Fortunate Blunder, a "high-society drama" in the tradition set by Marlinsky, Vladimir Odoevsky, and Vladimir Sollogub, tinged with comedy, appeared in another privately published almanac, Moonlit Nights, in 1839. In 1842 Goncharov wrote an essay called Ivan Savvich Podzhabrin, a natural school psychological sketch. Published in Sovremennik six years later, it failed to make any impact, being very much a period piece, but later scholars reviewed it positively, as something in the vein of the Nikolay Gogol-inspired genre known as the "physiological essay", marked by a fine style and precision in depicting the life of the common man in the city. In the early 1840s Goncharov worked on a novel called The Old People, but the manuscript has been lost.

=== The Same Old Story ===
Goncharov's first novel, The Same Old Story, was published in Sovremennik in 1847. It dealt with the conflict between the excessive romanticism of a young Russian nobleman who has recently arrived in Saint Petersburg from the provinces, and the sober pragmatism of the emerging commercial class of the capital. The Same Old Story polarized critics and made its author famous. The novel was a direct response to Vissarion Belinsky's call for exposing a new type, that of the complacent romantic, common at the time; it was lavishly praised by the famous critic as one of the best Russian books of the year. The term aduyevschina (after the novel's protagonist Aduyev) became popular with reviewers who saw it as synonymous with vain romantic aspirations. Leo Tolstoy, who liked the novel, used the same word to describe social egotism and the inability of some people to see beyond their immediate interests.

In 1849 Sovremennik published Oblomov's Dream, an extract from Goncharov's future second novel Oblomov (known under the working title The Artist at the time), which worked well on its own as a short story. Again it was lauded by the Sovremennik staff. Slavophiles, while giving the author credit for being a fine stylist, reviled the irony aimed at patriarchal Russian ways. The novel itself, though, appeared only ten years later, preceded by some extraordinary events in Goncharov's life.

In 1852 Goncharov embarked on a long journey through England, Africa, Japan, and back to Russia, on board the frigate Pallada, as a secretary for Admiral Yevfimy Putyatin, whose mission was to inspect Alaska and other distant outposts of the Empire, and also to establish trade relations with Japan. The log-book which it was Goncharov's duty to keep served as a basis for his future book. He returned to Saint Petersburg on 25 February 1855, after traveling through Siberia and the Urals, this continental leg of the journey lasting six months. Goncharov's travelogue, Frigate "Pallada" ("Pallada" being Russian for "Pallas"), began to appear, first in Otechestvennye Zapiski (April 1855), then in The Sea Anthology and other magazines.

In 1858, Frigate "Pallada" was published as a separate book; it received favourable reviews and became very popular. For the mid-19th-century Russian readership, the book came as a revelation, providing new insights into the world, hitherto unknown. Goncharov, a well-read man and a specialist in the history and economics of the countries he visited, proved to be a competent and insightful writer. He warned against seeing his work as any kind of political or social statement, insisting it was a subjective piece of writing, but critics praised the book as a well-balanced, unbiased report, containing valuable ethnographic material, but also some social critique. Again, the anti-romantic tendency prevailed: it was seen as part of the polemic with those Russian authors who tended to romanticize the "pure and unspoiled" life of the uncivilized world. According to Nikolay Dobrolyubov, The Frigate Pallada "bore the hallmark of a gifted epic novelist."

=== Oblomov ===
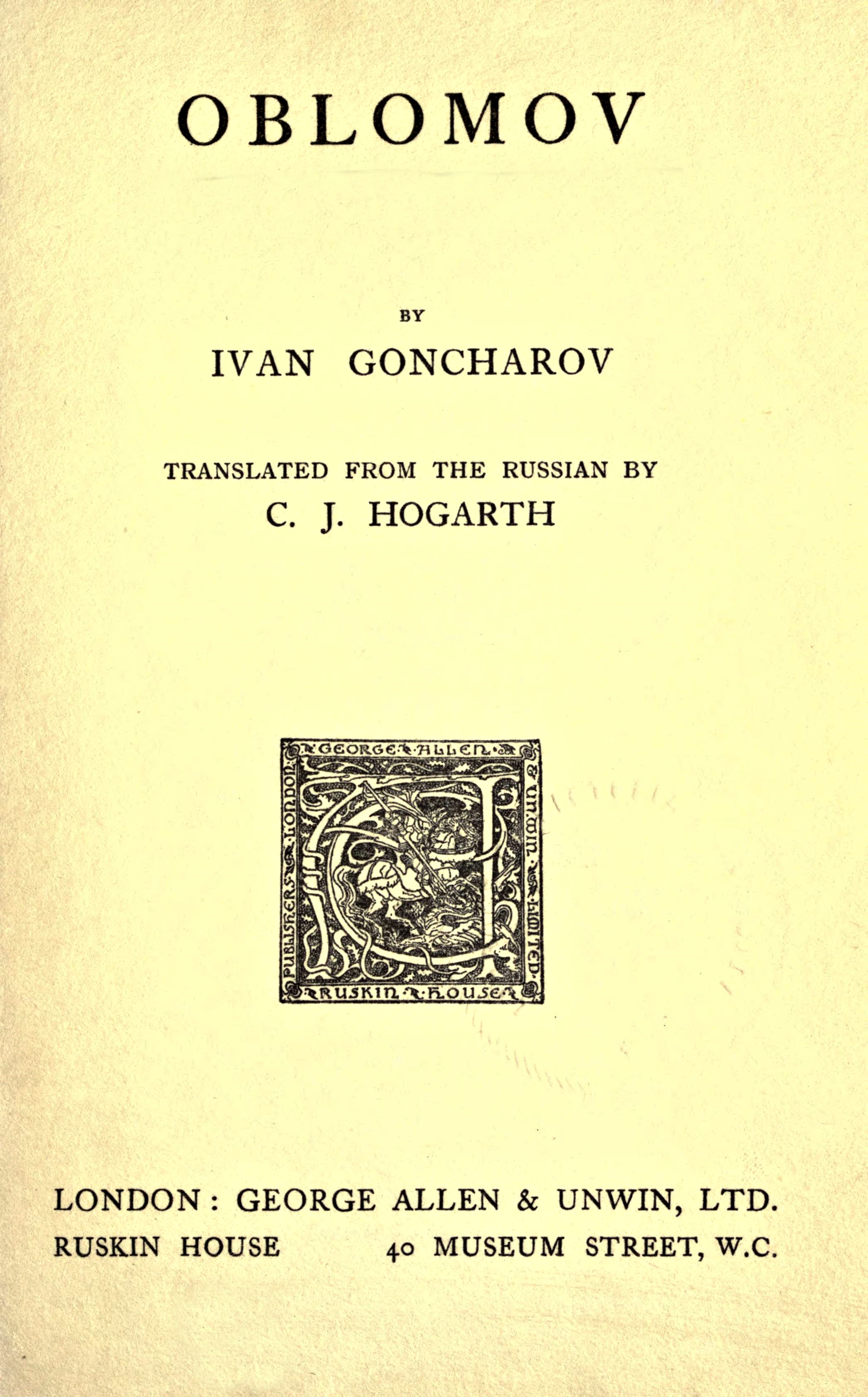
Title page of the 1915 English translation of Oblomov

Throughout the 1850s Goncharov worked on his second novel, but the process was slow for many reasons. In 1855 he accepted the post of censor in the Saint Petersburg censorship committee. In this capacity, he helped publish important works by Ivan Turgenev, Nikolay Nekrasov, Aleksey Pisemsky, and Fyodor Dostoyevsky, a fact that brought resentment from some of his bosses. According to Pisemsky, Goncharov was officially reprimanded for permitting his novel A Thousand Souls to be published. Despite all this, Goncharov became the target of many satires and received a negative mention in Herzen's Kolokol. "One of the best Russian authors shouldn't have taken this sort of job upon himself," critic Aleksander Druzhinin wrote in his diary. In 1856, as the official publishing policy hardened, Goncharov quit.

In the summer of 1857, Goncharov went to Marienbad for medical treatment. There he wrote Oblomov, almost in its entirety. "It might seem strange, even impossible that in the course of one month the whole of the novel might be written... But it'd been growing in me for several years, so what I had to do then was just sit and write everything down," he later remembered. Goncharov's second novel Oblomov was published in 1859 in Otechestvennye Zapiski. It had evolved from the earlier "Oblomov's Dream", which was later incorporated into the finished novel as Chapter 9. The novel caused much discussion in the Russian press, introduced another new term, oblomovshchina, to the literary lexicon and is regarded as a Russian classic.

In his essay What Is Oblomovshchina? Nikolay Dobrolyubov provided an ideological background for the type of Russia's 'new man' exposed by Goncharov. The critic argued that, while several famous classic Russian literary characters – Onegin, Pechorin, and Rudin – bore symptoms of the 'Oblomov malaise', for the first time one single feature, that of social apathy, a self-destructive kind of laziness and unwillingness to even try and lift the burden of all-pervading inertia, had been brought to the fore and subjected to a thorough analysis.

Fyodor Dostoyevsky, among others, considered Goncharov a noteworthy author of high stature. Anton Chekhov is quoted as stating that Goncharov was "...ten heads above me in talent." Turgenev, who fell out with Goncharov after the latter accused him of plagiarism (specifically of having used some of the characters and situations from The Precipice, whose plan Goncharov had disclosed to him in 1855, in Home of the Gentry and On the Eve), nevertheless declared: "As long as there is even one Russian alive, Oblomov will be remembered!"

=== The Precipice ===
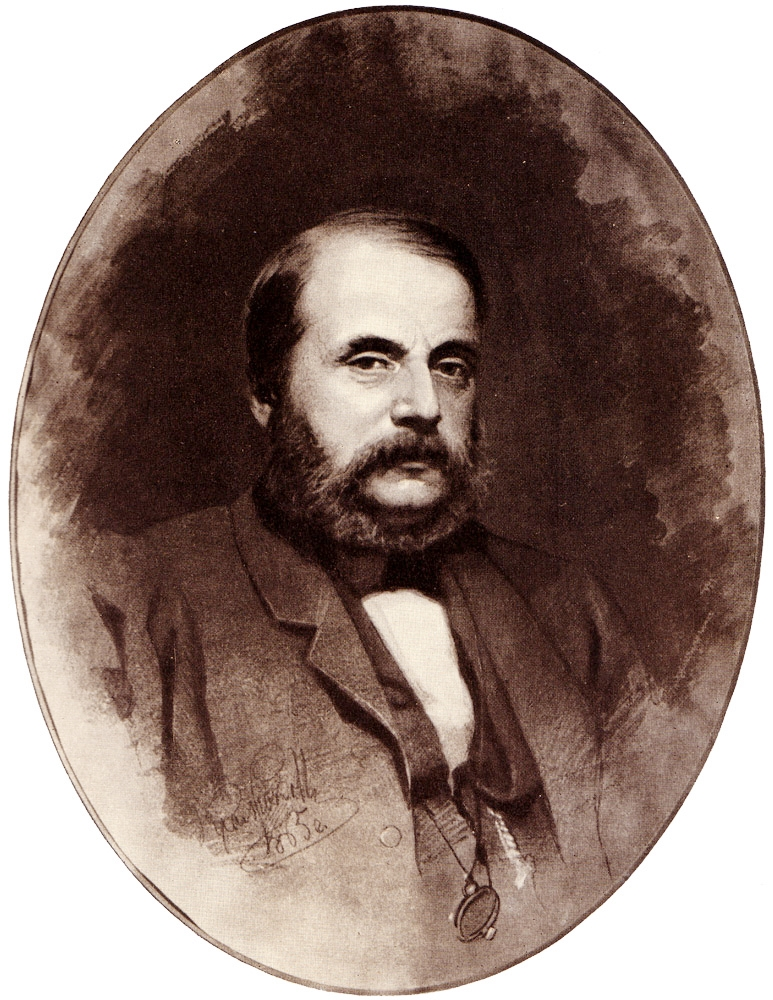
Portrait of Goncharov by Ivan Kramskoi, 1865

A moderate conservative at heart, Goncharov greeted the emancipation reform of 1861, embraced the well-publicized notion of the government's readiness to "be at the helm of [social] progress", and found himself in opposition to the revolutionary democrats. In the summer of 1862 he became an editor of Severnaya Potchta (The Northern Post), an official newspaper of the Interior Ministry, and a year later returned to the censorship committee.

In this second term Goncharov proved to be a harsh censor: he created serious problems for Nekrasov's Sovremennik and Russkoye Slovo, where Dmitry Pisarev was now a leading figure. Openly condemning 'nihilistic' tendencies and what he called "pathetic, imported doctrines of materialism, socialism, and communism", Goncharov found himself the target of heavy criticism. In 1863 he became a member of the State Publishing Council and two years later joined the Russian government's Department of Publishing. All the while he was working on his third novel, The Precipice, which came out in extracts: Sophia Nikolayevna Belovodova (a piece he himself was later skeptical about), Grandmother and Portrait.

In 1867, Goncharov retired from his censorial position to devote himself entirely to writing The Precipice, a book he later called "my heart's child", which took him twenty years to finish. Towards the end of this tormenting process Goncharov spoke of the novel as a "burden" and an "insurmountable task" that blocked his development and made him unable to advance as a writer. In a letter to Turgenev he confessed that, after finishing Part Three, he had toyed with the idea of abandoning the whole project.

In 1869, The Precipice, a story of the romantic rivalry among three men, condemning nihilism as subverting the religious and moral values of Russia, was published in Vestnik Evropy. Later critics came to see it as the final part of a trilogy, each part introducing a character typical of Russian high society of a certain period: first Aduev, then Oblomov, and finally Raisky, a gifted man, his artistic development halted by "lack of direction". According to scholar S. Mashinsky, as a social epic, The Precipice was superior to both The Same Old Story and Oblomov.

The novel had considerable success, but the leftist press turned against its author. Saltykov-Shchedrin in Otechestvennye Zapiski ("The Street Philosophy", 1869), compared it unfavorably to Oblomov. While the latter "had been driven by ideas assimilated by its author from the best men of the 1840s", The Precipice featured "a bunch of people wandering to and fro without any sense of direction, their lines of action having neither beginning nor end," according to the critic. Yevgeny Utin in Vestnik Evropy argued that Goncharov, like all writers of his generation, had lost touch with the new Russia. The controversial character Mark Volokhov, as leftist critics saw it, had been concocted to condemn 'nihilism' again, thus making the whole novel 'tendentious'. Yet, as Vladimir Korolenko later wrote, "Volokhov and all things related to him will be forgotten, as Gogol's Correspondence has been forgotten, while Goncharov's huge characters will remain in history, towering over all of those spiteful disputes of old."

== Later years ==
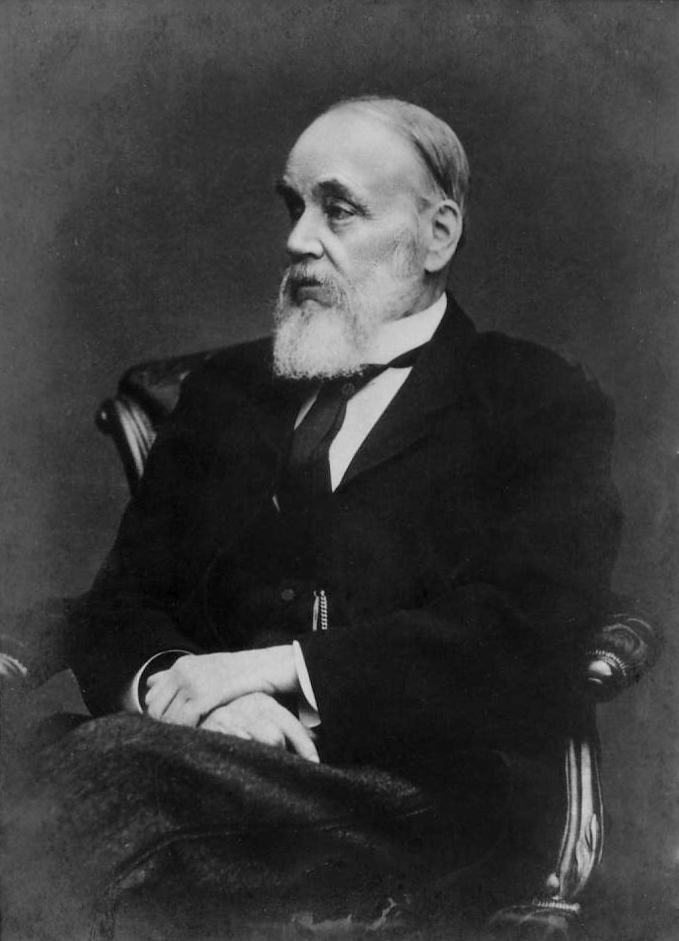
Goncharov in 1886; photograph by Andrey Denyer

Goncharov planned a fourth novel, set in the 1870s, but it failed to materialize. Instead he became a prolific critic, providing numerous theater and literature reviews; his "Myriad of Agonies" (Milyon terzaniy, 1871) is still regarded as one of the best essays on Alexandr Griboyedov's Woe from Wit. Goncharov also wrote short stories: his Servants of an Old Age cycle as well as "The Irony of Fate", "Ukha" and others, described the life of rural Russia. In 1880 the first edition of The Complete Works of Goncharov was published. After the writer's death, it became known that he had burnt many later manuscripts.

Towards the end of his life Goncharov wrote an unusual memoir called An Uncommon Story, in which he accused his literary rivals, first and foremost Ivan Turgenev, of having plagiarized his works and prevented him from achieving European fame. Some critics claimed that the book was the product of an unstable mind, while others praised it as an eye-opening, if controversial piece of writing. It was not published until 1924.

Goncharov, who never married, spent his last days absorbed in lonely and bitter recriminations because of the negative criticism some of his work had received. He died in Saint Petersburg on 27 September 1891, of pneumonia. He was buried at the Novoye Nikolskoe Cemetery of the Alexander Nevsky Lavra. In 1956 his ashes were moved to the Volkovo Cemetery in Leningrad.

== Selected bibliography ==
- Nimfodora Ivanovna (1836) – unpublished novella
- "The Galloping Disease/A Cruel Illness" (1838) – short story
- "A Happy Error" (1839) – short story
- Ivan Savich Podzhabrin (1848)
- The Same Old Story (Обыкновенная история, 1847)
- Letters from a Friend in the Capital to a Bridegroom in the Provinces (1848)
- Frigate "Pallada" (Фрегат "Паллада", 1858)
- "Oblomov's Dream. An Episode from an Unfinished Novel", short story, later Chapter 9 in the 1859 novel as "Oblomov's Dream" ("Сон Обломова", 1849)
- Oblomov (1859)
- The Precipice (Обрыв, 1869)
