= Total Westernization =

Pro-Western thoughts in mainland China

Total Westernization (Chinese: 全盘西化; pinyin: quánpán xīhuà) is a trend of intellectuals in Greater China, first proposed in 1915. Chen Xujing, Hu Shih, and others believed that the invasion of the late Qing dynasty by Western great powers was due to the backwardness of Chinese monarchical culture. Therefore, they advocate learning from Western ways of thinking and behavior, and completely abandoning China's authoritarian culture. Later, Hu Shih changed the concept of total westernization to "full globalization". Hu Qiuyuan believed that the failure of the war was the result of the wrong policies of the Ming and Qing governments and that the appeasement mentality of the traditionalists, the inferiority mentality of the Westernizers, and the dependence mentality of the Russians could all led to the downfall of the country. They should go beyond the three Open Door Policy, maintain an independent perspective, and find the ability of the Chinese nation to create culture. Ju Haoran believed that total Westernization should focus on the technical aspects based on modern Western science, emphasizing "total scientification" and industrialization.

== Total Westernization in the 1980s ==
In 1979, the government of China began the reform and opening up. After the stagnation of the Cultural Revolution, the cultural fever of the 1980s took off. After entering the 1980s, facing the reality of China's backward economic level and a huge gap with Hong Kong, Taiwan, and Western countries, the theory of total westernization once again emerged, directly impacting Chinese society's recognition of the Chinese government and socialist system. The ruling Chinese Communist Party had different views on total Westernization. There were views that regarded total westernization as a bourgeois liberalization proposition and proposed that China should follow the path of socialism with Chinese characteristics formulated by Deng Xiaoping. On the other hand, Wang Ruowang and Fang Lizhi were regarded by the CCP as the leaders of the total Westernization theory.

In 1988, Liu Xiaobo proposed that China should be fully Westernized, and more importantly, it should become a "three-hundred-year colony" of Western countries. In the same year, the China Central Television (CCTV) documentary "River Elegy" totally denied Chinese culture and Chinese civilization. Before the 1989 Tiananmen Square protests and massacre, the theory of total Westernization reached its zenith. Researchers believed that the total Westernization theory of the 1980s was a continuation of the proposition of China's national direction since the Opium War, a reaction of the intelligence community to the halt of China's reform under the demonstration effect of Western countries, and also related to the tendency of the Chinese government to guide public opinion. After the 1990s, in the context of China's economic take-off and national strength improvement, Chinese nationalism rose and the total westernization theory declined.

== See also ==
- Datsu-A Ron
- Westernizer
