= Ivan Nazhivin =

Russian author

Ivan Fyodorovich Nazhivin (Ива́н Фёдорович Нажи́вин) (25 August [6 September] 1874 in Moscow – 5 April 1940 in Brussels) was a Russian writer. He was a follower of Tolstoy, and published mainly in Dmitriy Tikhomirov's Library for the Family and the School.

== Works ==
- Peasant Children (Krestyanskie deti, 1911–15)
- Rasputin 1923, translated into English by C. J. Hogarth
- According to Thomas (NY: Harper Bros. 1931) (Information taken from Physical copy of the book in hand)
