= Westernizer =

Political ideology in 19th-century Russian Empire

Westernizers (/ˈzɑːpɑːdnɪk/; Russian: за́падник, romanized: západnik, IPA: [ˈzapədnʲɪk]) were a group of 19th-century intellectuals who believed that Russia's development depended upon the adoption of Western European technology and liberal government. In their view, Western ideas such as industrialisation needed to be implemented throughout Russia to make it a more successful country. The Russian term was зáпадничество (západnichestvo, "westernism"), and its adherents were known as the за́падники (západniki, "westernists").

In some contexts of Russian history, zapadnichestvo can be contrasted with Slavophilia, whose proponents argued that Russia should develop its own unique identity and culture, based on its Slavic heritage.

In Russia since 2000, the debate rages on how much of western values and methods to adopt or reject.

In modern usage, especially in the developing world, the term can refer to supporters of Western-style economic development.

== Leaders ==
A forerunner of the movement was Pyotr Chaadayev (1794–1856). He exposed the cultural isolation of Russia, from the perspective of Western Europe, and his Philosophical Letters of 1831. He cast doubt on the greatness of the Russian past, and criticized Russian Orthodoxy for failing to provide a sound spiritual or theological basis for the Russian intelligentsia. He extolled the achievements of Catholic Europe, especially in rational and logical thought, its progressive spirit and its leadership in science and on the path to freedom.

Vissarion Belinsky (1811–1848) was the dominant figure. He worked primarily as a literary critic, because that area was less heavily censored than political pamphlets. He agreed with Slavophiles that society had precedence over individualism, but he insisted the society had to allow the expression of individual ideas and rights. He strongly opposed Slavophiles on the role of Orthodoxy, which he considered a retrograde force. He emphasized reason and knowledge, and attacked autocracy and theocracy. He had a profound impact on the younger generation.

Alexander Herzen (1812–1870), was the son of a nobleman who promoted Belinsky's ideas after his death in 1848. He was influenced by Voltaire, Schiller, Saint-Simon, Proudhon, and especially Hegel and Feuerbach. Herzen started as a liberal but increasingly adopted socialism. He left Russia permanently in 1847, but his newsletter Kolokol published in London from 1857 to 1867, was widely read. Herzen combined key ideas of the French Revolution and German idealism. He disliked bourgeois or middle-class values, and sought authenticity among the peasantry. He agitated for the emancipation of the Russian serfs, and after that took place in 1861 he enlarged his platform to include common ownership of land, government by the people and stronger individual rights.

== See also ==
- Decembrist revolt
- Freemasonry in Russia
- Pochvennichestvo, anti-Westernisation movement
- Slavophile
- Westernization
- Total Westernization
