= Alexander Druzhinin =

Russian writer, translator and magazine editor

- Александр Васильевич Дружинин
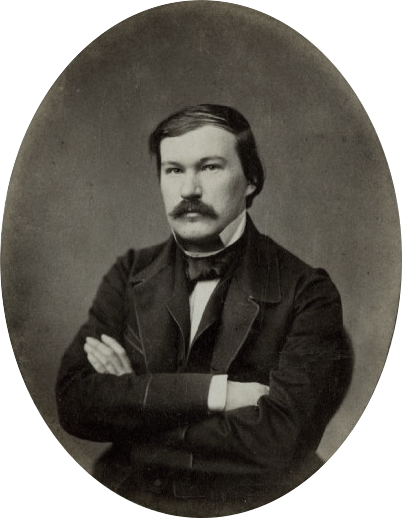
- Born: October 20, 1824; Golov, Saint Petersburg Governorate, Russian Empire
- Died: January 31, 1864 (aged 39); Saint Petersburg, Russian Empire
- Occupations: Writer, translator, magazine editor

Alexander Vasilyevich Druzhinin (Russian: Алекса́ндр Васи́льевич Дружи́нин), (October 20, 1824 – January 31, 1864), was a Russian writer, translator, and magazine editor.

== Biography ==
Druzhinin was born into a wealthy family in the district of Golov, part of Saint Petersburg Governorate. He was educated at home until the age of sixteen, and then sent to military school. Upon graduation in 1843, he joined the Life-Guards Finland Regiment of the Russian Imperial Guard, where he was chosen as regimental librarian. In 1846 he retired from the military and took up a civil service post. He left the civil service after five years in order to devote himself entirely to literary pursuits.

From 1848 to 1855 he was the literary editor of the important journal Sovremennik (The Contemporary). During this time he published a large number of short novels, stories, and feuilletons, translated various works of English literature into Russian and wrote a biography of the painter Pavel Fedotov.

In 1847 he published his most popular work, the epistolary novella Polinka Saks. He followed this up with The Story of Aleksei Dmitrich in 1848. Both were published in Sovremennik, and received praise from the prominent critic Vissarion Belinsky. After the death of Belinsky in 1848, Druzhinin and Pavel Annenkov became Russia's most prominent critics. In a letter dated 25th October 1891 in which Leo Tolstoy detailed writers and their works which had exerted the greatest literary influence on him, he referred to Druzhinin's Polinka Saks (there spelt Sachs) as having had a "very great" influence on him in his early years.

After he left Sovremennik, he edited the journal The Library for Reading, where he espoused a conservative view of literature, denying that it should be subordinated to social and political aims, which was the approach advocated by Chernyshevsky and Dobrolyubov, the ideological voices of Sovremennik. Druzhinin became one of the chief proponents of the aesthetic movement in Russian literature, along with Pavel Annenkov and Vasily Botkin.

Druzhinin was also the major initiator of the Literary Fund, an organization whose purpose was to give financial assistance to needy writers. Fyodor Dostoyevsky served as secretary to the fund between 1863 and 1865. Dostoyevsky also participated with Druzhinin in fundraising for the organization.

Druzhinin was on friendly terms with many of his more famous contemporaries, including Leo Tolstoy, Alexander Ostrovsky, and Ivan Turgenev, whom he exchanged letters with. He died of tuberculosis in 1864, aged nearly forty; he was interred into the Smolensky Cemetery.

== English literature ==
Druzhinin worked hard to acquaint Russian readers with English literature. He translated three of Shakespeare's plays: King Lear, Coriolanus and Richard III. He published a series of essays entitled Boswell and Johnson, about English life in the eighteenth century, and he wrote a life of George Crabbe which included numerous extracts from his poetry.

== Editions in English ==
- Polinka Saks, and The Story of Aleksei Dmitrich, Translated by Michael R. Katz, Northwestern University Press, 1992. ISBN 0-8101-1052-0
