= Sovremennik =

Russian literary, social and political magazine

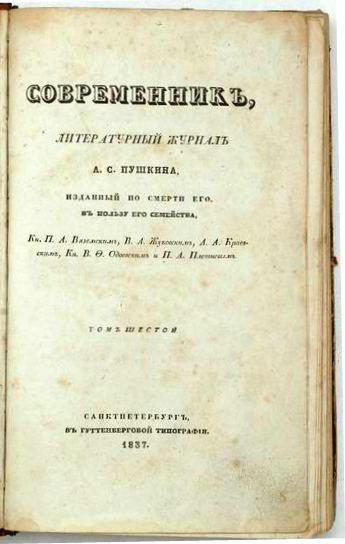
- The title page of the issue printed after the death of Alexander Pushkin
- First issue: 1836
- Final issue: 1866
- Based in: St. Petersburg
- Language: Russian

Sovremennik (Russian: «Современник», IPA: [səvrʲɪˈmʲenʲːɪk], "The Contemporary") was a Russian literary, social and political magazine, published in Saint Petersburg in 1836–1866. It came out four times a year in 1836–1843 and once a month after that. The magazine published poetry, prose, critical, historical, ethnographic and other material.

Sovremennik originated as a private enterprise of Alexander Pushkin who was running out of money to support his growing family. To assist him with the magazine, the poet asked Nikolai Gogol, Pyotr Vyazemsky and Vladimir Odoyevsky to contribute their works to the journal. It was there that the first substantial assortment of Fyodor Tyutchev's poems was published. Soon it became clear that Pushkin's establishment could not compete with Faddey Bulgarin's journal, which published more popular and less demanding literature. Sovremennik was out of date and could not command a paying audience.

When Pushkin died, his friend Pyotr Pletnyov took over the editorship in 1838. A few years later the magazine fell into decline, and Pletnyov handed it over to Nikolay Nekrasov and Ivan Panaev in 1847. It was Nekrasov who really made the magazine profitable. He enlisted the services of Ivan Turgenev, Ivan Goncharov, Alexander Herzen and Nikolai Ogaryov. Sovremennik was the first to publish translated works by Charles Dickens, George Sand and other best-selling foreign writers.

Although the magazine was owned and run by Nekrasov, its official editor-in-chief was Alexander Nikitenko. The virulent realist critic Vissarion Belinsky was responsible for its ideology. His criticism of present-day reality and propaganda of democratic ideas made the journal very popular among the Russian intelligentsia. Sovremennik's circulation was 3,100 copies in 1848.

During the reactionary reign of Nicholas I, the journal had to struggle against censorship and complaints of disgruntled aristocracy. Its position grew more complicated after Herzen's emigration (1847) and Belinsky's death (1848). Despite these hardships, Sovremennik published works by the best Russian authors of the day: Leo Tolstoy, Turgenev and Nekrasov. Timofey Granovsky, Sergey Solovyov and other leading historians were published as well.

The period between 1852 and 1862 is considered to be the most brilliant in the history of the journal. Nekrasov managed to strike a deal with its leading contributors, whereby their new works were to be published exclusively by him. As regards ideology, Sovremennik grew more radical together with its audience. Belinsky was succeeded by Nikolai Chernyshevsky in 1853 and by Nikolai Dobrolyubov. All their principal articles were published in Sovremennik.

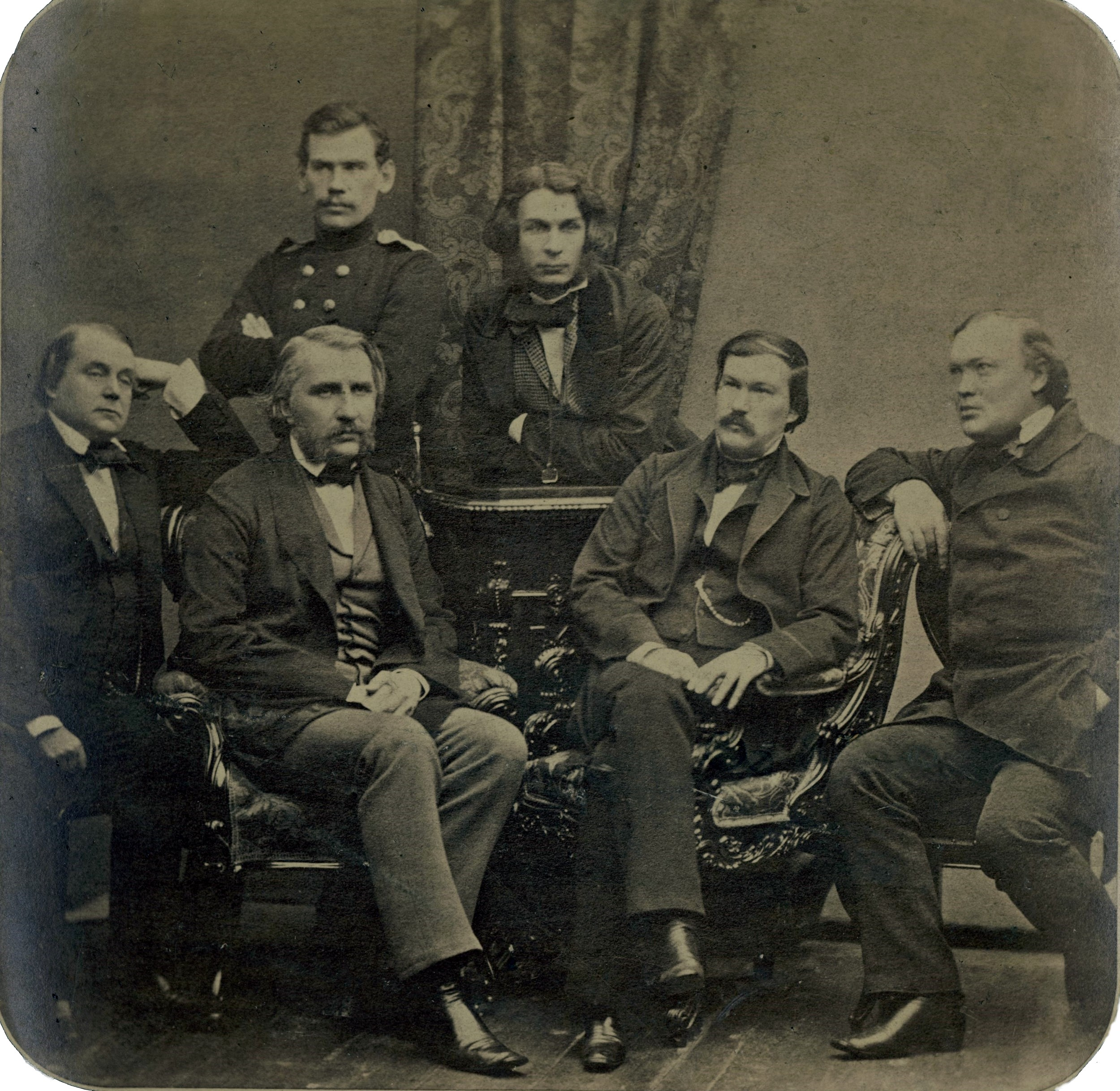
Most popular contributors to Sovremennik in 1856 (left to right): Ivan Goncharov, Ivan Turgenev, Leo Tolstoy, Dmitri Grigorovich, Alexander Druzhinin and Aleksandr Ostrovsky

In late 1858, the magazine entered into polemics with the liberal and conservative press and became a platform for and ideological center of the revolutionary democracy, turning into a political magazine. In 1861, it published materials, dedicated to the emancipation of the serfs and advocated the interests of serfs in the strongest terms possible. In 1859-1861, Sovremennik argued with Herzen's Kolokol about the aims of the Russian democracy.

Such a radical stance alienated those writers who were indifferent to politics or personally disliked revolutionary intelligentsia. Although Tolstoy, Turgenev, and Dmitry Grigorovich eventually left the magazine, Sovremennik's circulation reached 7,126 copies in 1861. The death of Dobrolyubov in 1861, an 8-month suspension of publishing activities (in June 1862), and Chernyshevsky's arrest caused irreparable damage to the magazine. Its ideological stance became less clear and consistent.

In 1863, Nekrasov managed to resume publishing Sovremennik. He invited Mikhail Saltykov-Shchedrin (stayed until 1864), Maxim Antonovich, Grigory Yeliseyev and Alexander Pypin to join its editorial staff. Controversy among the members of the editorial staff soon resulted in adoption of a more temperate policy.

In 1863-1866, Sovremennik published Chernyshevsky's What Is to Be Done? (written in the Peter and Paul Fortress), satires by Saltykov-Shchedrin, and works by the so-called plebeian authors (Vasily Sleptsov, Fyodor Reshetnikov, Gleb Uspensky). The magazine was closed down in June 1866, owing to the official panic that followed the first attempt on Alexander II's life. After that, Nekrasov and Saltykov-Schedrin acquired the rights to publish the Otechestvennye Zapiski, a literary journal widely viewed as Sovremennik's successor.

Sovremennik inspired Al Nafais Al Asriyyah, an Arabic literary and political magazine which was published in Jerusalem between 1908 and 1923.

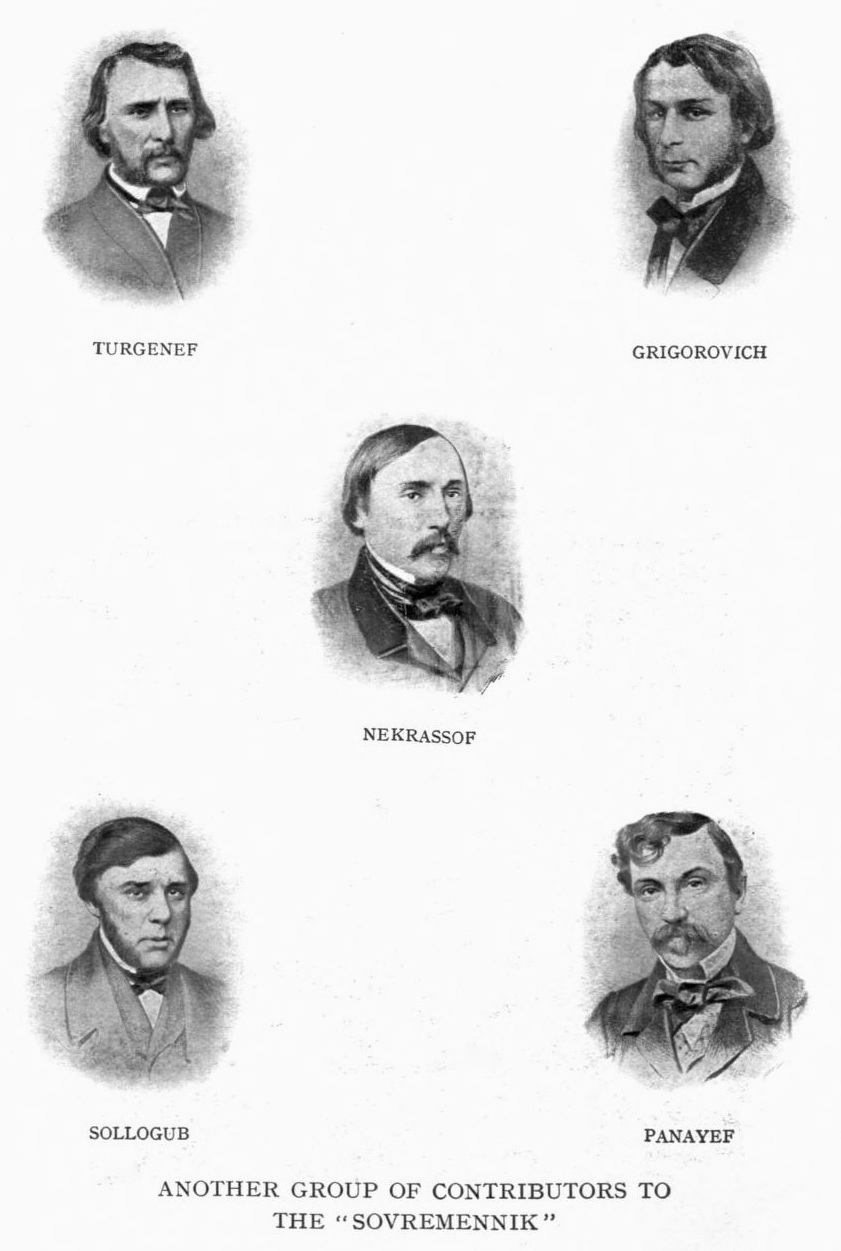
Contributors to Sovremennik

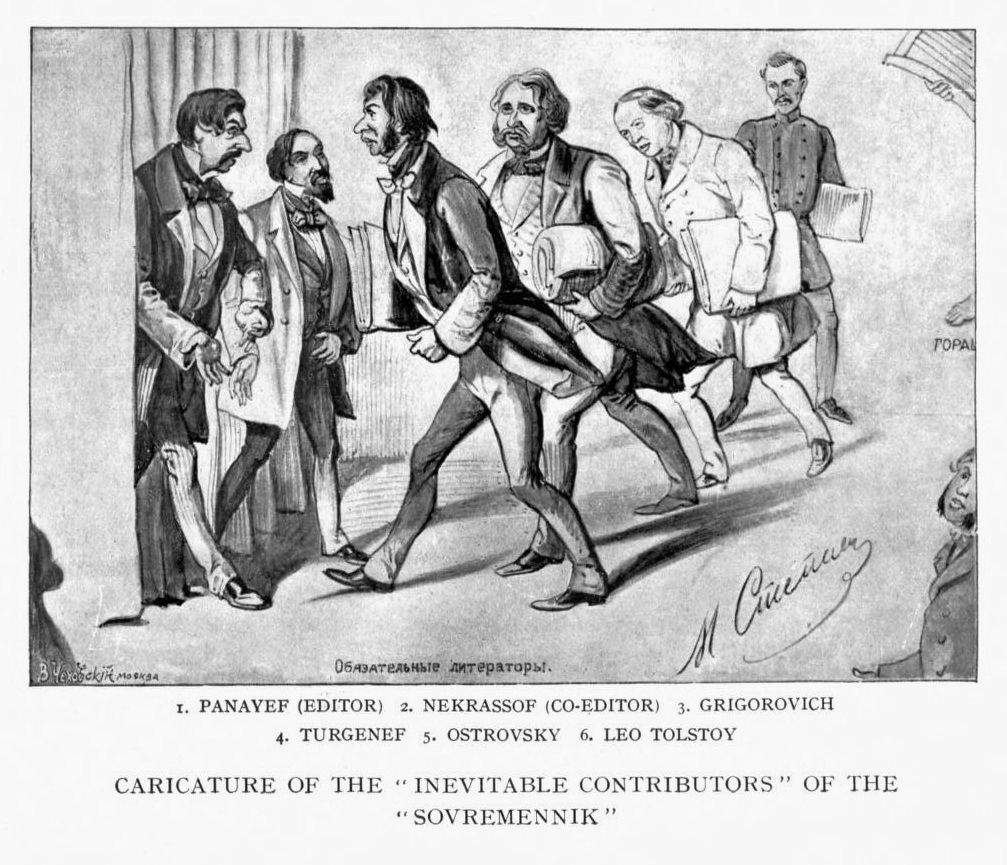
"Inevitable Contributors"

== Featured titles ==
- Nikolai Chernyshevsky
  - What Is to Be Done? (1863)
- Nikolai Gogol
  - "The Nose" (1836)
- Ivan Goncharov
  - The Same Old Story (1847)
- Mikhail Lermontov
  - Borodino (1837)
- Nikolai Nekrasov
  - Korobeiniki (1861)
  - Who Is Happy in Russia? (1863-1876)
- Alexander Pushkin
  - The Captain's Daughter (1836)
  - The Bronze Horseman (1837)
- Leo Tolstoy
  - Childhood (1852)
  - Boyhood (1854)
  - Sevastopol Sketches (1855)
  - "The Snowstorm" (1856)
  - Youth (1857)
- Ivan Turgenev
  - A Sportsman's Sketches (1852)
  - "Mumu" (1854)
  - Rudin (1856)
  - Home of the Gentry (1859)
- Alexander Sukhovo-Kobylin
  - Krechinsky's Wedding (1855)
