= Vissarion Belinsky =

Russian literary critic (1811–1848)

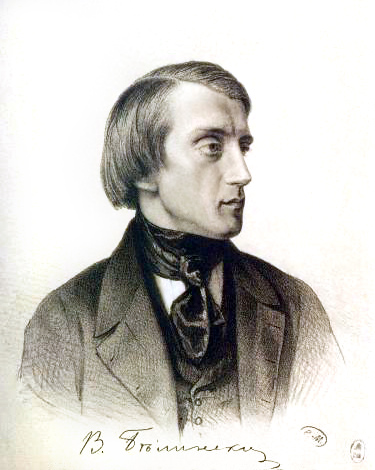
- Portrait lithograph by Kirill Gorbunov, 1843
- Born: Vissarion Grigoryevich Belinsky; 11 June 1811; Sveaborg, Grand Duchy of Finland, Russian Empire
- Died: 7 June 1848 (aged 36); Saint Petersburg, Russian Empire
- Resting place: Literatorskiye Mostki, Saint Petersburg
- Occupations: Editor of Sovremennik, and Otechestvennye Zapiski
- Writing career
- Period: 1830s–1840s
- Genre: Criticism
- Subject: Literature
- Movements: Westernizers; Russian Schellingianism

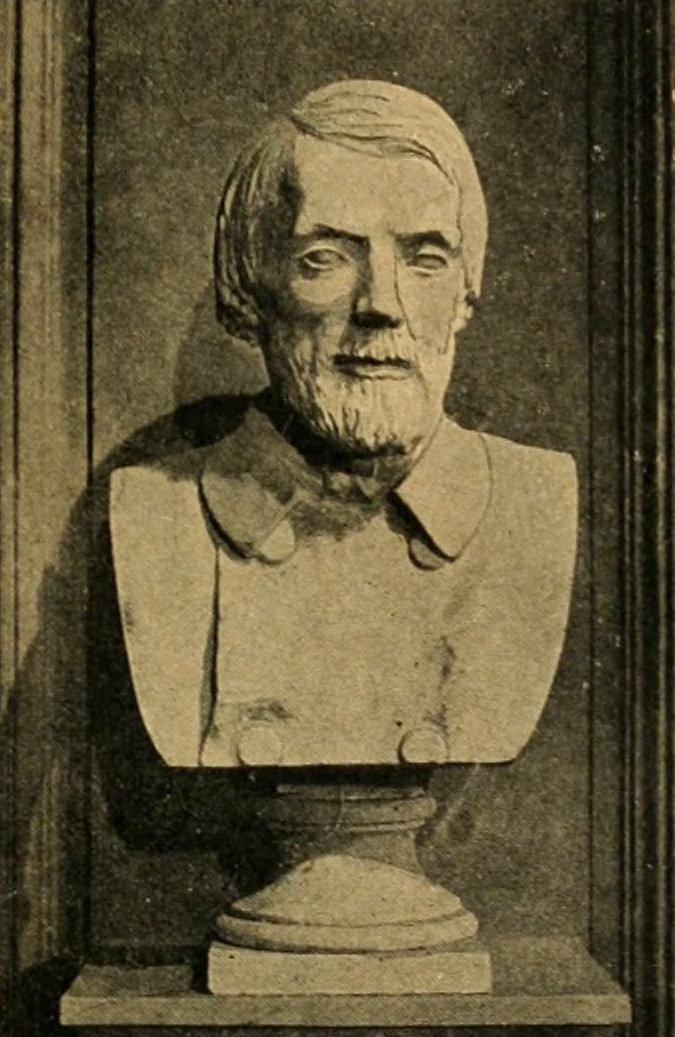
A bust of Belinsky

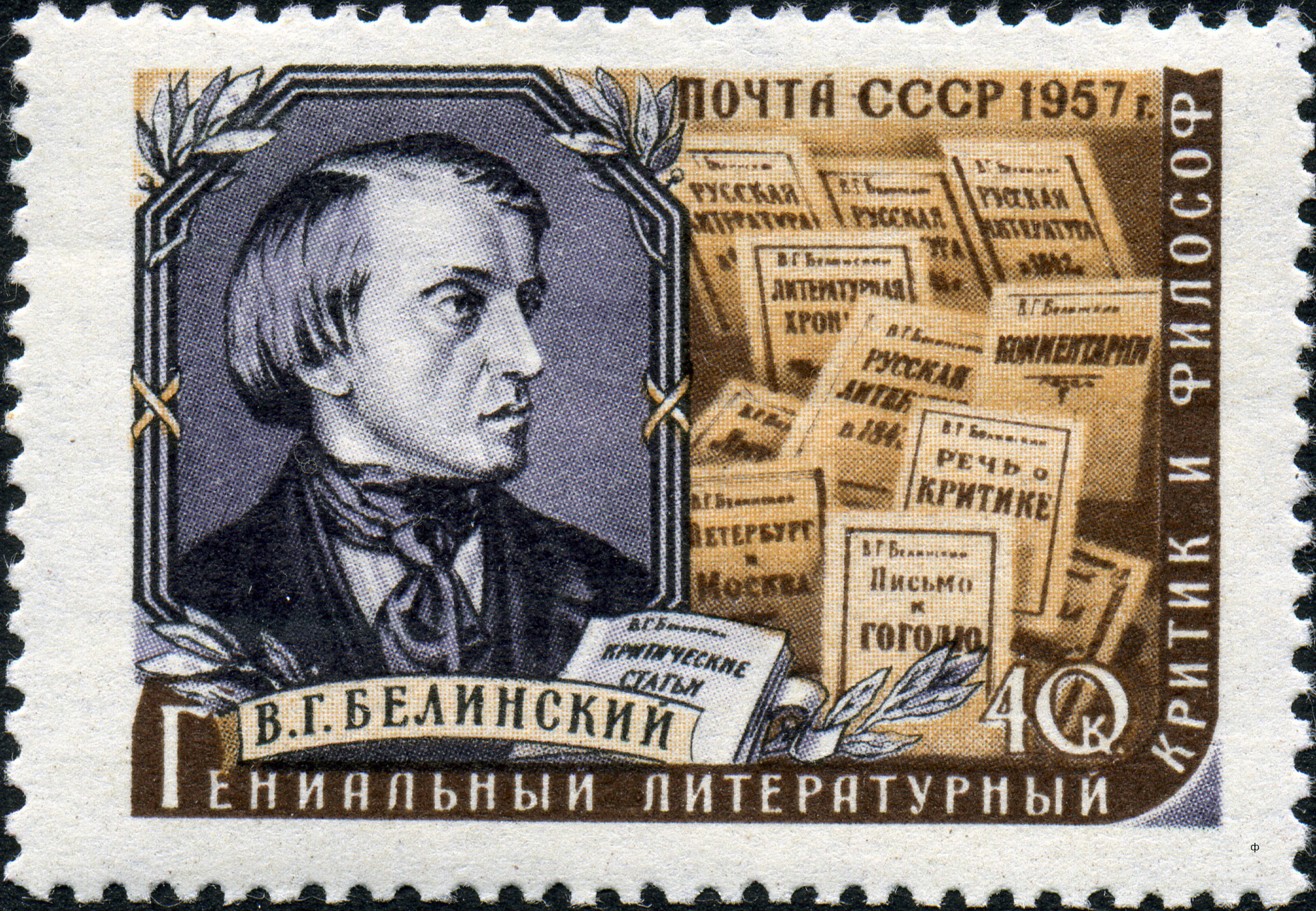
A 1957 Vissarion Belinsky Soviet postage stamp

Vissarion Grigoryevich Belinsky (Russian: Виссарион Григорьевич Белинский; (Note: Pre-reform spelling: Виссаріонъ Григорьевичъ Бѣлинскій.) 11 June [O.S. 30 May] 1811 – 7 June [O.S. 26 May] 1848) was a Russian literary critic of Westernizing tendency. Belinsky played one of the key roles in the career of poet and publisher Nikolay Nekrasov and his popular magazine Sovremennik. He was the most influential of the Westernizers, especially among the younger generation. He worked primarily as a literary critic, because that area was less heavily censored than political pamphlets. He agreed with Slavophiles that society had precedence over individualism, but he insisted the society had to allow the expression of individual ideas and rights. He strongly opposed Slavophiles on the role of Orthodoxy, which he considered a retrograde force. He emphasized reason and knowledge, and attacked autocracy and theocracy.

== Biography ==
Born in Sveaborg, part of Helsinki, Vissarion Belinsky lived in the town of Chembar (now Belinsky in Belinsky District of Penza Oblast) and in Penza, where he studied in gymnasia (1825–1829). In 1829–1832 he was a student of Moscow University. In Moscow he published his first famous articles.

In 1839 Belinsky went to St. Petersburg, Russia, where he became a respected critic and editor of two major literary magazines: Otechestvennye Zapiski ("Notes of the Fatherland"), and Sovremennik ("The Contemporary"). In both magazines Belinsky worked with younger Nikolay Nekrasov.

He was unlike most of the other Russian intellectuals of the 1830s and 1840s. The son of a rural medical doctor, he was not a wealthy aristocrat. The fact that Belinsky was relatively underprivileged meant, among other effects, that he was mainly self-educated; this was partly due to being expelled from Moscow University for political activity. But it was less for his philosophical skill that Belinsky was admired and more for emotional commitment and fervor. "For me, to think, to feel, to understand and to suffer are one and the same thing," he liked to say. This was, of course, true to the Romantic ideal, to the beliefs that real understanding comes not only from mere thinking (reason), but also from intuitive insight. This combination of thinking and feeling pervaded Belinsky's life.

Ideologically, Belinsky shared, but with exceptional intellectual and moral passion, the central value of most of Westernizer intelligentsia: the notion of the individual self, a person (lichnost), that which makes people human, and gives them dignity and rights. With this idea in hand (achieved through a complex intellectual struggle), he faced the world around him armed to do battle. He took on much conventional philosophical thinking among educated Russians, including the dry and abstract philosophizing of the German idealists and their Russian followers although maintaining the perspective of literary realism in his critical writings. In his words, "What is it to me that the Universal exists when the individual personality [lichnost] is suffering." Or: "The fate of the individual, of the person, is more important than the fate of the whole world." Also upon this principle, Belinsky constructed an extensive critique of the world around him (especially the Russian one). He bitterly criticized autocracy and serfdom (as "trampling upon everything that is even remotely human and noble") but also poverty, prostitution, drunkenness, bureaucratic coldness, and cruelty toward the less powerful (including women).

Belinsky worked most of his short life as a literary critic. His writings on literature were inseparable from these moral judgments. Belinsky believed that the only realm of freedom in the repressive reign of Nicholas I was through the written word. What Belinsky required most of a work of literature was "truth." This meant not only a probing portrayal of real life (he hated works of mere fantasy, or escape, or aestheticism), but also commitment to "true" ideas — the correct moral stance (above all this meant a concern for the dignity of individual people): As he told Nikolai Gogol (in a famous letter) the public "is always ready to forgive a writer for a bad book [i.e. aesthetically bad], but never for a pernicious one [ideologically and morally bad]." Belinsky viewed Gogol's recent book, Correspondence with Friends, as pernicious because it renounced the need to "awaken in the people a sense of their human dignity, trampled down in the mud and the filth for so many centuries."

Fyodor Dostoevsky read aloud at several public events Belinsky's letter, which called for the end of serfdom. A secret press was assembled to print and distribute Belinsky's letter. For these offenses Dostoevsky was arrested, convicted and condemned to death in 1849, a sentence later commuted to 4 years incarceration in the prison camps of Siberia.

In his role as perhaps the most influential liberal critic and ideologist of his day, Belinsky advocated literature that was socially conscious. He hailed Fyodor Dostoyevsky's first novel, Poor Folk (1845); however, Dostoevsky soon thereafter broke with Belinsky.

Inspired by these ideas, which led to thinking about radical changes in society's organization, Belinsky began to call himself a socialist starting in 1841. Among his last great efforts were his move to join Nikolay Nekrasov in the popular magazine The Contemporary (Sovremennik), where the two critics established the new literary center of St. Petersburg and Russia. At that time Belinsky published his Literary Review for the Year 1847.

In 1848, shortly before his death, Belinsky granted full rights to Nikolay Nekrasov and his magazine, The Contemporary (Sovremennik), to publish various articles and other material originally planned for an almanac, to be called the Leviathan.

Belinsky died of consumption on the eve of his arrest by the Tsar's police on account of his political views. In 1910, Russia celebrated the centenary of his birth with enthusiasm and appreciation.

His works, in twelve volumes, were first published in 1859–1862. Following the expiration of the copyright in 1898, several new editions appeared. The best of these is by S. Vengerov; it is supplied with profuse notes.

Belinsky early supported the work of Ivan Turgenev. The two became close friends and Turgenev fondly recalls Belinsky in his book Literary Reminiscences and Autobiographical Fragments. The British writer Isaiah Berlin has a chapter on Belinsky on his 1978 book Russian Thinkers. Here he points out some deficiencies of Belinsky's critical insight:

He was wildly erratic, and all his enthusiasm and seriousness and integrity do not make up for lapses of insight or intellectual power. He declared that Dante was not a poet; that Fenimore Cooper was the equal of Shakespeare; that Othello was the product of a barbarous age...

But further on in the same essay, Berlin remarks:

Because he was naturally responsive to everything that was living and genuine, he transformed the concept of the critic's calling in his native country. The lasting effect of his work was in altering and altering crucially and irretrievably, the moral and social outlook of the leading younger writers and thinkers of his time. He altered the quality and the tone both of the experience and of the expression of so much Russian thought and feeling that his role as a dominant social influence overshadows his attainments as a literary critic.

Berlin's book introduced Belinsky to playwright Tom Stoppard, who included Belinsky as one of the principal characters in his trilogy of plays about Russian writers and activists: The Coast of Utopia (2002)

== Legacy ==
Belinsky Street and Belinsky Lane, close to Red Square in Moscow, were named after Belinsky from 1920 to 1994.

== English translations ==
- Selected Philosophical Works, Foreign Languages Publishing House, Moscow, 1956.
- Belinsky, Chernyshevsky & Dobrolyubov: Selected Criticism, Indiana University Press, Bloomington, 1976.
