= Alexander Mozhaysky =

Russian admiral and aviation pioneer (1825–1890)

- Александр Можайский
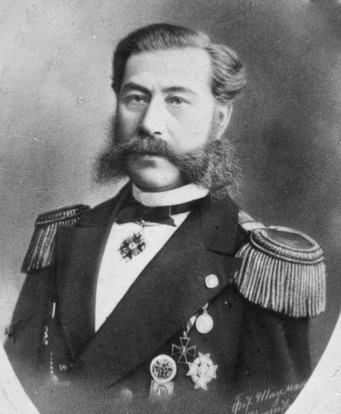
- Alexander Mozhayskiy
- Born: 21 March 1825; Rochensalm, Grand Duchy of Finland, Russian Empire
- Died: 1 April 1890 (aged 65); St Petersburg, Russian Empire
- Military career
- Allegiance: Russia
- Branch: Imperial Russian Navy
- Service years: 1841–1882
- Rank: Rear admiral
- Conflicts: Crimean War
- Awards: Order of St. Vladimir, 4th class Order of Saint Stanislaus, 2nd class

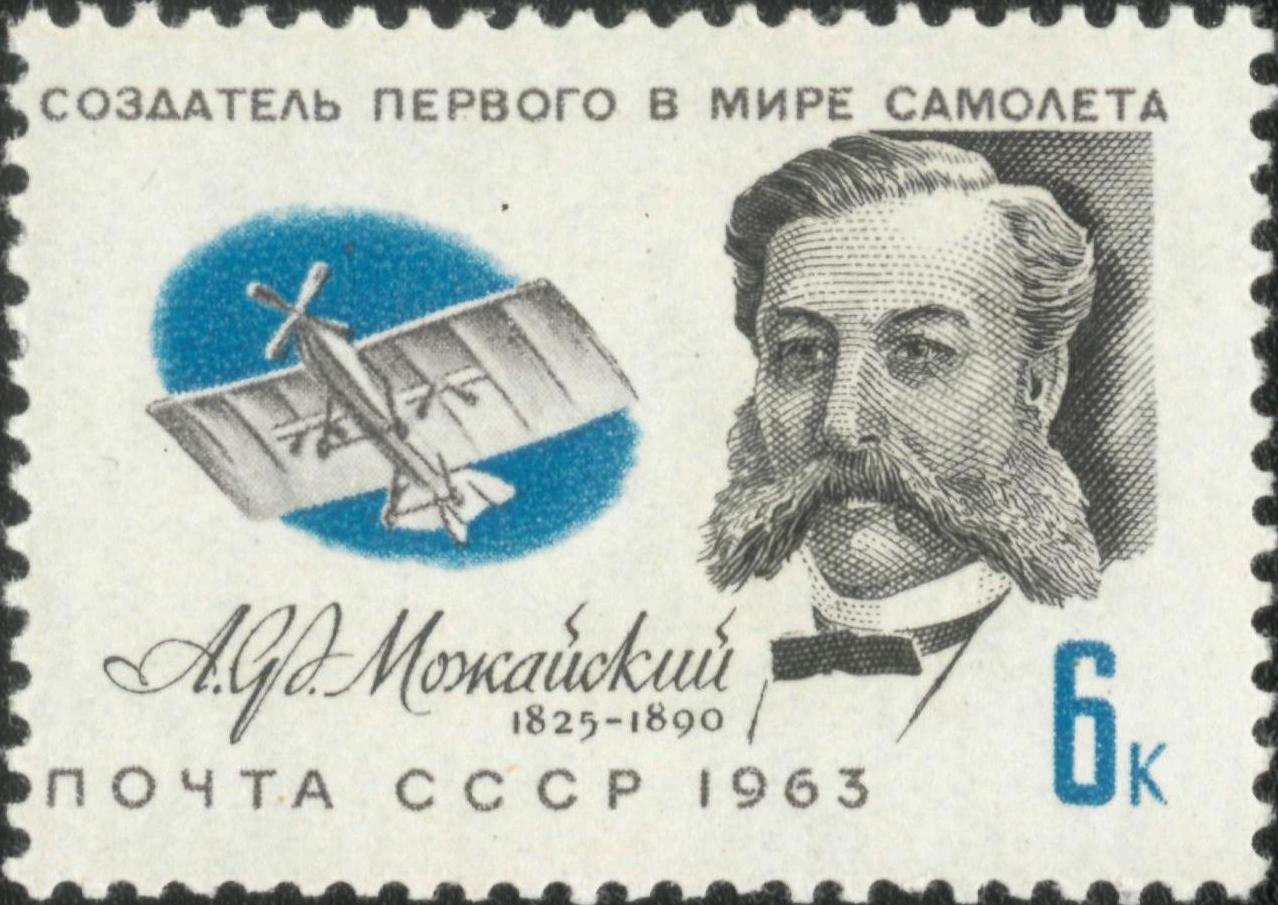
Mozhaysky, identified as the "Creator of world's first airplane", on a 1963 Soviet postal stamp.

Alexander Fedorovich Mozhaysky (also transliterated as Mozhayski, Mozhayskii and Mozhayskiy; Russian: Алекса́ндр Фёдорович Можа́йский) (21 March [O.S. 9 March] 1825 – 1 April [O.S. 20 March] 1890) was an admiral in the Imperial Russian Navy, an aviation pioneer, and a researcher and designer of heavier-than-air craft.

== Biography ==
Mozhaysky was born in Rochensalm, in the Grand Duchy of Finland (present-day Kotka), southern Finland, then part of the Russian Empire. His father was an admiral in the Imperial Russian Navy, and Mozhaysky graduated from the Sea Cadet Corps in 1841. He spent the next seven years on voyages in the Baltic Sea and in the White Sea on various vessels, and was commissioned as a lieutenant in 1849. He served with the Baltic Fleet from 1850 to 1852. In 1853 he was selected as a member of Vice Admiral Yevfimy Putyatin’s expedition to the Far East. In August 1853, he demonstrated a working model of a steam engine to various Japanese dignitaries at Nagasaki, from which Japanese inventor Tanaka Hisashige was later able to reverse-engineer a Japanese version. In December 1854 he was shipwrecked at Heda, Shizuoka when the frigate Diana sank in the 1854 Ansei-Tōkai earthquake. Mozhaysky assisted in the construction of the schooner Heda in 1855, which enabled the Russian delegation negotiating the Treaty of Shimoda to return home. Later in 1855, during the Crimean War, he served in the Gulf of Finland on the brig Antenor.

In 1858 Mozhaysky was selected to participate in an expedition to Khiva in Central Asia, and published an account of the Aral Sea and the Amu Darya River. He was awarded the Order of St Vladimir, 4th class, for his participation in this expedition. After his return he was made a lieutenant-commander; however, he resigned his commission in 1863 with the downsizing of the Russian navy following the end (1856) of the Crimean War. From 1869 to 1876 he lived outside the city of Vinnytsia in what is now Ukraine.

Mozhaisky's aircraft patent

Mozhaysky began work on a project to develop a heavier-than-air aircraft from 1876. Mozhaysky re-enlisted in the navy in 1879 and was granted the rank of captain, 1st class. He became an instructor at the Sea Cadet Corps. He was promoted to rear admiral in July 1882, but resigned shortly thereafter for domestic reasons. Approximately in 1884 Mozhaysky's airplane made its first flight. His design relied upon a ramp rather than on engine power to generate sufficient speed for lift. The wing design of his craft lacked the curvature necessary to generate lift. While it is possible that Mozhaysky's wings slowed his monoplane's descent after launch from the ramp, the wings were unlikely ever to have provided sufficient lift for sustained flight unless used at angles of attack that would have been impractical, given the engines available to Mozhaysky. He also experimented with different angles of attack.

Mozhaysky died on April 1, 1890, from pneumonia; his tomb is at the Smolensk Cemetery in Saint Petersburg.

== Legacy ==
In 1909 a Russian newspaper claimed Mozhaysky's hop was the first powered flight. This claim was later repeated in many Soviet publications. In 1971-1981 Central Aerohydrodynamic Institute researched the topic and disproved the claim. Mozhaysky's original aircraft was found incapable of generating lift because of low engine capacity. It was also shown that with a more powerful engine, which Mozhaysky had planned shortly before his death, the aircraft might have been able to fly.

Nevertheless, Mozhaysky's aviation achievements, particularly with regard to flight controls and propulsion, were considerable given the limits of the technology available to him, and have only recently received serious attention.

The A.F. Mozhaysky Military-Space Academy in St Peterburg and asteroid 2850 Mozhaiskij are named in his honour.

== See also ==
- Early flying machines
- Samuel Pierpont Langley, a U.S. scientist notable for his early powered aircraft flight attempts
- Clément Ader, a French inventor who designed a series of early steam-powered aircraft
- Mozhaysky's airplane
