= Russian frigate Pallada =

Russian 19th-century frigate

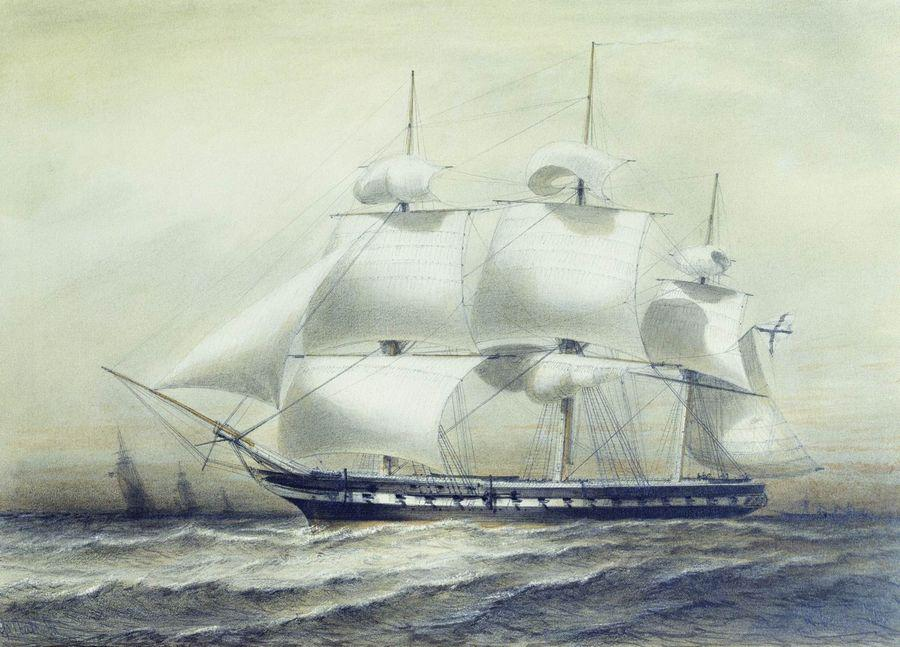
- Painting by Alexey Bogolyubov

History

Russian Empire
- Name: Pallada
- Builder: Admiralty Shipyard
- Laid down: November 14, 1831
- Launched: September 13, 1832
- In service: August 1833
- Fate: scuttled by crew in 1856

General characteristics
- Class & type: Frigate
- Tons burthen: 2090 tons
- Length: 52.73 metres (173.0 ft)
- Beam: 13.31 metres (43.7 ft)
- Draught: 7.01 metres (23.0 ft)
- Sail plan: Full-rigged ship
- Speed: 12 knots
- Complement: 426
- Armament: 30 × 24-pounder guns; 22 × 24-pounder carronades

Pallada (Russian: Паллада) was a sail frigate of the Imperial Russian Navy, most noted for its service as flagship of Vice Admiral Yevfimy Putyatin during his visit to Japan in 1853, which later resulted in the signing of the Treaty of Shimoda of 1855, establishing formal relations between the two countries. In addition to her diplomatic mission, her crew also conducted numerous geographical and natural studies in the Far East. She was scuttled by her own crew in the Crimean War due to the poor condition of her hull in 1855.

== Construction ==
Pallada was built at the Admiralty Shipyard in St Petersburg, with her hull design based on the British frigate HMS President (1829), which in turn was based after an American frigate, President which had been captured as a prize of war by the Royal Navy during the War of 1812. The ship was intended from the start for use by members of the Russian imperial family on diplomatic missions, and Tsar Nicholas I issued an imperial rescript commanding that the vessel incorporate all of the latest innovations. After launching, she was based at Kronstadt with the Baltic Fleet and was assigned to the command of Captain Pavel Nakhimov, one of the ablest commanders in the Russian Navy. She entered active service in early August 1833.

== Description ==
Pallada was a three-masted frigate of wooden construction, with a transverse steel reinforcement skeleton in her hull. The length of the hull, at the height of the main deck battery, was 52.73 m (173.0 ft) (without bowsprit), the maximum interior width was 13.31 m (43.7 ft). Her hull was sheathed in copper sheets, to prevent destruction of the wood by marine organisms. A novelty on the Russian ships at the time was the use of portholes for lighting crew spaces on the lower deck.

Nominally, Pallada was classified as 44-gun frigate (Fifth-rate); however, her actual weaponry in service consisted of 30 × 24-pounder guns on her upper deck and 22 × 24-pounder carronades on her quarterdeck and forecastle. Her crew numbered 426 men.

== Service record ==
In 1834, Pallada transported the future Frederick William IV of Prussia on a state visit to Russia. From 1835 to 1836 she served in various ports in the Baltic and in 1837 was tasked with carrying gold bullion to London on a special mission for the Russian embassy. She served until 1846 as a training ship for cadets. She underwent a complete overhaul from 1846 to 1848, and afterwards was assigned to the Mediterranean, calling on Madeira and Lisbon in 1849 and was frequently the flagship for Grand Duke Konstantin Nikolayevich of Russia.

In 1852, Pallada was assigned to a special expedition to the Far East under the command of Admiral Ivan Unkovsky, a member of the Unkovsky noble family, as the flagship of Vice Admiral Yevfimy Putyatin. On his expedition, Putyatin was accompanied by Alexander Mozhaysky and a secretary, the writer Ivan Goncharov, who wrote a travelogue, Fregat Pallada (The Frigate Pallas), published in 1858 ("Pallada" is the Russian spelling of "Pallas").

She departed Kronstadt on October 19, 1852, but was forced to dock at Portsmouth in England for repairs lasting a month. In January 1853, Admiral Unkovsky decided not to risk Cape Horn, but to follow the route to Asia around the Cape of Good Hope and the Indian Ocean. She spent over a month in South Africa for repairs and for collecting specimens of local flora and fauna, and crossed to the Sunda Strait in mid-May, where Putyatin sent a cable to St Petersburg requesting the dispatch of the newly built Diana due to repeated problems with Pallada. After calling on Singapore and Java, followed by Hong Kong, she reached the Bonin Islands by July 9 but was there demasted by a typhoon. While under repairs, her crew took the opportunity to explore the archipelago.

Pallada finally arrived in Nagasaki on August 12, 1853, just one month after the first visit of Commodore Perry to Uraga outside of Edo Bay. Treaty negotiations with the Japanese were difficult and protracted, and Putyatin sent the ship on a number of survey missions around the Japanese coast.

After the arrival of Diana, the diplomatic crew transferred to the newer vessel while Pallada was sent to survey the coasts of Korea and the Russian Maritime Province. While at Imperatorskaya Gavan on 22 May her crew learned of the outbreak of the Crimean War with Britain and France. Unable to enter the Amur River because of her draft, she overwintered at Imperatorskaya Gavan. In the spring of 1855, Admiral Vasily Zavoyko, who was also military governor of Petropavlovsk, surveyed Pallada and declared her unfit for active service. She was left under a skeleton crew until January 1856, until orders were received to scrap her in January 1856.

As the ship was only at a depth of 20 meters, it was common for Russian, and later Japanese, divers to retrieve small items from the sunken vessel as souvenirs.
