= Ivan Unkovsky =

Russian admiral (1822–1886)

Ivan Semionovitch Unkovsky
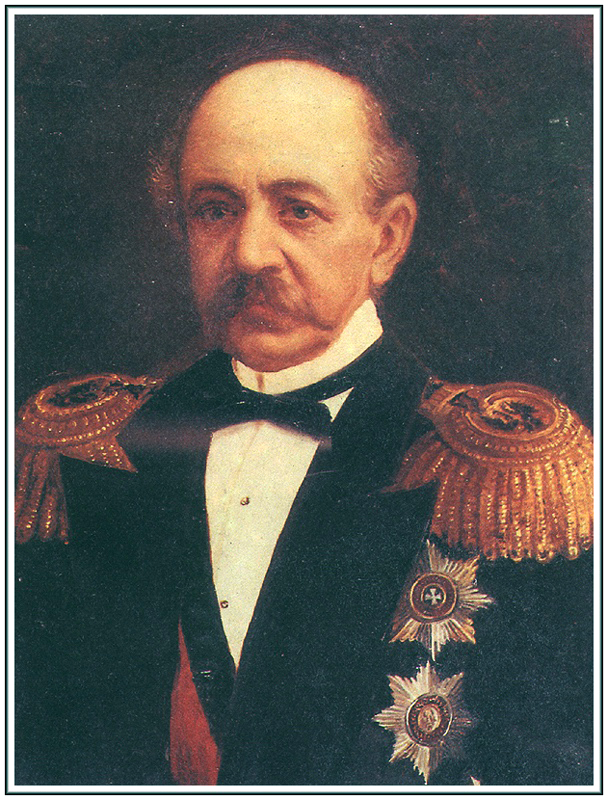
- Admiral Ivan Semionovitch Unkovsky
- Born: 29 March 1822; Kolyshevo, Peremyshlsky Uyezd, Kaluga Governorate, Russian Empire
- Died: 11 August 1886 (aged 64)
- Military career
- Allegiance: Russian Empire
- Branch: Imperial Russian Navy
- Service years: 1839-1861
- Rank: Vice Admiral

Ivan Semyonovich Unkovsky (Russian: Ива́н Семёнович У́нковский; 29 March 1822 – 11 August 1886), was an admiral, explorer and surveyor of the Imperial Russian Navy. After his navy years, Unkovsky served as a military and civil governor of Yaroslav.

== Biography ==
Unkovsky was born in Kolyshevo, in the Peremyshlsky Uyezd of Kaluga Governorate, into the ancient noble family of Unkovsky (stolbovoye dvoryanstvo), where his father was an officer in the Imperial Russian Navy.

In 1835, on the personal recommendation of Tsar Nicholas I, he entered the Sea Cadet Corps, from which he graduated in 1839. He was assigned to the Baltic Fleet on the brig Kazarsky in 1840. However, in spring 1841, at the request of his father, he transferred to the Black Sea Fleet at Mykolaiv(Nikolaev), serving on numerous vessels through 1843, gathering intelligence on the status of foreign navies and political environment in the Balkans and the eastern Mediterranean. He was awarded the Order of St Stanislav (3rd class) and the Order of St Anna (3rd class). From 1846, he commanded the yacht and participated in manly sailing competitions, winning several awards, including the imperial prize in a three-month-long race from the Black Sea to the Baltic, via Gibraltar. In 1849, he was appointed commander of the brig Aeneas, and from 1850 to 1851 was assigned to intelligence gathering missions in the Mediterranean. He was appointed an adjunct to Tsar Nicholas I in 1851.

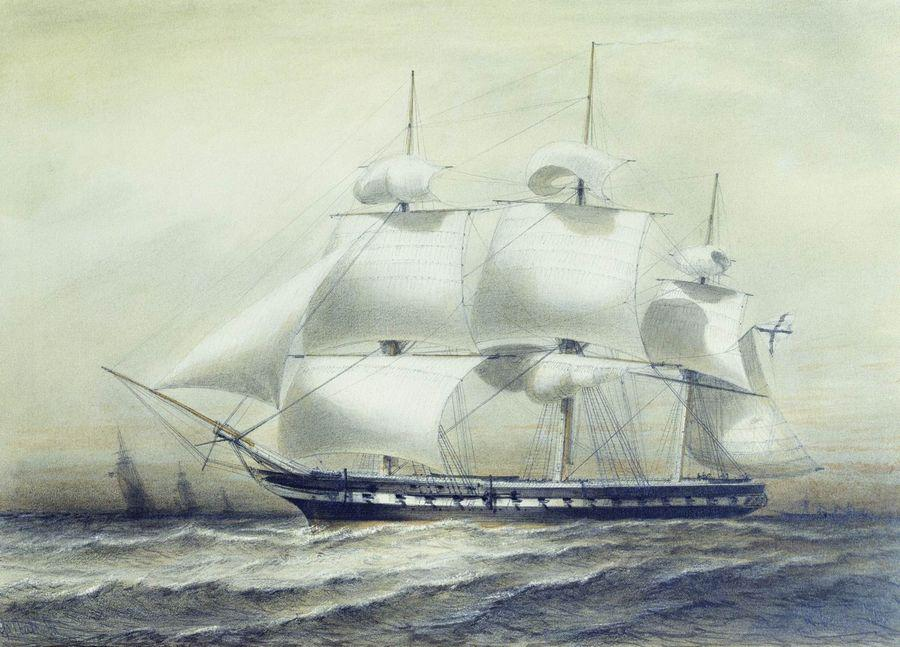
The Russian frigate Pallada

As commander of the frigate Pallada in 1852, he participated in the secret diplomatic mission to Japan, headed by Vice-Admiral Yevfimy Putyatin. The fleet reached Nagasaki in Japan in 1853, contributing many important discoveries in oceanography along the way. The expedition also led to the signing of the Treaty of Shimoda, a commercial treaty between Japan and Russia which was followed by the opening of the Russian foreign settlement at Nagasaki.

Unkovsky was promoted to captain, 2nd class in 1854 and was awarded the Order of St Anna, 2nd class in 1855. In the following years, from 1857 to 1860, he was commander of the frigate "Askold" in various missions in the Far East. He was promoted to rear admiral in 1860.

Returning to civilian life in 1861, he served as governor of Yaroslavl Governorate until 1873.

An island in the Nordenskiöld Archipelago was named after this Russian explorer.

== Decorations ==
- Order of St Vladimir 2nd class, 1st class
- Order of St. Alexander Nevsky
- Order of the White Eagle
- , Order of Saint Anna 3rd class, 2nd class, 1st class
- Order of St Stanislav 1st class

== See also ==
- Relations between the Empire of Japan and the Russian Empire
