= Stone Quarries for Edo Castle =

- 江戸城石垣石丁場跡 (Japanese)
- Periods: Edo period
- Location: Odawara, Kanagawa, Atami and Itō, Shizuoka. Japan
- Region: Chūbu region

History
- Built: 1603-1636

Site notes
- Public access: Yes (no public facilities)
- Stone Quarries for Edo Castle (Shizuoka Prefecture) Stone Quarries for Edo Castle (Japan)

The Stone Quarries for Edo Castle (江戸城石垣石丁場跡, Edojō Ishigaki ishichōba ato) are the remnants of stone quarries used to provide the massive amount of stone necessary to construct the extensive moats and defensive fortifications of Edo Castle under the Tokugawa shogunate in 17th century Japan. These sites are located in what are now the cities of Odawara, Kanagawa in Kanagawa Prefecture, and Atami and Itō, Shizuoka Prefecture. These 170 sites were collectively designated a National Historic Site of Japan in 2016.

== Background ==
Edo Castle and the city of Edo itself are located on largely reclaimed land in low lying alluvial plain at the northern end of Edo Bay. The geology of the area consists of the Kantō loam layer, and there are no naturally occurring stones suitable for use in construction. On the other hand, the Izu Peninsula and the western coast of Sagami province are volcanic in origin, and contain significant outcropping of andesite and granite suitable for stone walls. In addition, many of these outcrops were in close proximity to the sea, which permitted ease of transport of the heavy stones to Edo. Tokugawa Ieyasu ordered the various daimyō the task of rebuilding Edo Castle as the headquarters of the Tokugawa shogunate in 1603, with work continuing under his successors. Tokugawa Hidetada and Tokugawa Iemitsu. The buildings of the center of the castle took from 1604 to 1607, the outer enclosures from 1610 to 1627, and the outer moats from 1629 to 1636. At numerous times during the Edo period, the shogunate periodically assigned the task of repairing certain portions of the moats and other stone structures to the various daimyō clans, especially the tozama daimyō, partly as a measure to drain these clans of their financial resources, which would reduce the possibility of any rebellion.

The majority of the quarries for the stone required for this vast construction project are along the coast of Sagami Bay, ranging from the northeastern of the hills on the west bank of the Sakawa and Karikawa rivers in Odawara, Kanagawa to Shimoda at the southern end of the Izu Peninsula, and also in parts of the coast of Suruga Bay, from the town of Shimizu to Heda in Numazu. The quarries were not only for extraction of materials, but included workshops for the rough processing of stones to the necessary shape and sizes, a storage location, a towing facility and a port.

== Sites in Odawara, Kanagawa ==
The mountainous border between Sagami and Izu, namely the Hayakawa river valley, contained many outcroppings of stone forming part of the outer ring of the ancient Hakone volcano. Archaeologists have identified 19 locations with a total of 101 quarry sites, covering a total area of 254,127.39 square meters are located along the Hayakawa River. The latest and best-preserved site is Hayakawa quarry, which was excavated by the Odawara City Board of Education in 2003. Numerous stones with mason's marks and quarry holes were discovered. A further excavation in 2007 found the stone towing road to the port.

== Sites in Atami, Shizuoka ==
Some 30 quarry sites have been identified within the borders of Atami, which shares the same geology as the Hayakawa River area of Odawara. Many of the remaining worked stones have mason's marks or inscriptions, and the names of the Arima and Mōri daimyō clans have been found.

== Sites in Itō, Shizuoka ==
Former Usami village, within the city of Itō, was tenryō territory under the direct control of the shogunate, and occupies a peninsula jutting out into Sagami Bay. Much of the area is dominated by Mount Nako, with an elevation of 350 meters, whose southern slopes faced the northern side of Usami Bay. On this mountain more than 21 quarry sites have been identified and are covered by the National Historic Site designation. This includes the Usami quarry, which was one of the largest. Stones taken from this location were transported using rounded boulders as rollers to the harbor, 1.5 kilometers away. Many of the defective or unused stones left inset at various sites have inscriptions from the masons, and also naming the daimyō involved in the project. The sites in Mount Nako have many inscriptions indicating that the Hosokawa, Inaba and Mōri clans were prominent, although historical records indicate that many more daimyō used these sites as well.

== See also ==
- List of Historic Sites of Japan (Kanagawa)
- List of Historic Sites of Japan (Shizuoka)
