= Sergei Unkovsky =

Sergey Unkovsky
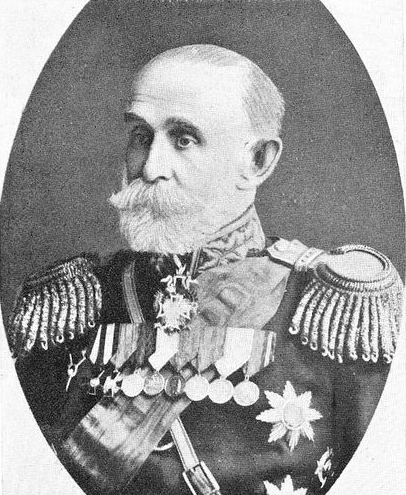
- Native name: Сергей Семенович Унковский
- Born: 2 October 1829
- Died: 26 February 1904 (aged 74)
- Known for: General of Artillery in the Imperial Russian Army, Commandant of Moscow, Veteran of the Crimean War
- Battles / wars: Crimean War (notably the Battle of Inkerman)
- Awards: Order of St. Anna (1st and 2nd class); Order of St. Vladimir (2nd, 3rd and 4th class); Order of the White Eagle; Order of St. Alexander Nevsky
- Spouse: Ekaterina Olive
- Children: Sergei, Sofia, Ekaterina, Varvara

Sergey Semyonovich Unkovsky (Russian: Сергей Семёнович Унковский; also spelled Ounkovski; 20 September [2 October] 1829 – 13 [26] February 1904) was a General of Artillery in the Imperial Russian Army, and the Commandant of Moscow.

== Early life and education ==
Sergey Semyonovich Unkovsky was born on 20 September (2 October) 1829 into the ancient noble family of Unkovsky. He was the eighth son of Semyon Yakovlevich Unkovsky. His childhood and youth were spent in Kaluga, where he received a home education equivalent to a gymnasium course under teachers of the Kaluga Gymnasium.

== Career ==
In July 1846, he entered military service as a cannoneer in the 18th Artillery Brigade. In 1848, already a junker, he was transferred to the light 3rd battery of the 17th Artillery Brigade. That same year, he passed the examination of the Artillery Department of the Military Education Committee and on 26 October was promoted to praporshchik.

As a lieutenant (from 6 September 1854), he took part in the Crimean War. At the Battle of Inkerman he was severely wounded: a shell fragment shattered his jaw and tongue, leaving him unrecognizable to his comrades. For bravery in this battle he was promoted to staff captain in January 1855 and in 1856 transferred to the 1st Guards Artillery Brigade. That year he travelled to Paris for treatment by the dentist Dr. Evans, whose skill allowed him to regain the ability to speak and eat normally.

In 1858, Unkovsky resumed service and was attached to the Tula Arms Plant until 1860, when he became assistant commander of the Moscow Arsenal. In 1861 the nobility of Kaluga Province elected him as justice mediator of Peremyshlsky Uyezd, and he was confirmed in this office on 4 March. He resigned in September 1862 after being promoted colonel in April of that year. From October 1862, he served in the Moscow Fortress Artillery, and on 2 December 1863 was appointed commander of the newly formed 36th Artillery Brigade in Mtsensk. His service brought further decorations: the Order of St. Anna, 2nd Class (1864), with Imperial crown (1867), and the Order of St. Vladimir, 4th Class (1870). On 28 March 1871 he was promoted major general, and in 1874 received the Order of St. Vladimir, 3rd Class. In 1875 Unkovsky was appointed Commandant of Moscow and head of the Moscow Military Hospital. During the Russo-Turkish War of 1877–1878 his work was recognized with the Order of St. Stanislaus, 1st Class (1878), and the Order of St. Anna, 1st Class (1880).

In May 1883, he was promoted lieutenant general, and in July became commandant of the Warsaw Citadel. In 1886 he was appointed Commandant of Moscow, receiving the Order of St. Vladimir, 2nd Class the same year. Later honors included the Order of the White Eagle (1889), the Order of St. Alexander Nevsky (1894), and the Bukhara Order of the Golden Star (1896). That year he was promoted General of Artillery.

== Death ==
Unkovsky died on 13 (26) February 1904 in Moscow and was buried at the cemetery of the Alexeyevsky Convent, alongside his wife, who had died in 1902.

== Family ==
Sergei Unkovsky married Yekaterina Vilgelmovna Olive, daughter of William Seton Olive (Wilhelm Nikolaevich) Olive . They had one son, Sergey (1865–1866), and three daughters: Sofiya (1866–1869), Yekaterina, and Varvara. Varvara married Major General of the Imperial Russian Army Dimitri Eduardovich (von) Tenner (1869–1921).
