= Mozhaysky's airplane =

Russian experimental airplane

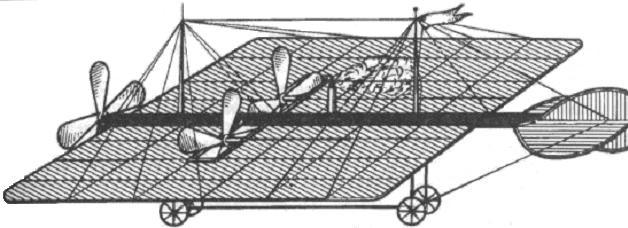

General information
- Type: Experimental monoplane
- Manufacturer: Alexander Mozhaysky
- Designer: Alexander Mozhaysky
- Status: unknown
- Number built: 1

History
- First flight: Between 1884 (disputed)

Mozhaysky's airplane (Russian: Самолёт Можайского) was an experimental Russian airplane designed and built by a naval officer Alexander Mozhaysky (also transliterated as Mozhayskiy, Mozhayski, Mozhaiski and Mozhaisky). Powered by two steam engines, the monoplane design reputedly made a powered take off assisted by the use of a ramp, flying between 20 and 30 m (66–98 ft) near Krasnoye Selo, Russia in 1884.

== Characteristics ==
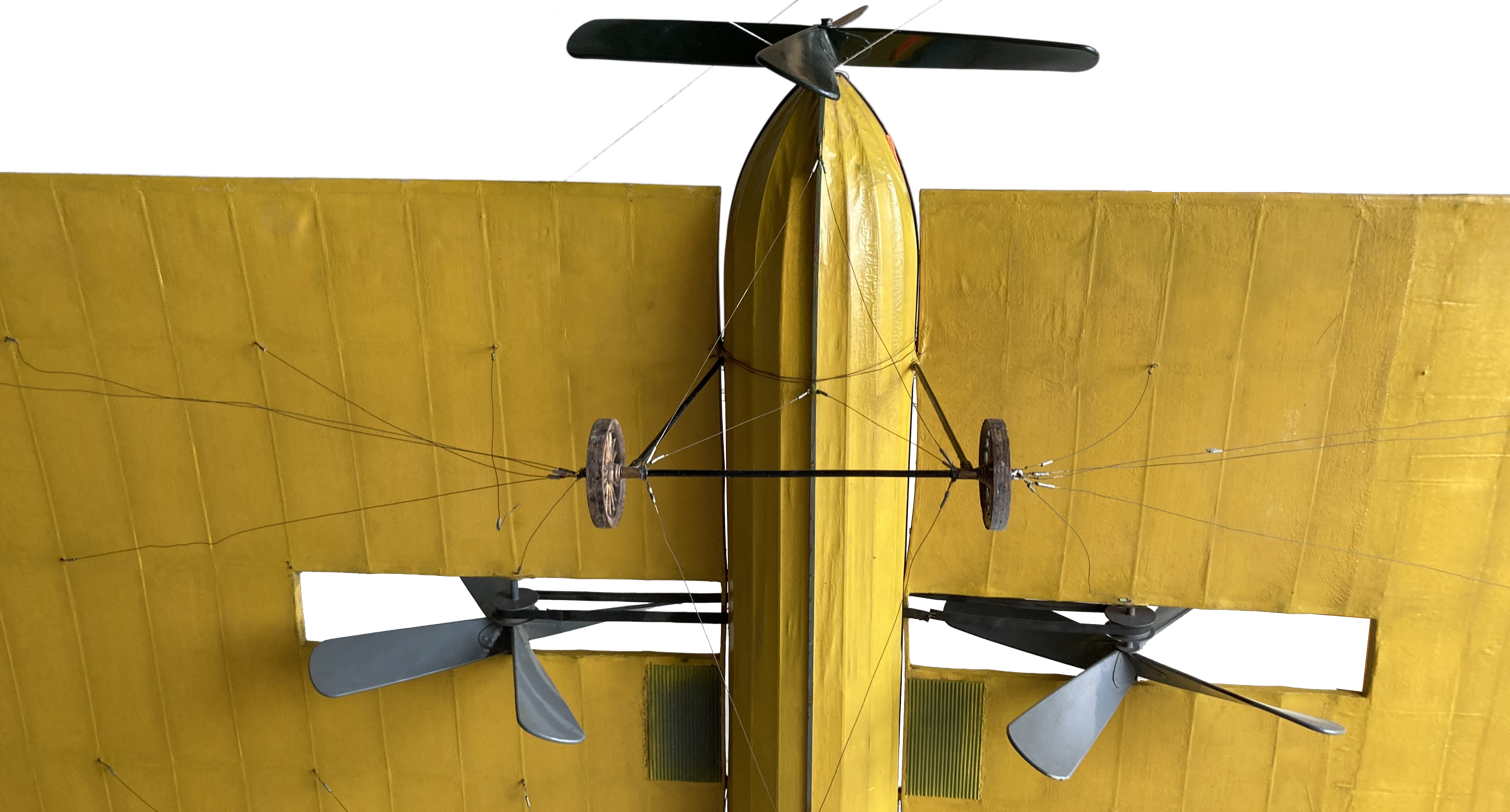
Mozhaysky's airplane (fragment of model). Collections of the Central House of Aviation and Cosmonautics.

The aircraft was originally powered by two steam engines with a total power of 30 horsepower (22 kW). It had an estimated flight speed of 40 km/h (22 kn; 25 mph), a gross weight of 950 kilograms (2,090 lb), a wingspan of 24 metres (79 ft) and a fuselage length of 15 metres (49 ft).

Tests were carried out over several years starting in 1882. A note by the chief of the Military Engineering Board of the Russian Ministry of War, describes the results of testing in 1883: "we have seen it in action ... but it could not take off".

== Project development ==
On 21 January 1883 Mozhaysky presented his project to the Russian Technological Society's Seventh Division (Aeronautics). A special presentation was made and resulted in the assignment of an evaluation commission, which included a Division II (Mechanical) representative. The aircraft, however, was not powerful enough for flight, and neither the Technological Society nor the Ministry of War could assist Mozhaysky.

In 1885 the Mozhaysky Commission appealed to the Chief of Military Engineering, but the request was not accepted. That same year, the aircraft tried to take off in the presence of authorities, piloted by its mechanic I. N. Golubiov. During the flight trial a wooden member failed, resulting in a broken wing.

== Feasibility ==
Historical research by the Soviet Central Aerohydrodynamic Institute (Russian: ЦАГИ) of Moscow in 1979 and 1981 showed that it would be impossible to keep the aircraft in level flight due to a lack of stability. However, historical data has emerged claiming that Mozhaysky's aircraft achieved flight, as found in a 1909 newspaper, and also included in the "Military Encyclopedia" of 1916.

After failing its test flight, Mozhaysky tried to repair his aircraft and equip it with new engines. The Central Aerohydrodynamic Institute proved in 1982 that with new engines it could have taken off. The new steam engines had a total of 50 horsepower (37 kW) but were not ready before Mozhaysky's death in 1890. The aircraft was later dismantled and transported to nearby Vologda.

The aircraft design drawings disappeared, although various drafts of handmade components and their descriptions have been found throughout the twentieth century. Current models of the aircraft were derived from those draft drawings.

== Claim to powered, manned flight ==
Mozhaysky's design relied upon a ramp rather than engine power to generate sufficient speed for lift. The wing design of his aircraft lacked the airfoil camber necessary to generate sufficient lift. While it is possible that Mozhaysky's wings slowed his monoplane's descent after launch from the ramp, the wings were unlikely ever to have provided sufficient lift for sustained flight unless used at angles of attack that would have been impractical, given the steam engines then available to Mozhaysky. He also experimented with different angles of attack. According to Andrei Veimarn, Mozhaysky's airplane theoretically could have taken off if he had a headwind, which may have occurred on 20 July, although that date is not clearly established. On that day the weather station at Pulkovo measured wind speeds at 10 metres per second (19 kn; 22 mph), so it may have been sufficient for flight. The aircraft has been claimed to have made its maiden flight at Krasnoye Selo in 1884.

In 1909 a Russian newspaper claimed that Mozhaysky's hop was the first powered flight. In 1971–1981 TsAGI researched the topic and disproved the claim. Mozhaysky's original aircraft was found incapable of generating lift because of low engine capacity. It was also shown that with a more powerful engine, which Mozhaysky had planned shortly before his death, the aircraft might have been able to fly.
