= Yevfimiy Putyatin =

Russian admiral (1803–1883)

Count Yevfimiy Vasilyevich Putyatin
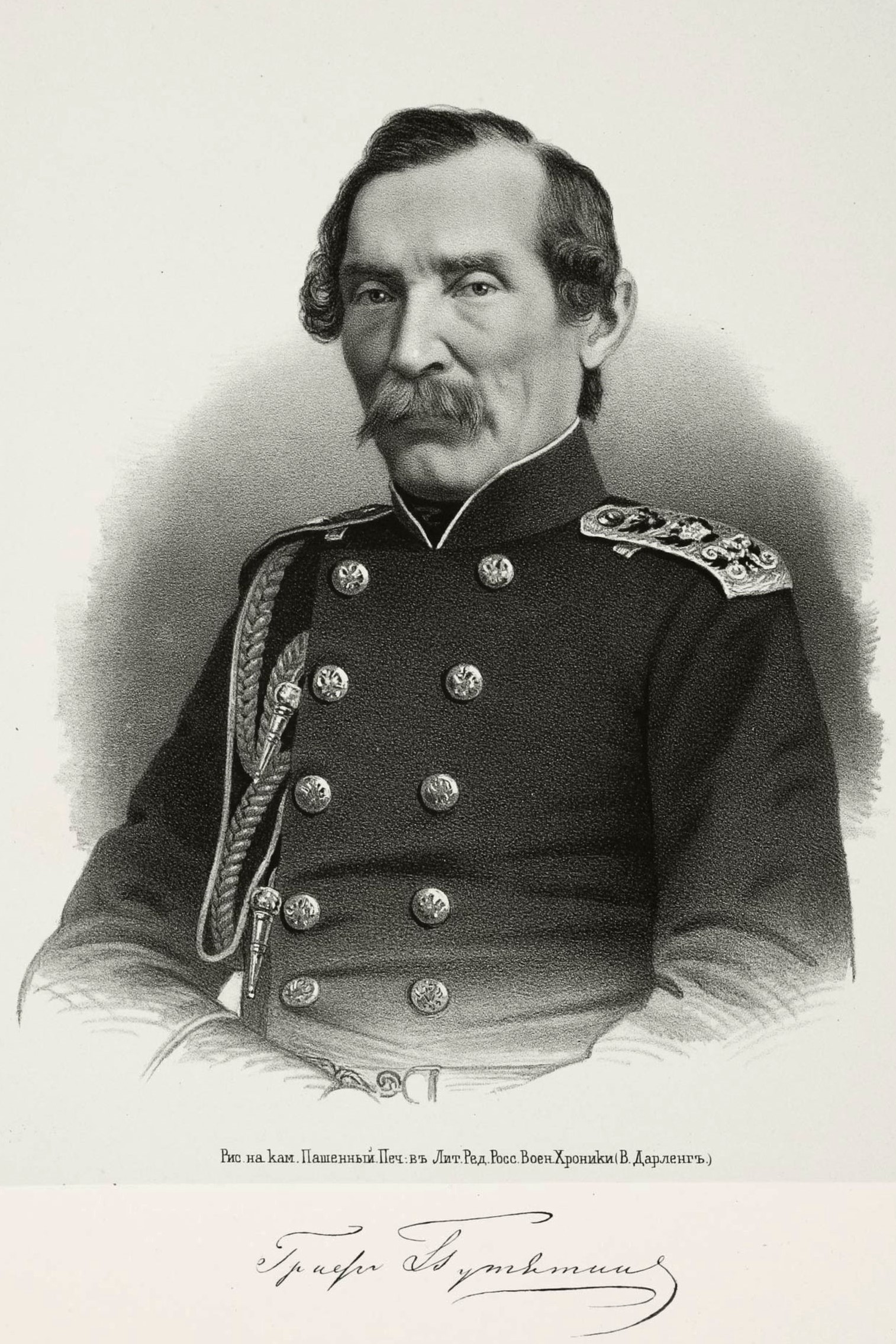
- Admiral Yevfimiy Putyatin
- Born: 8 November 1803; Novgorod, Novgorod Governorate, Russian Empire
- Died: 16 October 1883 (aged 79); Paris, France
- Military career
- Allegiance: Russian Empire
- Branch: Imperial Russian Navy
- Service years: 1822–1861
- Rank: Admiral
- Conflicts: Greek War of Independence; Battle of Navarino; Caucasian War; Crimean War
- Awards: Order of St. George; Order of St. Vladimir; Order of St. Stanislav; Order of Saint Anna

Count Yevfimiy Vasilyevich Putyatin (Russian: Евфи́мий Васи́льевич Путя́тин; 8 November 1803 – 16 October 1883), also known as Euphimius Putiatin, was an admiral in the Imperial Russian Navy. His diplomatic mission to Japan resulted in the signing of the Treaty of Shimoda in 1855, for which he was made a count. His mission to China in 1858 resulted in the Russian Treaty of Tianjin.

== Early life ==
Putyatin was descended from a noble family in Novgorod. He entered the Naval Cadet Corps, graduating in 1822, and soon afterwards was appointed to the crew of Mikhail Petrovich Lazarev which circumnavigated the globe in a three-year voyage from 1822 to 1825. He subsequently participated in the Battle of Navarino during the Greek War of Independence on 20 October 1827 and was awarded the Order of St. Vladimir, 4th degree. From 1828 to 1832, the participated in numerous missions in the Mediterranean and in the Baltic, and was awarded the Order of St George, 4th class. In 1832, Admiral Lazarev assigned him to make soundings in the Dardanelles and Bosphorus straits. During the Caucasian War (1838–1839), he participated in numerous combat operations and was wounded in combat. After promotion to captain 1st rank, in 1841, he temporarily left military service to travel to England for the purchase of ships for the Black Sea Fleet.

== Foreign service ==
In 1842, Putyatin was asked by Emperor Nicholas I to lead an armed diplomatic mission to Persia. His main purpose was to strengthen trade via the Caspian Sea, which was plagued by Turkmen piracy. Putyatin established a base at Astrakhan, and subdued the pirates in a military campaign, following which he met with Muhammad Shah of Persia, whom he persuaded to lift trade restrictions, grant fishing rights and to permit steamship communications between Persia and the Volga River.

=== Expedition to Japan ===
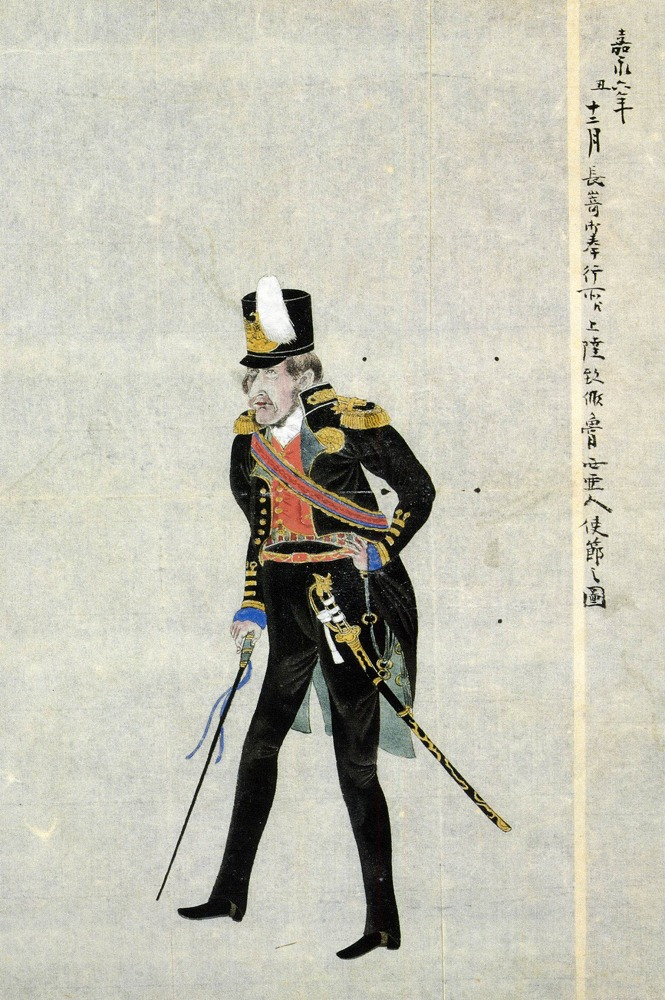
Putyatin in Nagasaki, 1853.

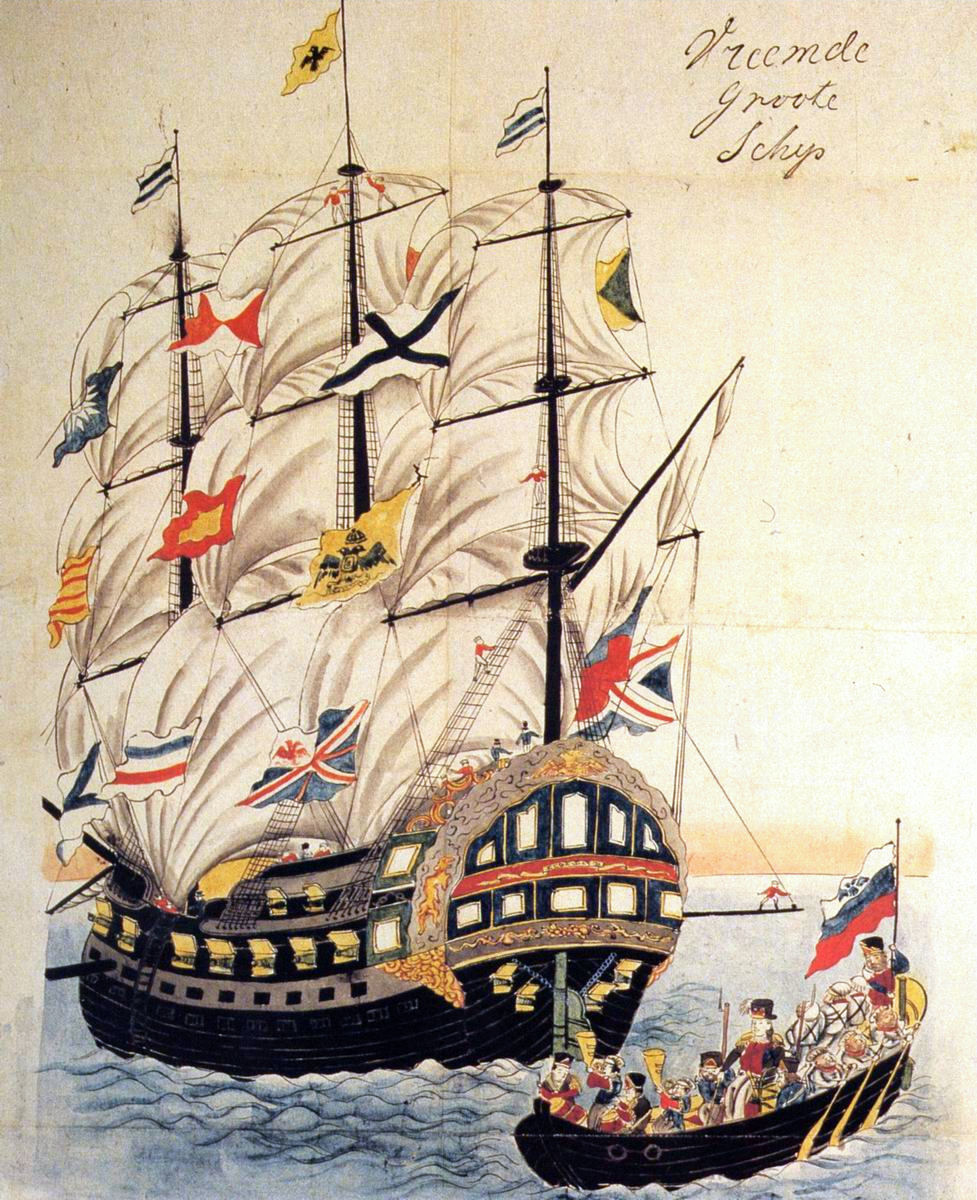
Pallada in Nagasaki, 1854 Japanese painting.

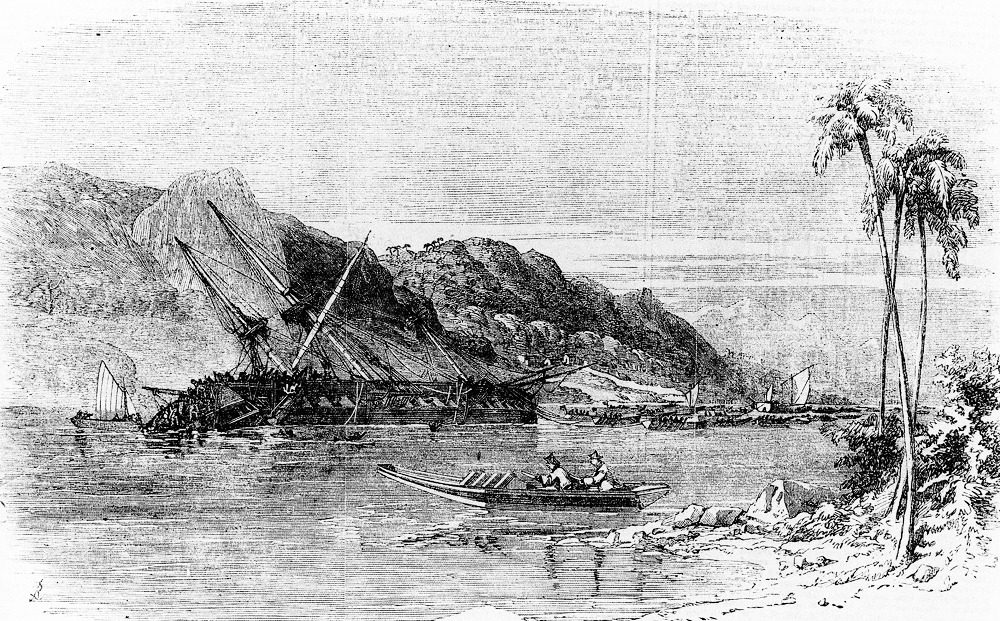
The sinking of Diana, Illustrated London News, 1856.

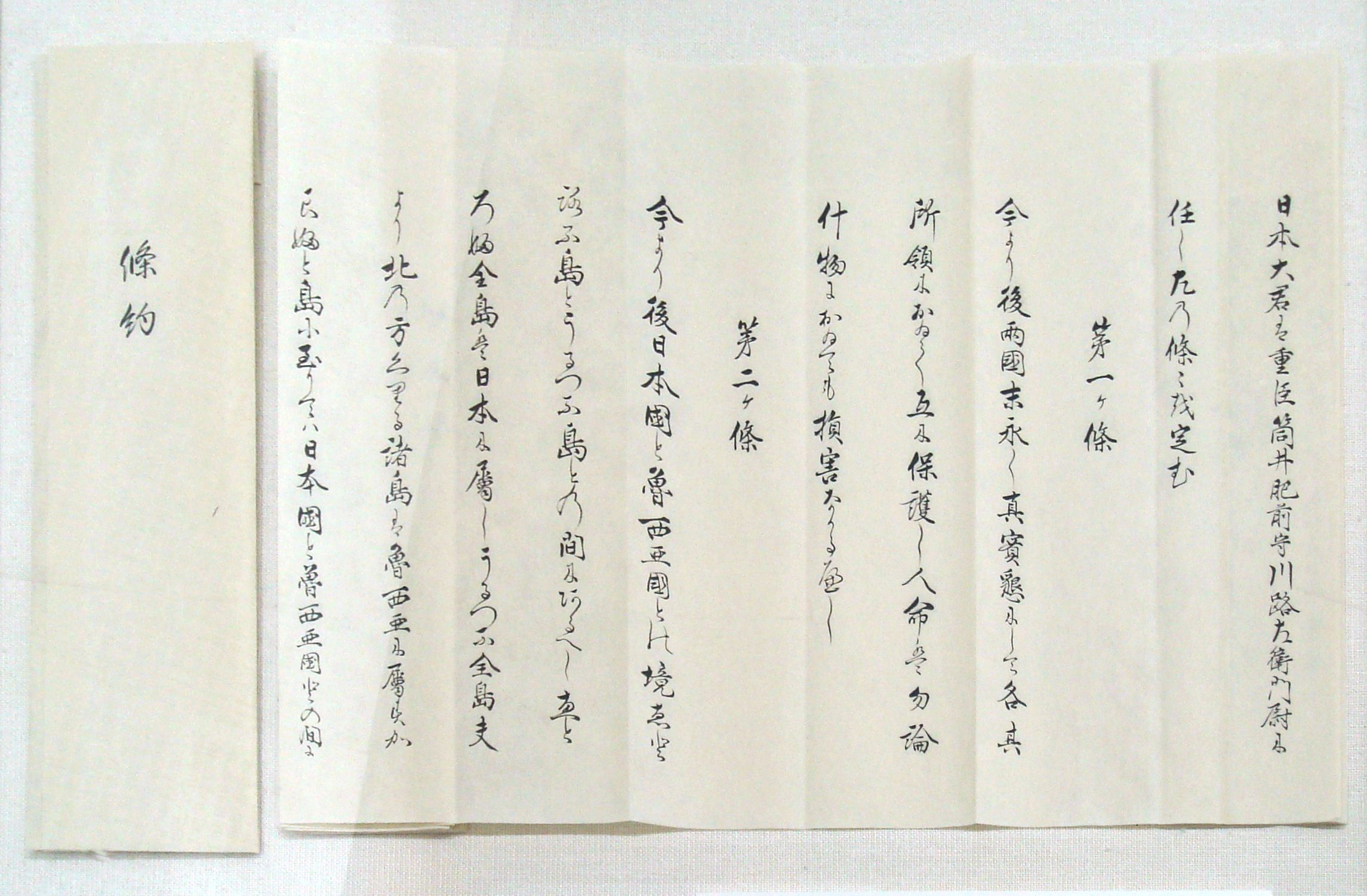
Putyatin negotiated the Shimoda Treaty between Japan and Russia

Following the successful completion of this mission, Putyatin developed a plan for an expedition to survey Russia's eastern maritime frontiers with China and Japan, with the main objective of finding suitable ports and mapping unknown coastal areas in the region, as well as the possibility of opening Japan to trade relations. The expedition was initially approved by Tsar Nicholas I in 1843, but was postponed due to concerns it would disrupt the Kyakhta trade. In 1849, Putyatin became Adjutant-General in the entourage of the Emperor, and in the same year married a daughter of a British admiral. He was promoted to vice admiral in 1851.

In 1852, on learning of American plans to send Commodore Matthew Perry in an attempt to open Japan for foreign trade, the Russian government revived Putyatin's proposal, which received support from Grand Duke Konstantin Nikolayevich of Russia. The expedition included several notable Sinologists and a number of scientists and engineers, as well as the noted author Ivan Goncharov. The frigate Pallada under the command of Ivan Unkovsky was selected as the flagship. Pallada departed Kronstadt on 7 October 1852; however it became clear during the long voyage that the vessel was unsuited for the expedition, and the newer 52-gun frigate Diana was subsequently dispatched.

Putyatin arrived at Nagasaki in Japan on 12 August 1853 – a month after the arrival of Perry at Uraga, and it was not until September 9 (after considerable discussion) that the Nagasaki bugyō agreed to accept the official letter Putyatin carried from Russian Foreign Minister Count Karl Nesselrode. During one of the shore visits, the Russian engineer Alexander Mozhaysky demonstrated a steam engine, which enabled Japanese inventor Tanaka Hisashige to reverse engineer the device to create the first Japanese steam locomotive. As negotiations were protracted by Japanese indecision and the distance from Nagasaki to the Shogun's court at Edo, Putyatin departed Nagasaki to survey the coasts of Korea and the Primorsky Krai region of the Russian Far East. The frigate Diana arrived on July 11, 1854 with word of the Crimean War, and Putyatin transferred his flag to the newer vessel.

Returning to Nagasaki, Putyatin found that no progress had been made, and that the Royal Navy had called on Nagasaki during his absence as part of a manhunt to destroy his vessel. He therefore decided to make good on his threat to sail for Edo itself. Putyatin arrived at the port of Shimoda on 22 November 1854, which had been opened to the Americans by the Convention of Kanagawa signed between the Japanese and the United States, and was permitted to start negotiations on 22 December; however on 23 December, the major Ansei Tokai earthquake shook Japan and surroundings. A 7-meter-high tsunami destroyed much of Shimoda including Putiatin's ships, with exception of Diana, which was badly damaged and sank soon afterwards at nearby Heda. The Russian delegation now found itself stranded in Japan.

Negotiations continued, resulting in the Treaty of Shimoda on 7 February 1855, which opened the ports of Hakodate, Nagasaki and Shimoda to Russian vessels, permitted limited trading and the residence of a Russian consul, and fixed the border of Japan and Russia on the Kurile Islands between Urup and Iturup.

In the meantime, the Russian sailors and technicians worked with Japanese carpenters to build a new vessel at Heda to enable the delegation to return to Russia. The schooner Heda was launched on 14 April, and Putyatin returned to a hero's welcome in St Petersburg, where he was made a Count, and appointed military governor of Kronstadt from 1856 to 1857.

In 1857, Putyatin was dispatched to China in an attempt to establish a trade agreement; however, he had only limited success after failing twice to cross the border into China by land and by sea. He returned to Japan again in the same year to sign a follow-on accord to his previous agreement. In December, he was appointed commander of the Russian Pacific squadron, and flew his flag on the paddle-wheel steam corvette America, further exploring the coast of Amur Bay. On 12 July 1858, he signed a trade agreement with China at Tianjin and allowing for the access to the interior of China by Russian missionaries. On 7 August 1858 he signed the Russo-Japanese Treaty of Friendship and Commerce in Edo, which opened more ports in Japan to Russian trade.

== Later years ==
After his return to Russia on 26 August 1858, Putyatin was promoted to admiral and was assigned as an attaché to London. He published a book on the subject of maritime training academies, and was appointed Minister of Education on 2 July 1861. While in this position, he conducted a number of reforms, including compulsory attendance at lectures.

More controversially, he decided to turn primary education over to the scope of the Russian Orthodox Church by decreeing that teachers needed to have graduated from a two-year seminary. This led to rioting in a number of cities, and Putyatin was relieved of his post on 6 January 1862. However, he was also made an honorary member of the Russian Academy of Sciences and a member of the State Council of Imperial Russia.

During his trip to London in 1845, Putyatin married Mary Knowles (1823-1879), whose father was a high-ranking naval official. They had three sons and three daughters. On the death of his wife on 18 December 1879, Putyatin left Russia for Paris. He was awarded the Order of St Andrew in May 1883, and died in Paris five months later, aged 79.

== Decorations ==
- Order of St George, 4th class (1830)
- Order of St Vladimir, 3rd class (1846)
- Order of St. Stanislav, 1st class (1850)
- , Order of Saint Anna, 1st class (1853)
- Order of the White Eagle (1855)
- Order of St. Alexander Nevsky (1858)
- Order of St Andrew (1883)

== See also ==
- Relations between the Empire of Japan and the Russian Empire
