= Empire of Japan–Russian Empire relations =

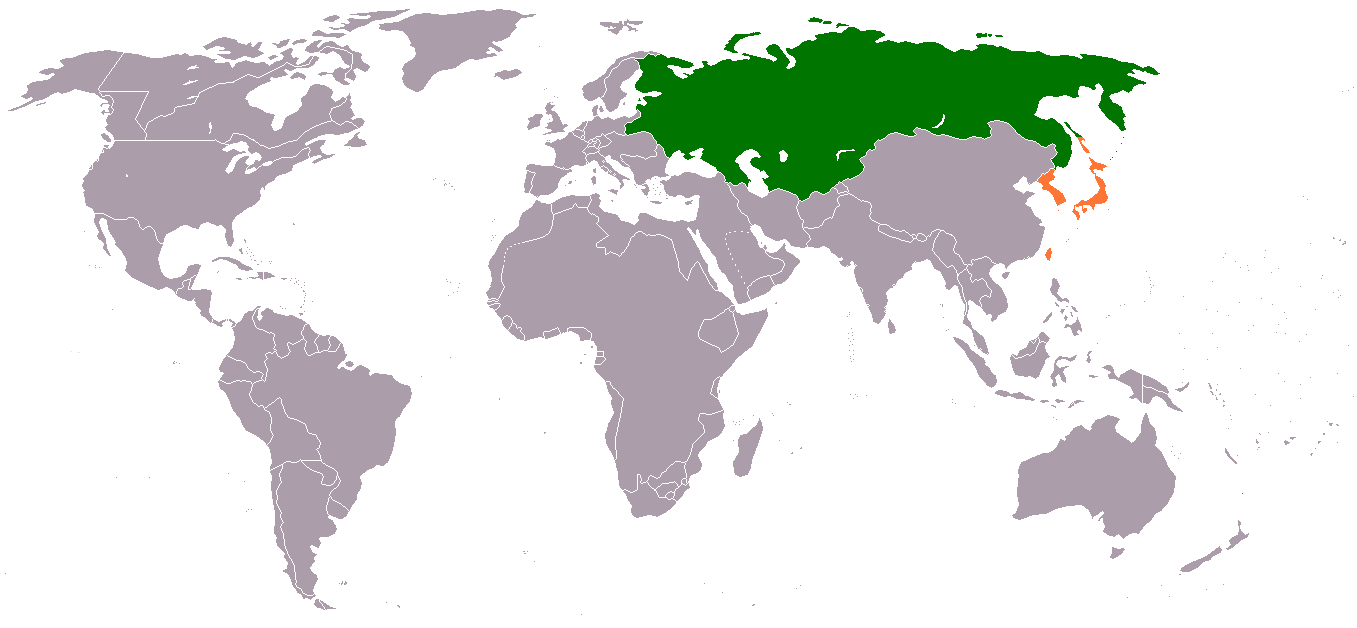
- Russia: Japan

Relations between the Empire of Japan and the Russian Empire (1855–1917) were minimal until 1855, mostly friendly from 1855 to the early 1890s, but then turned hostile, largely over the status of Manchuria and of Korea. The two empires established diplomatic and commercial relations from 1855 onwards. The Russian Empire officially ended in 1917, and was succeeded by Communist rule formalized in 1922 with the formation of the Soviet Union.

For later periods, see Japan–Soviet Union relations (1922–1991) and Japan–Russia relations (1992–present).

== Historical relations ==
=== Establishment of relations (1778–1860) ===
From the beginning of the 17th century, the Tokugawa shogunate which ruled Japan imposed a state of isolation, forbidding trade and contact with the outside world, with a narrow exception for the Netherlands, Korea, and China. Dutch merchants were restricted to an island in the port of Nagasaki. Entering Japan itself was strictly prohibited. From the early 19th century, the western colonial powers especially Britain, France, the Netherlands, and Russia, were expanding politically and economically into new markets, and were seeking to impose hegemony over much of Asia. Japan was important due to its strategic location off the China coast, with a large and untapped economic potential. As neighbors, Japan and Russia had early interactions, usually disputes over fishing grounds and territorial claims. Various documents speak of the capture of Japanese fishermen on the Kamchatka Peninsula. Some of these Japanese captives were taken to Saint Petersburg, where they were used in the teaching of Japanese language and culture.

==== 18th century contacts ====
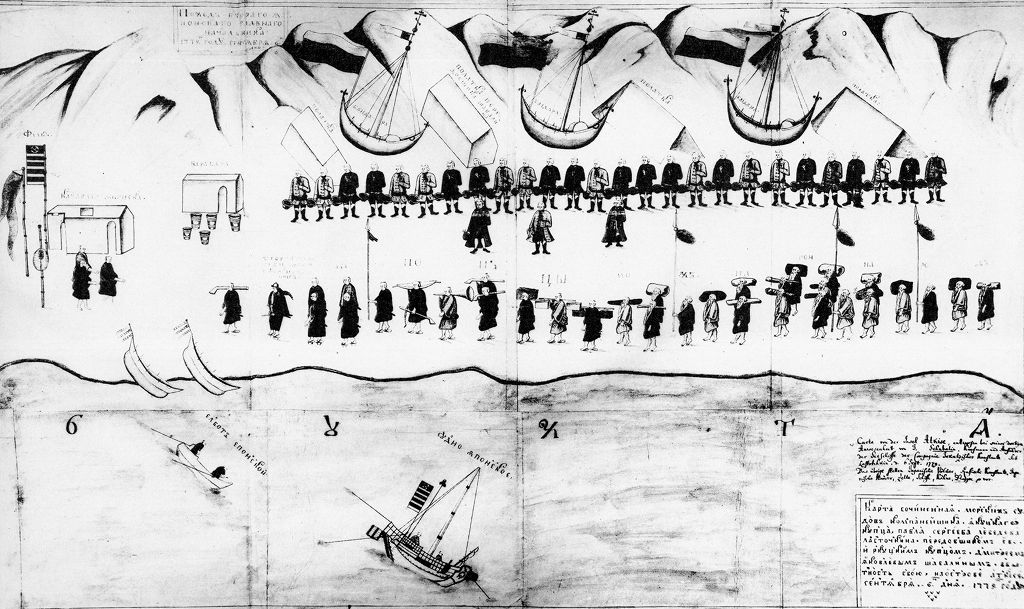
Russians meeting Japanese in 1779.

In 1778, Pavel Lebedev-Lastochkin, a merchant from Yakutsk, arrived in Hokkaidō with a small expedition. He was told to come back the following year. In 1779, he entered the harbour of Akkeshi, he offered gifts, and asked to trade, but was told that foreign trade would be only permitted in Nagasaki.

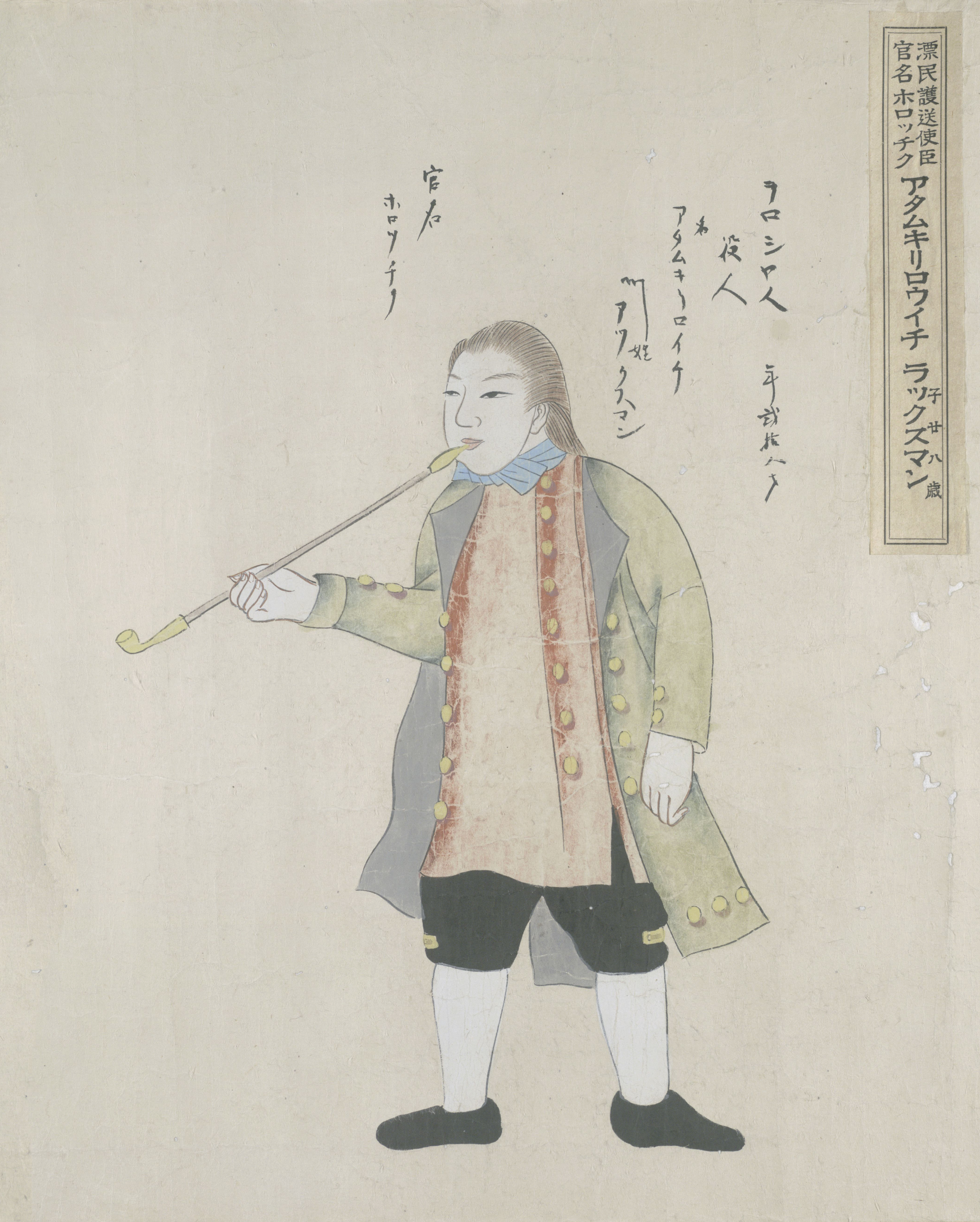
Japanese painting of Adam Laxman, 1792

A second episode took place in 1792 concerning Adam Laxman, a Russian naval officer arrived in Hokkaidō. First in the town of Matsumae and later Hakodate, returning two Japanese castaways to their home country, he attempted to establish a Russian trade agreement with Japan in order to break the exclusive trade rights of the Dutch. The Japanese suggested that Laxman leave, but Laxman had one demand: he would only leave with a trade agreement for Russia. The Japanese finally handed over a document stipulating Russia's right to send one Russian vessel of commerce to the harbor of Nagasaki. Secondly, it also restricted Russian commerce to Nagasaki. Trade elsewhere in Japan was prohibited. A final note in the document clearly stated that the practice of Christianity inside Japan was prohibited. Eventually, the Russians sent their vessel of commerce to Nagasaki, but they were not allowed to enter the harbor. The promise was of no value.

Tsar Alexander I of Russia had started a worldwide Russian representation mission under the lead of Adam Johann von Krusenstern (Russian: Крузенштерн). With Japan in mind, Nikolai Petrovich Rezanov was appointed to the mission. He was the founder of Russian–Siberian trade in fur and the ideal man to convince the Japanese.

In 1804, Rezanov got a chance to exercise his diplomatic strength in Japan. On board the ship Nadezhda, he had many gifts for the Shogunate and even brought along Japanese fishermen who had been stranded in Russia. But Rezanov could not do what so many had tried before him. An agreement was never reached. During the negotiations, the Shōgun remained silent for months; next, the Shōgun refused any negotiations and finally gave the Russian gifts back. Now Russia acted more assertively, and soon Russian navigators started to explore and map the coasts of the Kuril Islands. In 1811, the Russian colonel Vasily Golovnin was exploring Kunashir Island on behalf of the Russian Academy of Sciences. During these operations the Russians clashed with the Japanese. Golovnin was seized and taken prisoner by samurai. For the following 18 months, he remained a prisoner in Japan, where officials of the Tokugawa Shōgun questioned him about the Russian language and culture, the state of the European power struggles, and European scientific and technical developments. Golovnin's memoirs (Memoirs of Captivity in Japan During the Years 1811, 1812, and 1813) illustrate some of the methods used by Tokugawa officials.

Later on, these unsuccessful attacks would be disavowed by Russia and its interest in Japan would drop for a full generation. This would be the case until the First Opium War in 1839. The Russian Tsar Nicholas I realised the territorial expansion of Great Britain in Asia and the expansion of the United States in the Pacific Ocean and northern America. As a result, he founded a committee in 1842 to investigate Russia's power in areas around the Amur River and in Sakhalin. The committee proposed a mission to the area under the lead of Admiral Yevfimy Putyatin. The plan was not approved because officials expressed concerns it would disrupt the Kyakhta trade, and many did not believe Russia had great commercial assets to be defended in these cold and desolate places. The highly esteemed China was surprisingly (in the eyes of the Japanese) beaten by Great Britain in the Opium Wars. Although Japan was in isolation from the outside world, it was not blind to European capabilities and dangers. In light of these events, Japan began modernization of its military and coastal defenses.)

==== Yevfimy Putyatin ====
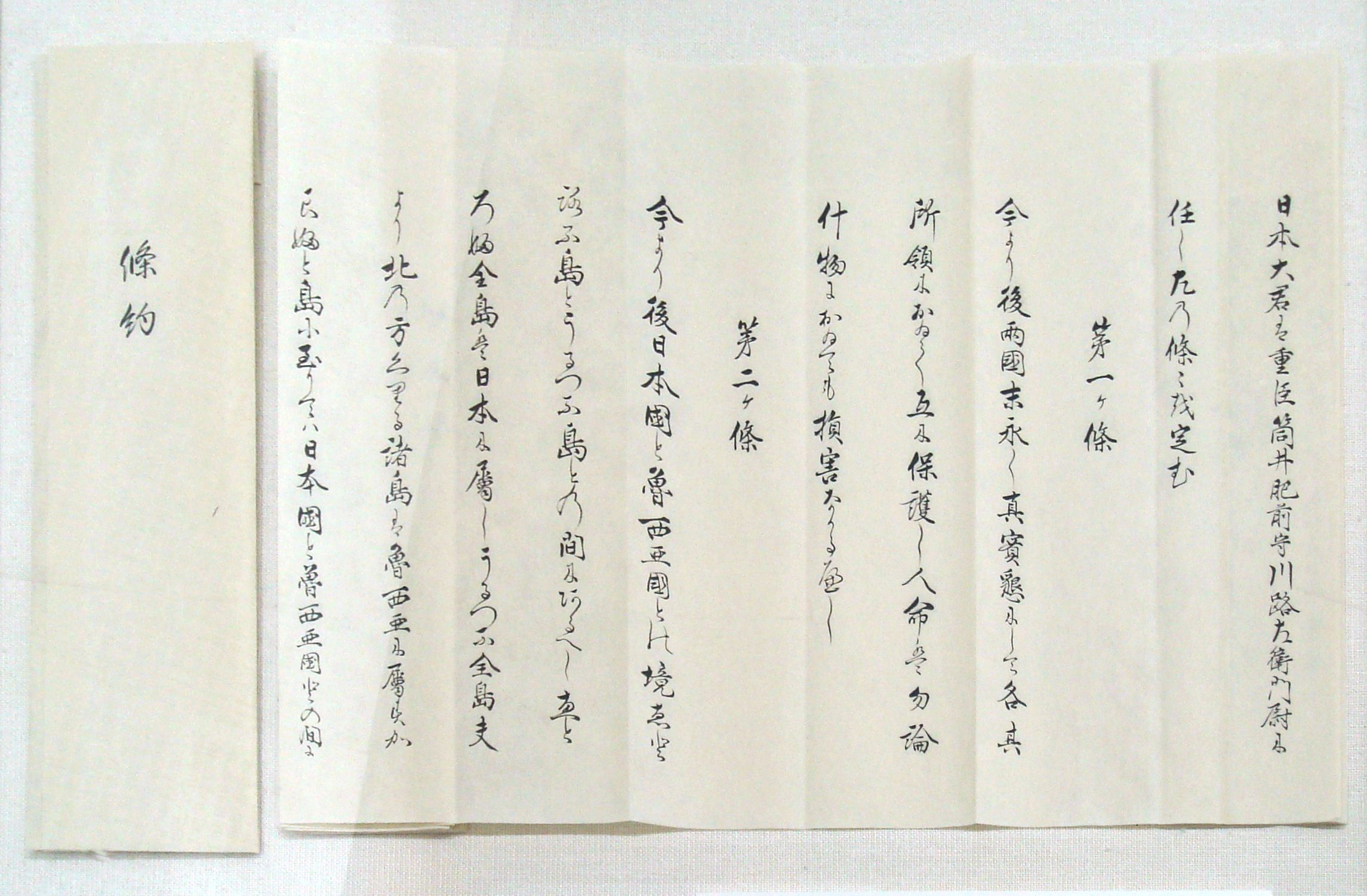
Yevfimy Putyatin negotiated the Treaty of Commerce and Navigation between Japan and Russia ("Treaty of Shimoda"), 7 February 1855.

In 1852, on learning of American plans to send Commodore Matthew Perry in an attempt to open Japan for foreign trade, the Russian government revived Putyatin's proposal, which received support from Grand Duke Konstantin Nikolayevich of Russia. The expedition included several notable Sinologists and a number of scientists and engineers, as well as the noted author Ivan Goncharov, and the Pallada under the command of Ivan Unkovsky was selected as the flagship. After many mishaps, Putyatin signed three treaties between 1855 and 1858 by which Russia established diplomatic and commercial relations with Japan. (see Treaty of Shimoda)

=== Deteriorating relations and war (1860–1914) ===
Three changes took place during the second half of the 19th century, which caused a gradual shift to hostility in the relations between the two countries. While Russia had expanded to the shores of the Pacific since 1639, their position in the region had remained weak, with perhaps 100,000 settlers and a very long supply line. This changed from 1860 onwards, as Russia by the Treaty of Peking acquired from China a long strip of Pacific coastline south of the mouth of the Amur River and began to build the naval base of Vladivostok. As Vladivostok was not a year-round ice-free port, Russia still wanted a more southern port. In 1861, Russia attempted to seize the island of Tsushima from Japan and to establish an anchorage, but failed largely due to political pressure from Great Britain and other western powers. Japan very rapidly became an emerging industrial and military power, borrowing and adapting the best technology and organizational ideas of Western Europe. Meanwhile, China became increasingly internally weak and was too weak militarily and economically to defend its vast holdings.

==== Treaty of Saint Petersburg ====
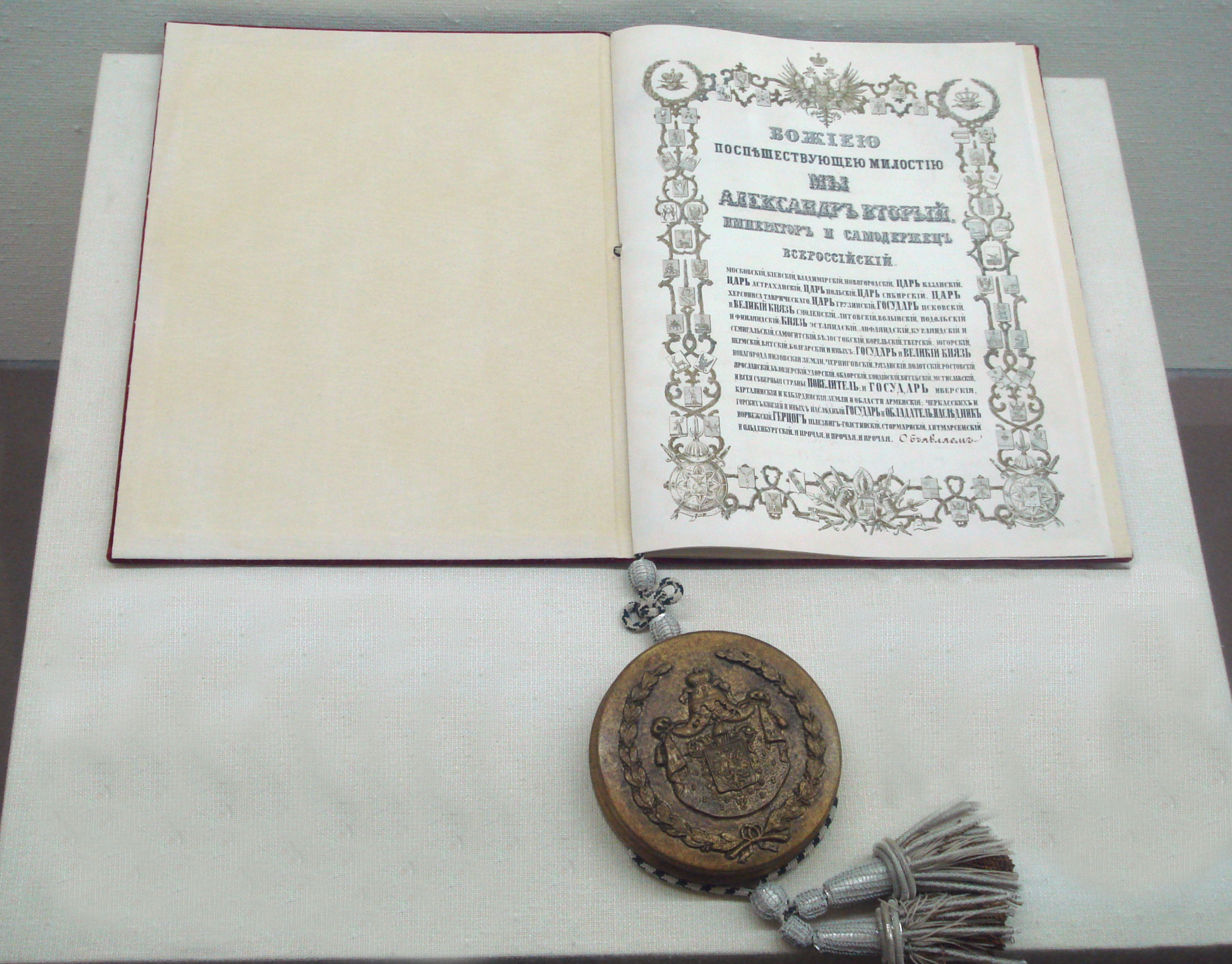
Treaty of Saint Petersburg (1875).

In 1875, the Treaty of Saint Petersburg gave Russia territorial control over all of Sakhalin and gave Japan control over all the Kuril Islands. Japan hoped to prevent Russian expansionism in Japanese territories by clearly delineating the border between the two empires.

==== Tensions escalated in 1890s ====
On May 11, 1891, when Tsarevich Nicholas, who would later become Emperor Nicholas II of Russia, was attacked while traveling in Japan. He was part of a diplomatic visit aimed at strengthening Russo-Japanese relations during a time of increasing Russian influence in the Far East. The attack took place as Nicholas was returning to Kyoto from a day trip to Lake Biwa in Ōtsu, Shiga Prefecture. The incident occurred a diplomatic crisis, as Japan feared that Russia might use it as a pretext for war. Prime Minister Matsukata Masayoshi advised Emperor Meiji to visit Nicholas in the hospital to express apologies and reassure him of Japan's commitment to diplomatic relations. The Emperor traveled overnight to Kyoto to meet with Nicholas, who, despite his injuries, expressed understanding and did not hold the incident against the Japanese people.

Sergei Witte, The Russian finance minister (1892 to 1903) controlled East Asian policy. His goal was peaceful expansion of trade with Japan and China. Japan, with its greatly expanded and modernized military easily defeated the antiquated Chinese forces in the First Sino-Japanese War (1894–95). Russia now faced the choice of collaborating with Japan (with which relations had been fairly good for some years) or acting as protector of China against Japan. Witte chose the second policy and in 1894 Russia joined Germany and France in forcing Japan to soften the peace terms it imposed on China. Japan Was forced to cede the Liaodong Peninsula and Port Arthur (both territories were located in south-eastern Manchuria, a Chinese province) back to China. China later leased it to Russia. This new Russian role angered Tokyo, which decided Russia was the main enemy in its quest to control Manchuria, Korea and China. Witte underestimated Japan's growing economic and military power while exaggerating Russia's military prowess.

Russia concluded an alliance with China (in 1896 by the Li–Lobanov Treaty), which led in 1898 to an occupation and administration (by Russian personnel and police) of the entire Liaodong Peninsula and to a fortification of the ice-free Port Arthur. Russia also established a bank and built the Chinese Eastern Railway, which was to cross northern Manchuria from west to east, linking Siberia with Vladivostok. In 1899 the Boxer Rebellion broke out with Chinese attacks on all foreigners. A large coalition of 11 Western powers and Japan sent armed forces to relieve their diplomatic missions in Peking. Russia used this as an opportunity to bring a substantial army into Manchuria. As a consequence, Manchuria became a fully incorporated outpost of the Russian Empire in 1900, and Japan made ready to fight Russia.

==== Japanese containment of Russia ====
In 1902 Japan and the British Empire forged the Anglo-Japanese Alliance, which would last until 1923. The purpose of this alliance was to contain the Russian Empire in East Asia. In response to this alliance, Russia formed a similar alliance with France and began to renege on agreements to reduce troop strength in Manchuria. From Russian perspective, it seemed inconceivable that Japan, a non-European power which was considered to be undeveloped (i.e. not-industrial), and almost bereft of natural resources, would challenge the Russian Empire. This view would change when Japan started and won the Russo-Japanese War (1904–05).]

==== War with Russia 1904-1905 ====
In 1895, Japan felt robbed of the spoils of her decisive victory over China by the Western Powers (including Russia), which revised the Treaty of Shimonoseki. The Boxer Rebellion of 1899–1901 saw Japan and Russia as allies who fought together against the Chinese, with Russians playing the leading role on the battlefield.

In the 1890s, Japan was angered at Russian encroachment on its plans to create a sphere of influence in Korea and Manchuria. Japan offered to recognize Russian dominance in Manchuria in exchange for recognition of Korea as being within the Japanese sphere of influence. Russia refused and demanded Korea north of the 39th parallel to be a neutral buffer zone between Russia and Japan. The Japanese government decided on war to stop the perceived Russian threat to its plans for expansion into Asia.

After negotiations broke down in 1904, the Japanese Navy opened hostilities by attacking the Russian Eastern Fleet at Port Arthur, China, in a surprise attack. Russia suffered multiple defeats by Japan. Tsar Nicholas II kept on with the expectation that Russia would win decisive naval battles, and when that proved illusory he fought to preserve the dignity of Russia by averting a "humiliating peace". The complete victory of the Japanese military surprised world observers. The consequences transformed the balance of power in East Asia, resulting in a reassessment of Japan's recent entry onto the world stage. It was the first major military victory in the modern era of an Asian power over a European one.

In 1905, U.S. President Theodore Roosevelt mediated peace. In the Treaty of Portsmouth both sides agreed to evacuate Manchuria and return its sovereignty to China. However Japan leased the Liaodong Peninsula (containing Port Arthur and Talien) and the Russian-built South Manchurian Railway in southern Manchuria with access to strategic resources. Japan also received the southern half of the Island of Sakhalin from Russia. Japan dropped its demand for an indemnity. Roosevelt won the Nobel Peace Prize for his successful efforts. Historian George E. Mowry concludes that Roosevelt handled the arbitration well, doing an "excellent job of balancing Russian and Japanese power in the Orient, where the supremacy of either constituted a threat to growing America." The alliance with Britain had served Japan greatly by discouraging France, Russia's European ally, from intervening in the war with Russia as this would mean war with Great Britain. (If France had intervened, it would have been the second hostile Power, and, as such, would have triggered Article 3 of the Treaty.)

Relations were good 1905–1917, as the two countries divided up Manchuria and Outer Mongolia.

=== World War I (1914–1917) ===
The alliance with Britain prompted Japan to enter World War I on the British (and thus Russian) side. Since Japan and Russia had become allies by convenience, Japan sold back to Russia a number of former Russian ships, which Japan had captured during the Russo-Japanese War. Due to the lack of supplies in the Eastern Front, Russia also ordered rifles, carbines, ammunitions, mountain guns and howitzers from Japan during the war in 1916.
For 1917–1991, see Japan–Soviet Union relations.

== See also ==
=== Russia ===
- Russian history, 1855–1892
- Russian history, 1892–1917
- Sino-Russian relations
- Russia–United States relations

=== Japan ===
- Sakoku
- Japan–United Kingdom relations
- People's Republic of China–Japan relations
- Japan–United States relations
