= Russian schooner Heda =

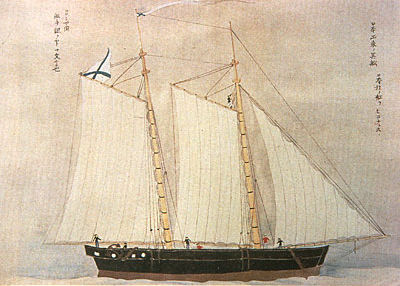
- The schooner Heda

History

Russian Empire
- Name: Heda
- Launched: 1855

General characteristics
- Class & type: Schooner
- Displacement: 100 tons
- Length: 24 meters

Heda (ヘダ号) was a schooner built by the Russian sailors of Yevfimy Putyatin and 300 Japanese carpenters of the city of Heda in 1855. According to Ivan Goncharov's book Frigate "Pallada", the schooner was built only by Russian sailors, but with the assistance of Japanese equipment and materials (see p. 584).

== Heda ==
The need for the ship arose when Putyatin's fleet was damaged in a tsunami, following the powerful Ansei-Tōkai earthquake of 23 December 1854. The flagship Diana sank on its way from Shimoda to Heda as it was sailing there for repairs. Following the signature of the Treaty of Shimoda with the Russians, the Japanese government decided to help the Russians return to their country by building a western-style ship.

Three hundred Japanese carpenters worked with the Russian sailors to build a Western-style ship in two months, with the help of plans salvaged from the Diana. It was a two-masted schooner, weighing 100 tons, with a length of 24 meters. The ship was named in honour of the Japanese city that helped with its construction.

== Kimizawagata ==
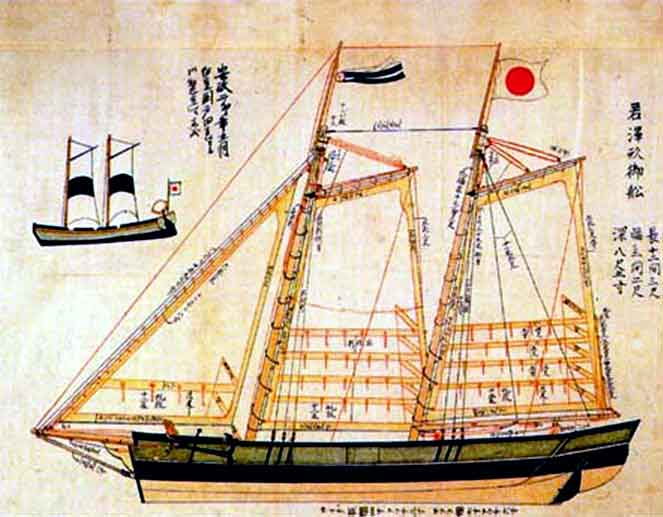
One of the Kimizawagata ships, derived from the design of Heda.

Soon, the Japanese government ordered six more ships to be built on the model of the Heda, thereby contributing to the development of western-style shipbuilding in Japan. The new ship type was named Kimisawagata (君沢形). Other, were built on the same model: four ships of 500 tons of the Toyoshimagata type (豊島形), and six ships of 30 tons of the Nirayamagata type (韮山型). These efforts contributed to the development of Japan's first home-built Imperial Navy steam warship, the Chiyodagata (千代田形｣).

== Other Bakufu arsenals ==
Shipbuilding would also occur in other locations during the Bakumatsu period. For example, Uraga built the Hōō Maru (鳳凰丸), the Mito Domain built the Asahi-maru (旭日丸), the Satsuma Domain built the Shohei-Maru (昇平丸) and the Houzui-Maru (鳳瑞丸), as well as Saga Domain.

== See also ==
- Imperial Japanese Navy
- Empire of Japan – Russian Empire relations
