= Unkovsky =

Unkovsky Унковские
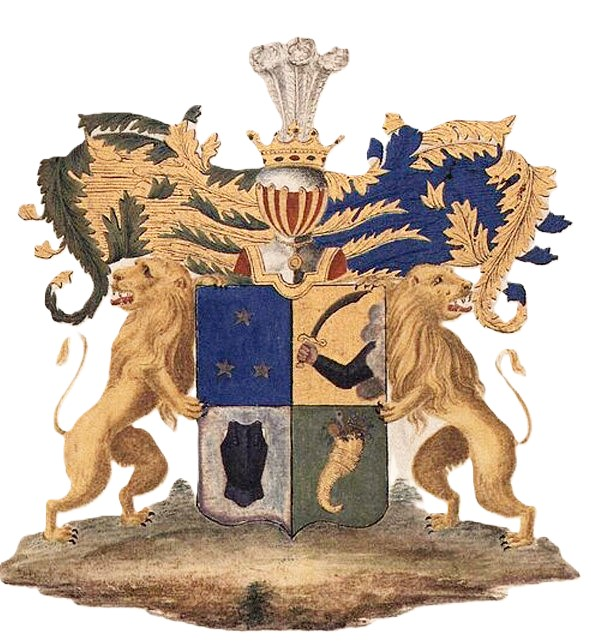
- Country: Grand Duchy of Moscow; Tsardom of Russia; Russian Empire
- Place of origin: Novgorod

Unkovsky (also spelled Ounkovski, Russian: Унковские) is an ancient Russian noble family, most likely of Novgorodian origin. The lineage can be traced back to the 15th century. In the 1495 cadastral book of the Shelonskaya Pyatina, compiled by Matvei Valuev, the village of Unkovichi in the Frolovsky parish is recorded. Other documents from the same period mention the first known family members — Alexei and Ivan, landowners in the same district.

According to Bobrinsky's armorial, the ancestors of the Unkovsky family held estates from 1652. However, the “Siege List” of 1618, a manuscript relating to the defense of Moscow, records that Vasily Yakovlevich Unkovsky had already been granted estates in Vologodsky Uyezd as well as in two volosts of Yaroslavsky Uyezd, as a reward for his “Yaroslavl service.”

== Coat of arms ==
The shield is quartered. In the first quarter, in a blue field, three golden hexagonal stars (a modification of the Polish Karp coat of arms). In the second, in a golden field, an armored arm emerging from a cloud holds a sword raised upwards (Polish coat of arms Mała Pogoń). In the third, in a silver field, a cuirass. In the fourth, in a green field, a golden cornucopia with flowers. The shield is surmounted by a noble helmet and a coronet with three ostrich feathers. The mantling is green and gold, lined with gold and blue. The supporters are two lions.

== Notable family members ==
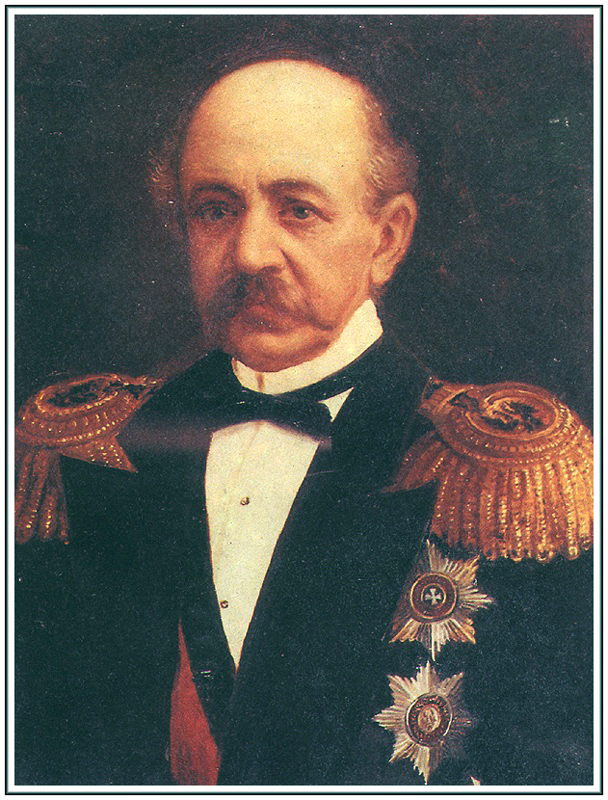
Ivan Semionovich Unkovsky (1822–1886) — admiral of the Imperial Russian Navy.

Many members of the Unkovsky family served the Russian state in military, administrative and cultural roles from the 16th to the 20th centuries.

- Bogdan Osipovich Unkovsky — voivode in Maly Yaroslavets (1626–1628), Tarusa (1630).
- Stepan Bogdanovich Unkovsky — voivode in Bolkhov (1626), Gorokhovets (1627–1628).
- Matvei Mikhailovich Unkovsky, Bogdan Baushev Unkovsky — Moscow nobles (1627–1629).
- Ivan Voinovich Unkovsky — court official (1627–1629).
- Andrei Stepanovich Unkovsky — city nobleman of Pochep (1629).
- Fyodor Sharapovich Unkovsky — city nobleman of Maly Yaroslavets (1629).
- Fyodor Fyodorovich Unkovsky, Grigory Yakovlevich Unkovsky — stolniks of Patriarch Filaret (1629), Moscow nobles (1636–1658).
- Gavrila Unkovsky — voivode in Maly Yaroslavets (before 1636).
- Stepan Ivanovich Unkovsky — voivode in Staritsa (1636–1637).
- Gavrila Ulyanovich Unkovsky — court noble, voivode in Vorotynsk (1636).
- Mikhail Vasilyevich Unkovsky — court noble (1640).
- Mikhail Ivanovich Unkovsky — voivode in Staritsa (1654).
- Vasily Yakovlevich Unkovsky — Moscow nobleman, voivode in Yaroslavl (1664–1668).
- Ivan Unkovsky — voivode in Kozelsk (1664–1665).
- Stepan Unkovsky — voivode in Borovsk (1664–1665).
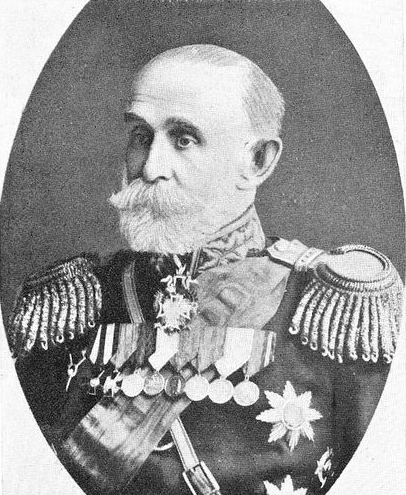
  Sergei Unkovsky (1829–1904) — general of artillery, commandant of Moscow.
- Andrei Dementievich Unkovsky — Moscow nobleman, voivode in Tsaritsyn (1666–1669).
- Ivan Unkovsky — voivode in Opochka (1678).
- Dmitry Ivanovich Unkovsky — stolnik, voivode in Opochka (1684).
- Fyodor Mikhailovich Unkovsky, Prokofiy Mikhailovich Unkovsky, Ivan Mikhailovich Unkovsky, Maxim Ivanovich Unkovsky, Ivan Fyodorovich Unkovsky, Ivan Lukyanovich Unkovsky — Moscow nobles (1629–1692).
- Ivan Mikhailovich Unkovsky, Grigory Dementievich Unkovsky — stolniks (1690–1692).
- Semion Yakovlevich Unkovsky (1788–1882) — officer of the Imperial Russian Navy, circumnavigator, memoirist, later director of schools and marshal of the nobility in Kaluga province.
- Fyodor Semionovich Unkovsky (1821–1863) — Court Councilor, awarded the Order of St. Vladimir, 3rd class.
- Alexander Semionovich Unkovsky (1825–1900) — lieutenant general.
- Ivan Semionovich Unkovsky (1822–1886) — admiral of the Imperial Russian Navy.
- Sergei Semionovich Unkovsky (1829–1904) — general of artillery, commandant of Moscow.
