= Russian frigate Diana =

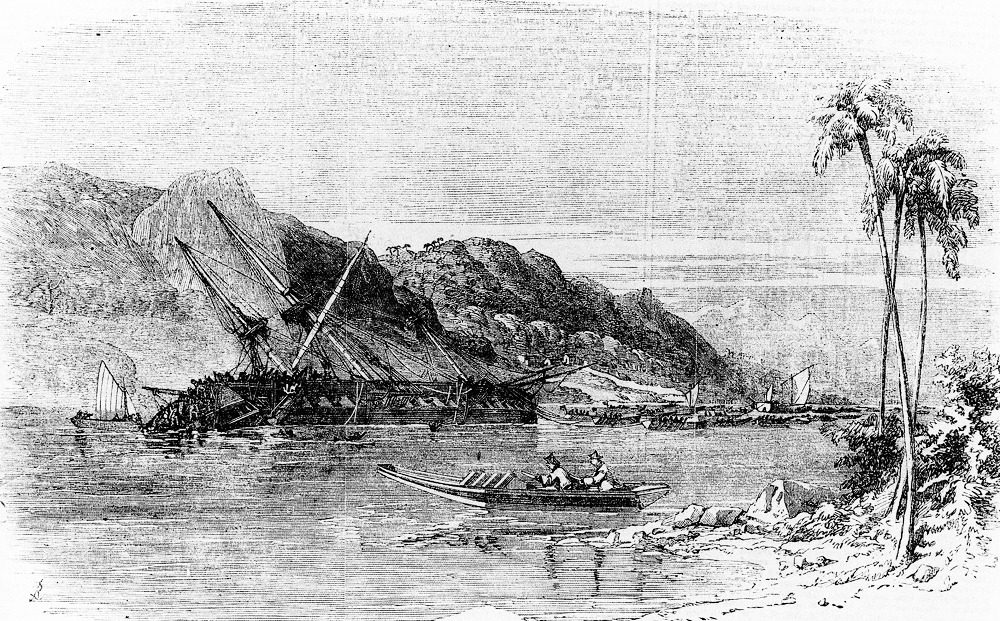
- The wreckage of Diana, Illustrated London News, 1856.

History

Russian Empire
- Name: Diana
- Launched: 1853
- Fate: Sank in December 1854

General characteristics
- Class & type: Frigate
- Propulsion: sail

Diana was a frigate of the Imperial Russian Navy. She was built in 1853 and was the flagship of the Russian explorer Yevfimy Putyatin when he visited Japan in 1854 to negotiate what would become the Treaty of Shimoda.

Putyatin's fleet was damaged in a tsunami, following the powerful Ansei-Tōkai earthquake of 23 December 1854. Diana was spun round 42 times on its moorings and was so badly damaged that it sank in a later storm in the bay of Miyajima-mura (宮島村) (Now an area of Fuji), while sailing from Shimoda to Heda for repairs.

Three hundred Japanese carpenters worked with the Russian sailors to build a Western-style ship in two months, with the help of plans salvaged from Diana. They eventually built a two-masted schooner, named Heda, displacing 100 tons, with a length of 24 metres (79 ft). The ship was named in honour of Heda for their assistance in its construction. The Japanese government would later order the construction of six vessels similar to the Heda to help develop a maritime fleet comparable to those of western powers.

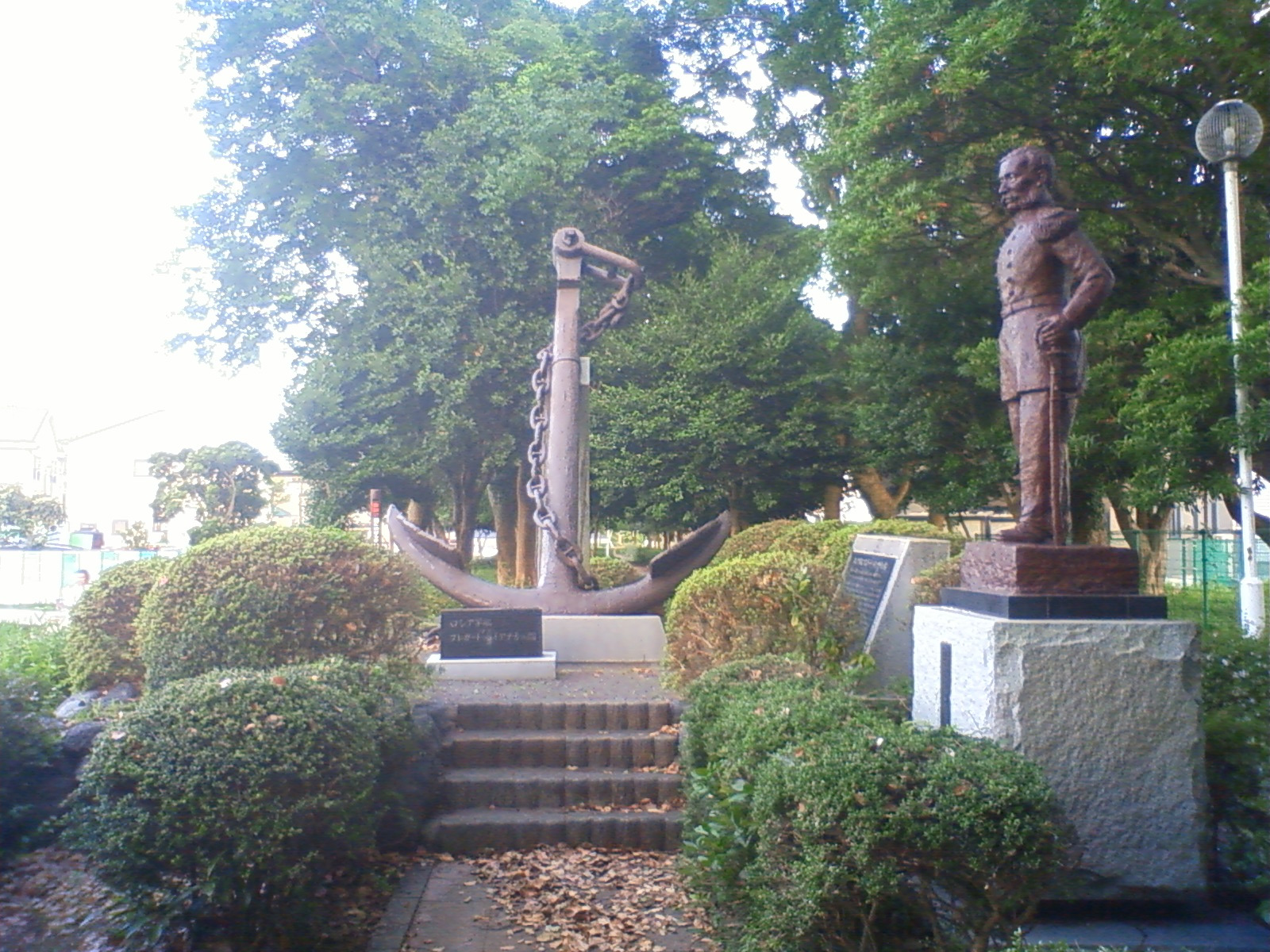
Anchor of the Diana and Admiral Putyatin statue
