= Peremyshlsky Uyezd =

Peremyshlsky Uyezd (Перемы́шльский уе́зд) was one of the subdivisions of the Kaluga Governorate of the Russian Empire. It was situated in the eastern part of the governorate. Its administrative centre was Peremyshl.

== Demographics ==
At the time of the Russian Empire Census of 1897, Peremyshlsky Uyezd had a population of 61,039. Of these, 99.9% spoke Russian as their native language.
