= Heda, Shizuoka =

Heda 戸田村
- Former municipality
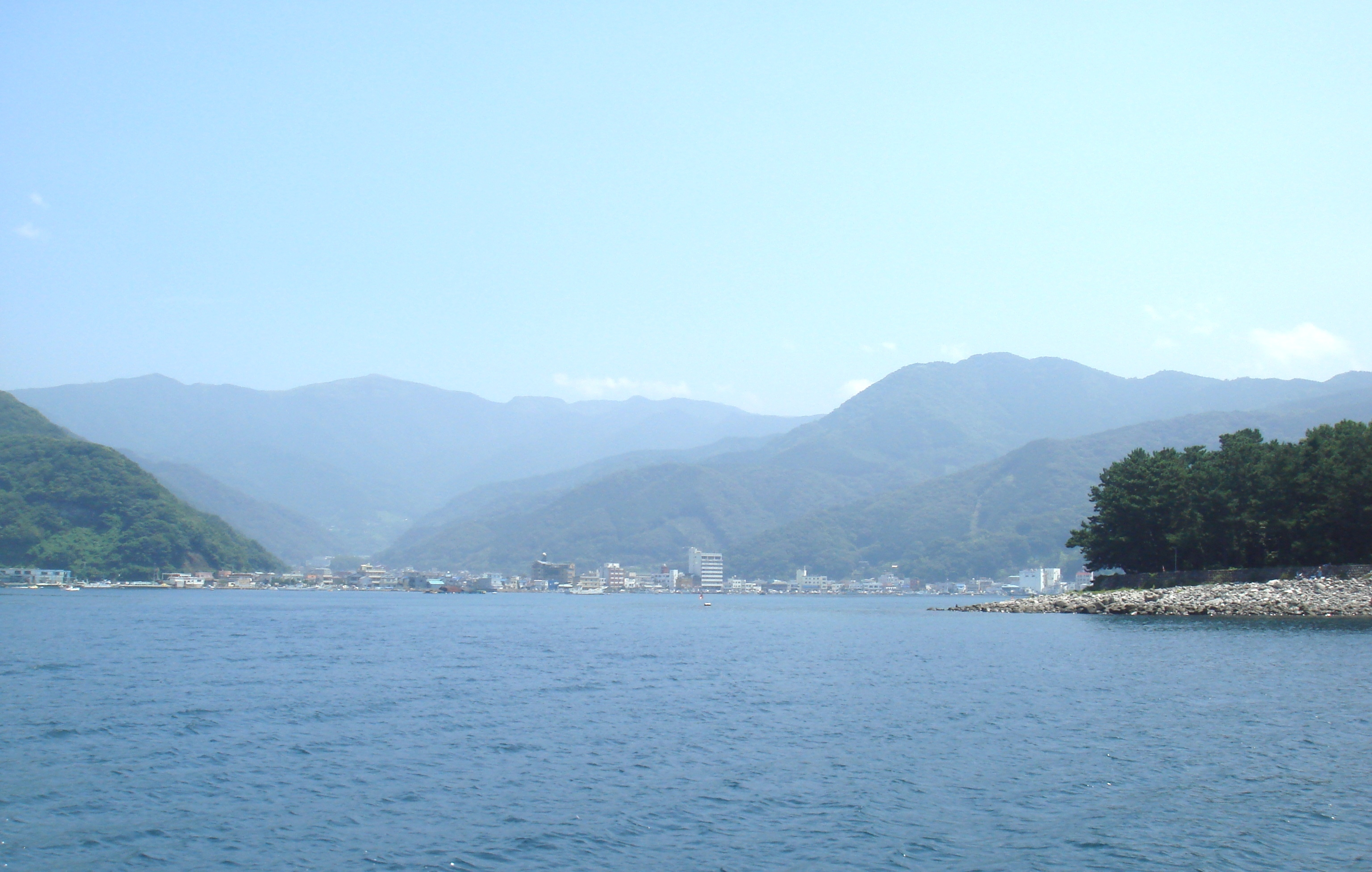
- Entrance to Heda Bay

- Flag Emblem

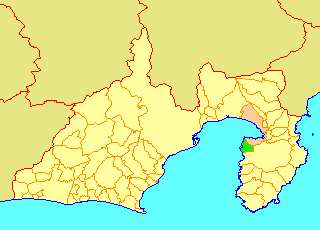
- Location of Heda in Shizuoka Prefecture

- Location in Japan
- Coordinates: 34.9719°N 138.7794°E
- Country: Japan
- Region: Chūbu (Tōkai)
- Prefecture: Shizuoka Prefecture
- District: Tagata
- Merged: April 1, 2005 (now part of Numazu)

Area
  - Total: 34.92 km^{2} (13.48 sq mi)

Population (March 1, 2005)
  - Total: 3,681
  - Density: 105.4/km^{2} (273/sq mi)
- Time zone: UTC+09:00 (JST)
- Symbols
- Bird: Common gull
- Flower: Crinum asiaticum
- Tree: Buxus microphylla

Heda (戸田村, Heda-mura) was a village located in Tagata District, Shizuoka, Japan on the Suruga Bay coast of Izu Peninsula. Views of Mount Fuji can be seen from the village, which is a tourist resort, known for regional seafood specialties.

As of March 1, 2005, the village had an estimated population of 3,681 and a density of 105.4 persons per km^{2}. The total area was 34.92 km^{2}.

== History ==
On December 23, 1854, Diana, the flagship of the Russian fleet bearing Admiral Yevfimy Putyatin and his delegation for the negotiation of the Treaty of Shimoda was struck by a tsunami from the Ansei Tōkai earthquake and sank. The survivors stayed in Heda, where they cooperated with Japanese carpenters and shipbuilders to construct a new vessel (christened Heda) to take them back to Russia. This marked the first cooperative venture between Japanese and Europeans since the start of the national seclusion policy at the start of the Edo period.

In the April 1, 1889, cadastral reform of Meiji period Japan, Heda was organized as Heda Village. On April 1, 2005, Heda was merged into the expanded city of Numazu.

== Local specialties ==
Heda is known for the Japanese spider crab called takaashi-gani in Japanese which can grow up to 4 metres in length. Smaller versions of takaashi-gani (about 1 metre) are available in several restaurants and hotels around the village. Heda is also known for its green tea production and consumption.

== Gallery ==
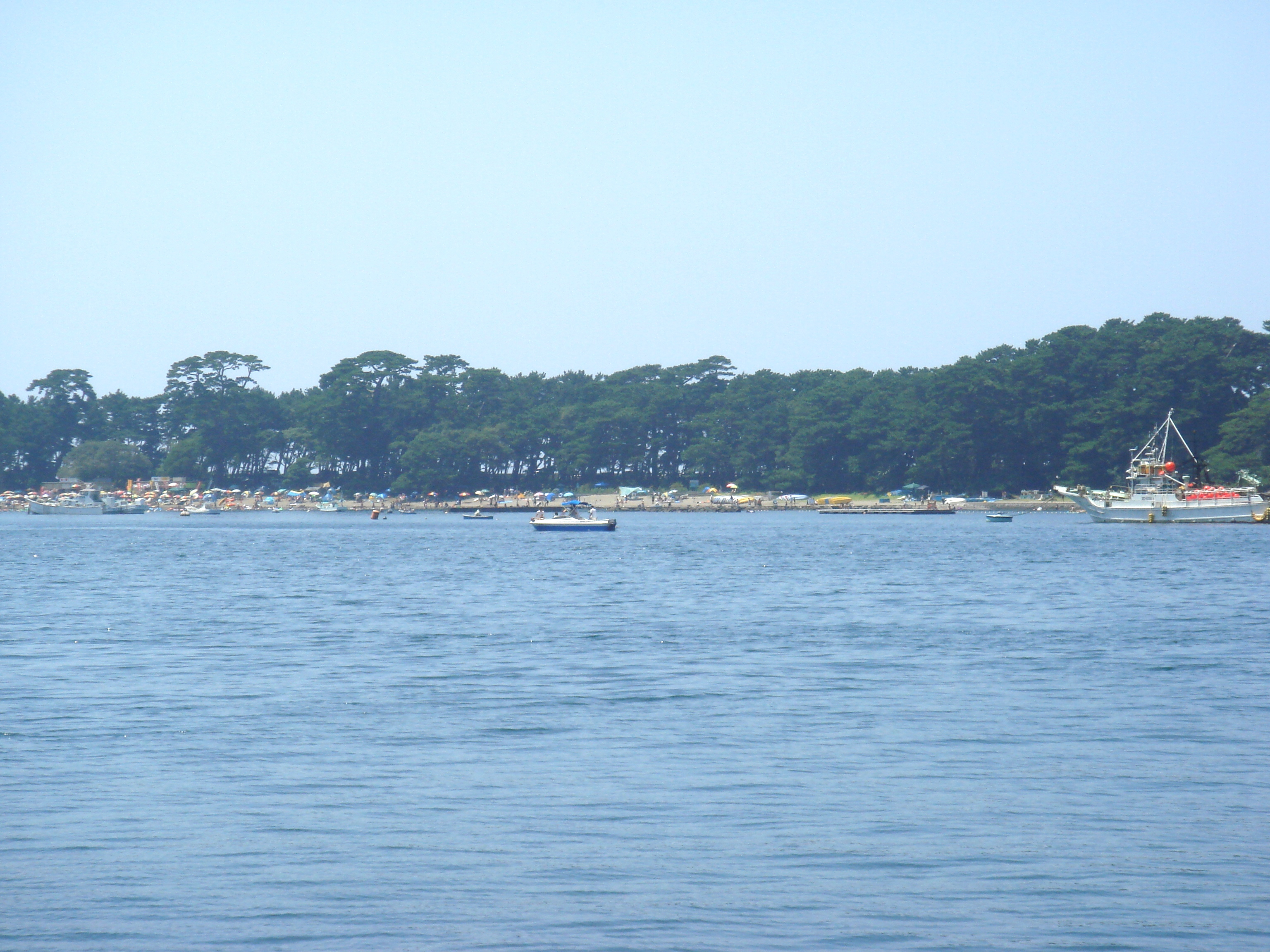
Beach inside Heda Bay.

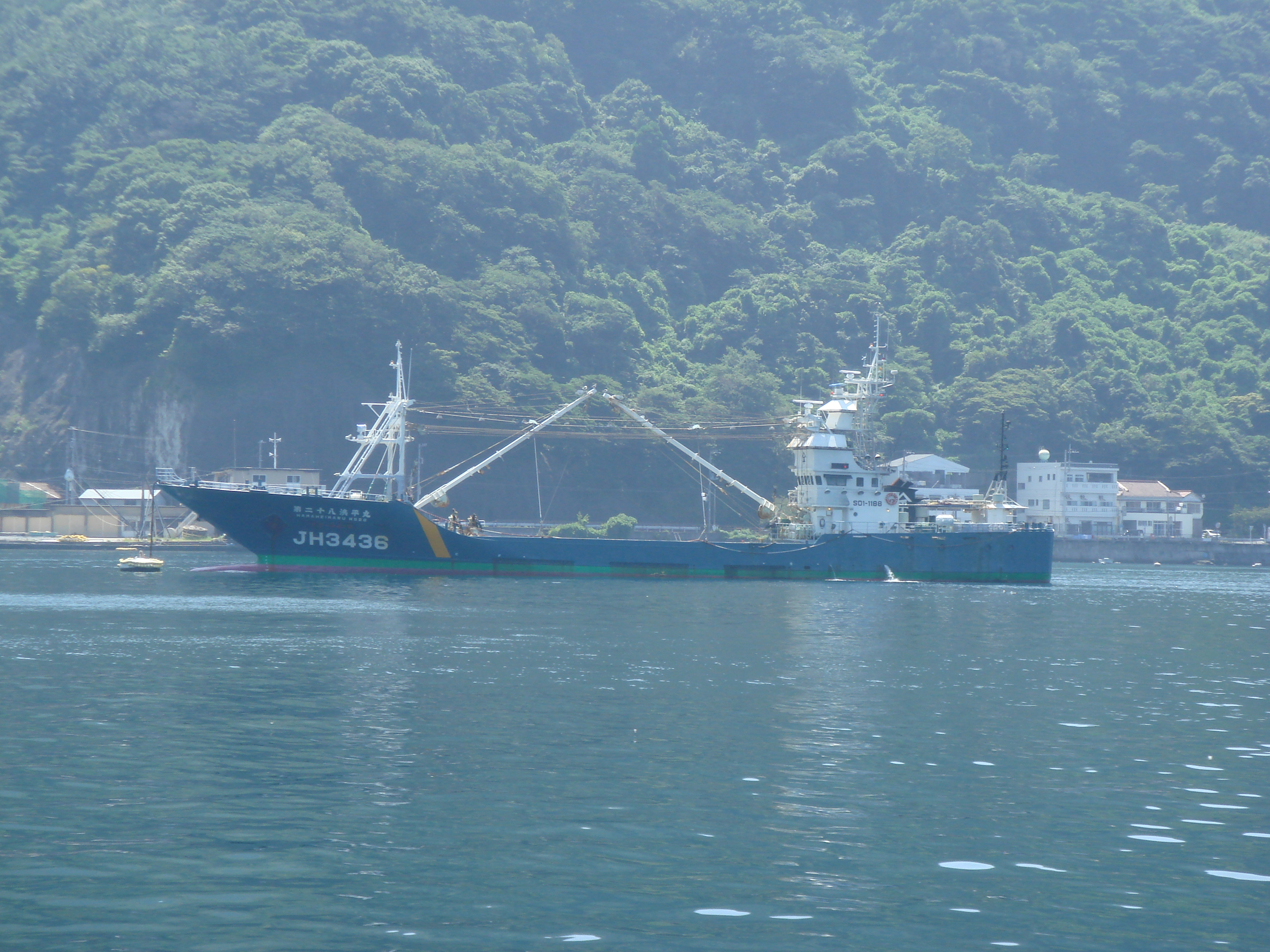
Katsuo fishing ship (カツオ船) in Heda Bay.

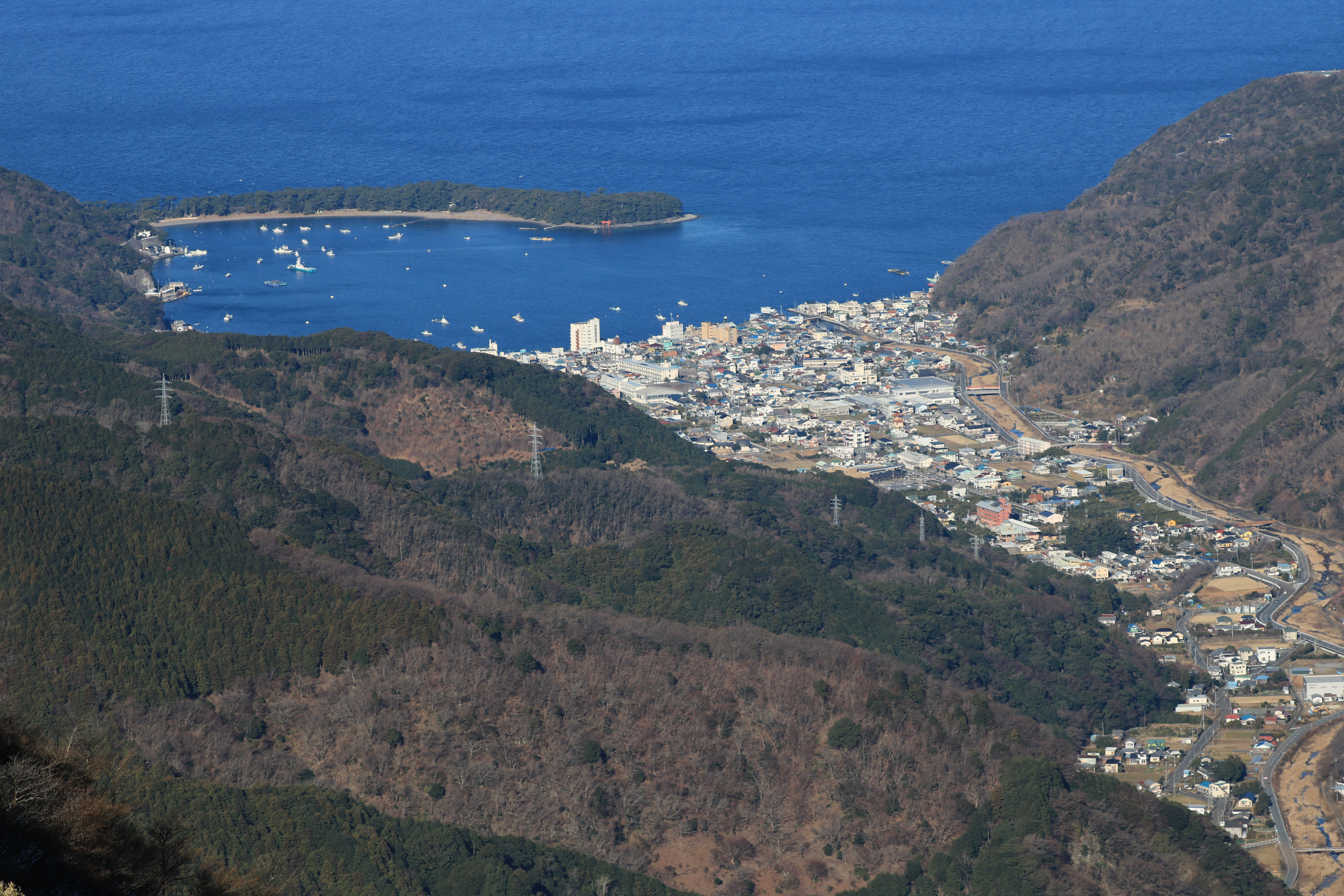
Area of Heda in Numazu city.
