= Russkaya Rech (Moscow magazine) =

Former Russian literary and political magazine

- Editor: Evgenya Tur
- Frequency: Fortnightly
- First issue: 1 January 1861
- Final issue: 4 January 1862
- Country: Russian Empire
- Based in: Moscow
- Language: Russian

Russkaya Rech (Russian: Русская речь, Russian Speech) was a Russian fortnightly literary and political magazine which was launched in Moscow on 1 January 1861 by the writer and journalist Evgenya Tur who went on to become also its editor.

Defined originally as "the review of literature, art and history in Russia and in the West," on 14 May of that year it joined forces with the Moscow Herald (Московский вестник) and, under the new title, Russkaya Rech and Moskovsky Vestnik, changed profile, becoming a political, moderately liberal publication. Starting with the No.39 issue, the journalist and publicist Evgeny Feoktistov became the magazine's editor-in-chief, as well as the head of its current politics section.

Other key figures of the magazine's staff were Fyodor Buslayev (foreign literature and history) and Nikolai Tikhonravov (Russian literature and history), with Evgenya Tur running the literary criticism section, where she published her essays on Mikhail Avdeyev, Vsevolod Krestovsky, Nadezhda Khvoshchinskaya and Fyodor Dostoyevsky.

Among the authors who contributed to the magazine regularly were Alexander Afanasyev, Genrikh Vyzinsky, Apollon Golovachyov, Pavel Zabelin, Dmitry Kachenovsky, Nadezhda Kokhanovskaya, Alexander Levitov, Nikolai Leskov, Nil Popov, Mikhail De Pulet, Mikhail Semevsky, Vasily Sleptsov, Sergey Solovyov and Alexey Suvorin (using the pseudonym Vasily Markov).

The magazine's final issue came out on 4 January 1862, its closure being the result of Tur's leaving Russia for France.
