= Mikhail Avdeev =

Mikhail Avdeev may refer to:

- Mikhail Avdeev (writer)
- Mikhail Avdeev (politician)
