= Avdotya Panaeva =

Russian writer and literary salon holder (1820-1893)

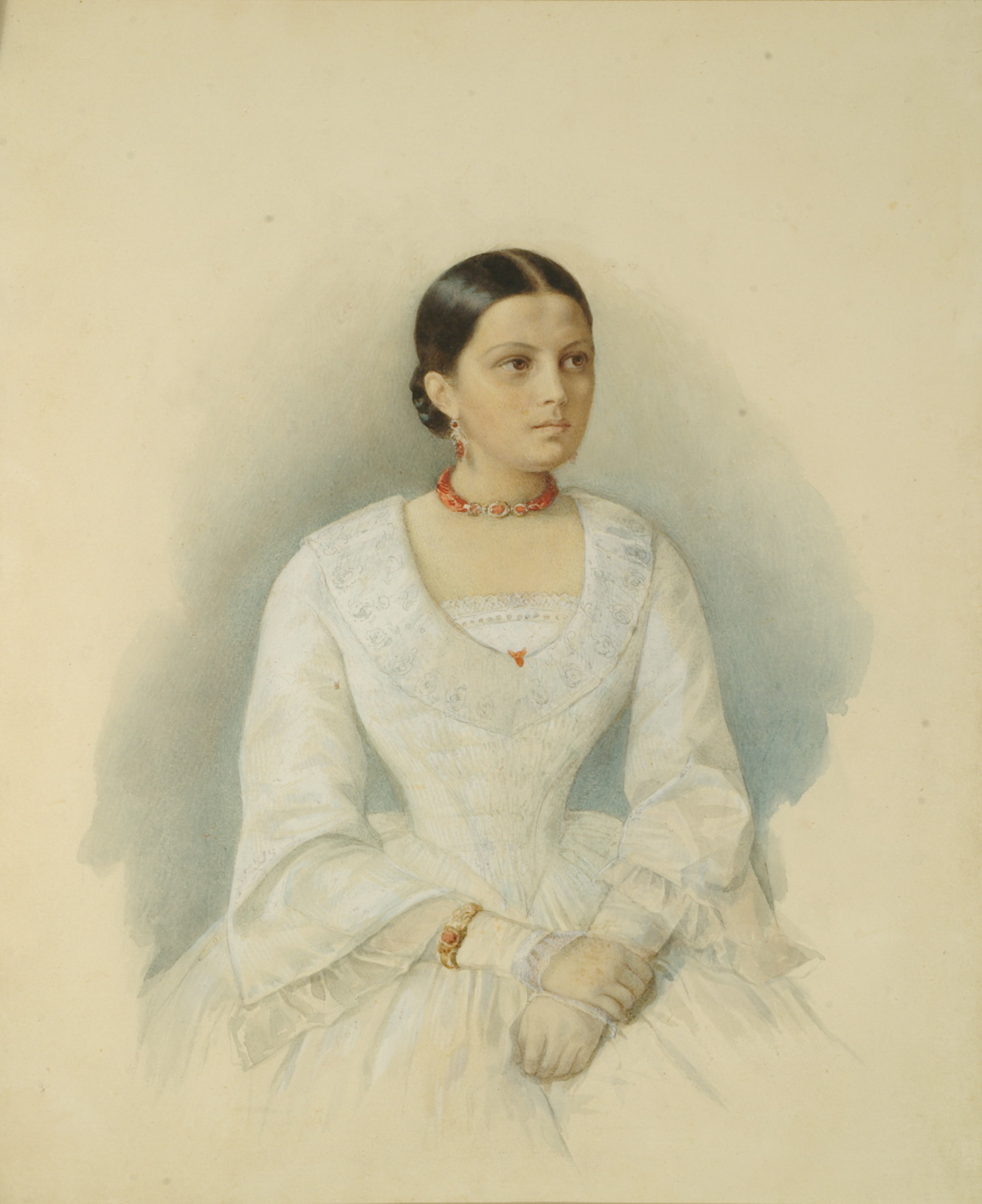
- Portrait by Kirill Gorbunov, 1841, watercolor; Pushkin Museums, St. Petersburg
- Born: August 12, 1820; Saint Petersburg
- Died: April 11, 1893 (aged 72); Saint Petersburg
- Resting place: Literatorskiye Mostki, Saint Petersburg
- Occupations: Novelist; Short story writer; Literary salon holder; Memorist
- Spouse(s): Ivan Panaev (m. 1839; died 1862) Apollon Golovachyov (m. 1864; died 1877)
- Partner: Nikolay Nekrasov (during 1846–1863)
- Writing career
- Notable works: The Talnikov Family (1848); A Woman's Lot (1862); Memories (1889)

Avdotya Yakovlevna Panaeva (Russian: Авдо́тья Я́ковлевна Пана́ева), née Bryanskaya (August 12 [O.S. July 31] 1820 – April 11 [O.S. March 30] 1893), was a Russian novelist, short story writer, memoirist and literary salon holder. She worked closely with writers Ivan Panaev, Nikolay Nekrasov, and Vissarion Belinsky to run the literary journal Sovremennik. She was a frequent contributor to Sovremennik and published much of her work under the male pseudonym N. Stanitsky. Her fiction sheds light on social injustice and the emancipation of women. Her best known work is her novel The Talnikov Family (1848), published in English in 2024 by Columbia University Press.

== Early life and education ==
Panaeva was born in Saint Petersburg into an artistic family. The first line of her memoir, Memories 1824-1870, reads: "I was born and raised in the theater." Both of her parents were actors of the imperial theaters in Saint Petersburg. Her father, Yakov Grigorievich (1791–1853) was a tragic actor of the classical school, and her mother, Anna Matveyevna (1798–1878) Bryansky sang opera and appeared in dramatic performances. Her godfather was Prince A. A. Shakhovsky, who was considered the theater's best teacher of theatrical art and in charge of its repertoire.

During her childhood, the Bryansky's lived in a government house overlooking the Yekaterininsky Canal, where apartments were given to family artists and theater officials.

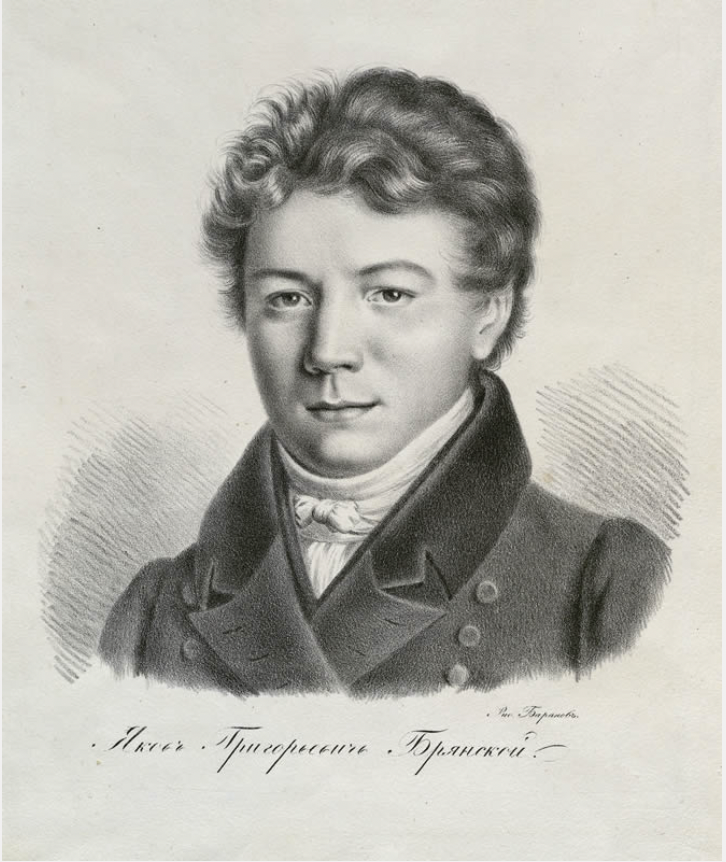
Etching of Yakov Grigorievich Bryansky (Grigoriev) by V.V. Baranov from 1820.

Panaeva was educated at home, and only briefly attended the ballet class at the Saint Petersburg State Theatre Arts Academy. Despite the wishes of her mother, close family friend and ballet master, Charles Didelot's desires for Panaeva to entertain a career as a dancer, she did not obey: "By Didelot's grace, they began to prepare me to be a dancer, which drove me to despair... I would very willingly have prepared myself to be a singer, a dramatic actress, but not a dancer." She never established a career in theater. It was through the theater that Panaeva met her first husband, the young writer Ivan Panaev. Panaev offered his personal translation of Othello to Panaeva's father to use for a production and courted her.

== Writing career and Sovremennik ==
Vissarion Belinsky was the first writer Panaeva met through Panaev the day after the couple arrived to Moscow, and it was he who encouraged her to begin writing. In 1846, Panaeva encouraged Panaev and Nekrasov to buy P.A. Pletnev's literary magazine Sovremennik. She hosted literary evenings at home for Sovremennik contributors and their friends. In 1845, Fyodor Dostoyevsky read his first novel Poor Folk to a literary gathering organized by Panaeva and Panaev. Dostoyevsky became a frequent visitor to their salon and fell in love with Panaeva. The writer brought out some of Panaeva's features in the heroine Nastasya Filippovna in the novel The Idiot. Dostoyevsky stopped attending the salon after arguing with Ivan Turgenev. Other salon visitors included Leo Tolstoy, Ivan Goncharov, Alexander Herzen, Vissarion Belinsky and Nikolai Chernyshevsky.

Panaeva co-authored the journal's fashion column with Panaev. The fashion column was the first of its kind, offering a journalistic tone rather than unopinionated reportage of Parisian trends. They offered fashion advice to readers in the form of parodic sketches, textual advertisements, novellas and epistolary exchanges. Panaeva published many stories in Sovremennik under the male pseudonym N. Stanitsky including: "A Careless Word", "An Ugly Husband", "A Watchmaker's Wife" (1849), "Apiary" (1849), "Domestic Hell" (1857), "A Capricious Woman", "A Rash Step", and "Little Things in Life". Her most notable contribution to the journal was The Talnikov Family (1848), which was omitted due to censorship.

Panaeva collaborated with both Panaev and Nekrasov. She and Nekrasov published two novels together: Three Countries of the World (1848–49) and The Dead Lake (1851), the former being the first published collaborative novel.

== Notable works ==
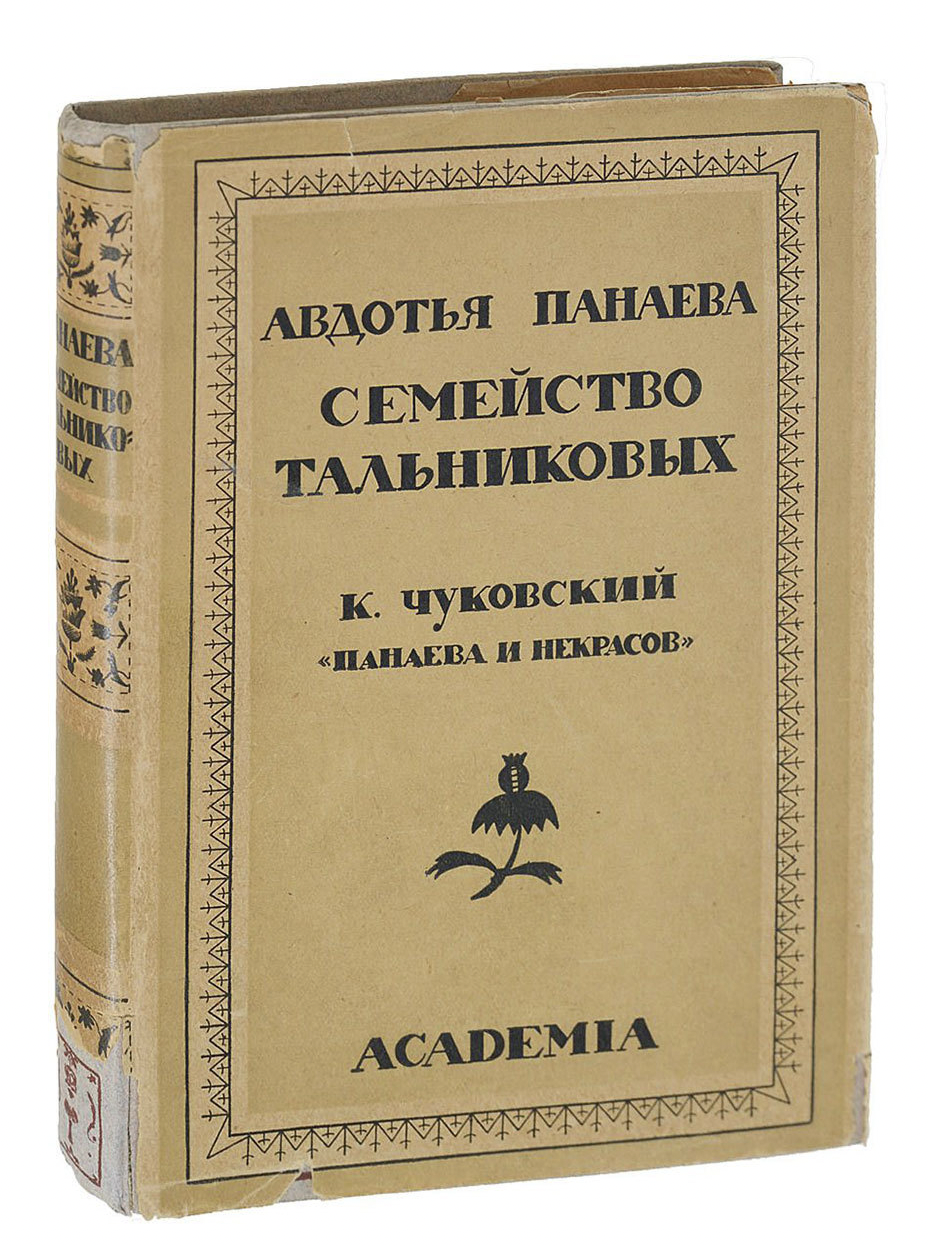
The Talnikov Family, 1928 edition by Academia, with a preface by Korney Chukovsky

=== The Talnikov Family (1848) ===
The Talnikov Family was written in 1847 and published by Nekrasov in the "Illustrated Almanac", which was promised as a bonus, to annual subscribers of Sovremennik. The publication of the Almanac coincided with the February Revolution in France (1848), and the secret censorship committee banned the work from publication for being too revolutionary. Panaeva recounts in Memories: "the chairman of the committee, Count Buturlin, personally made notes in the margins of her story: 'cynical', 'implausible', 'immoral', and in conclusion he wrote: 'I do not allow it for immorality and undermining parental authority.'"

Major works chronologically: The Talnikov Family (1848), The Steppe Lady (1853), Castles in the Air (1855), A Woman's Lot (1862), A Novel in the Petersburg Half-World (1863), The Dreamer (1864), Memories 1824-1870 (1889).

=== Memories 1824-1870 (1889) ===
Her memoirs, Memories, were written near the end of Panaeva's life and published in the journal Istorichesky Vestnik, but they were likely written for Sovremennik around 1860 or 1861. She wrote Memories shortly before her death on the advice of A. N. Pypin. The first complete edition of Panaeva's Memories was prepared for the press by Korney Chukovsky. Her memoirs serve as essential primary sources on the lives of many of her contemporaries.

== Personal affairs ==
Panaeva met her first husband, Ivan Panaev, while he was collaborating on a theater production of Othello with her father. Panaev's love for Panaeva was not initially supported by his mother as she was the daughter of an acting family. Panaev unsuccessfully sought his mother's consent for two and a half years to marry Panaeva before the couple married in secret in the spring of 1839 when Panaeva was 18 years old. The couple moved to Moscow after their wedding and later settled in an apartment in St. Petersburg. Panaeva was introduced to Panaev's large circle of literary friends. Panaev was reportedly unfaithful to Panaeva throughout their marriage, and was perceived by their peers as indifferent to infidelity on her end of their relationship.

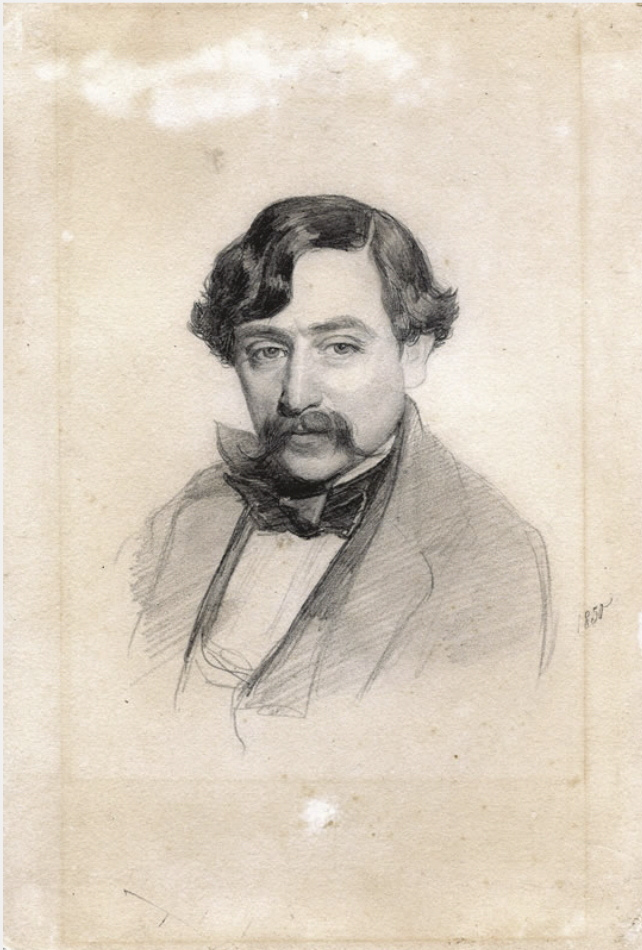
Ivan Panaev in 1850, drawn by Kirill Gorbunov

Panaeva met the poet and author Nikolay Nekrasov in the winter of 1842 when Vissarion Belinsky brought him to the Panaev's apartment to read his "Petersburg Corners" novella. Nekrasov fell in love with Panaeva and was rejected by her repeatedly. In 1846, as a response to a confession of love from Nekrasov, Panaeva exclaimed: "All of you, gentlemen phrase-mongers, are ready to make any sacrifice in words... but don't throw yourself into the water for me." Nekrasov threw himself from the boat into the Volga River in an act of devotion. In 1848, she became the common-law wife of Nekrasov while still married to Panaev, and the three of them resided in the Panaev's apartment. Nekrasov, being a co-owner of the couple's literary journal, Sovremennik, took up residence in the Panaev's apartment where the journal's editorial office was. Their passionate and complicated relationship lasted until the death of Panaev in 1861. They remained friends for long after.

Poems by Nekrasov dedicated to Panaeva: "Struck by an irretrievable loss", "I don't like your irony", "You and I are stupid people", "Yes, our life flowed rebelliously", "So this is a joke? My dear", "Long ago - rejected by you", "Forgive me! Do not remember the days of fall", "A heavy cross fell to her lot", "A hard year - illness broke me", "Ah! what exile, imprisonment!", "A restless heart beats", "All attachments are broken."

In 1866, Panaeva married Apollon Golovachev, a former employee of the Sovremennik editorial board. The same year, they had a daughter Yevdokia Nagrodskaya (1866–1930). Both Nekrasov and Golovachev died in 1877.

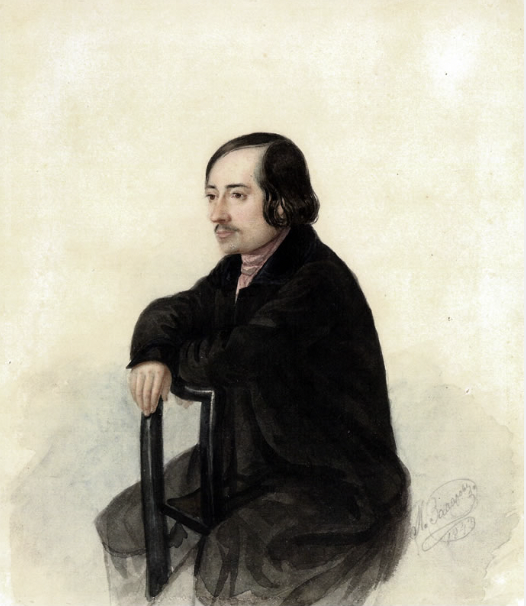
Nikolai Alekseevich Nekrasov. 1843 Paper, watercolor by I. D. Zakharov

== Legacy and reception ==
Panaeva had one daughter, Yevdokia Nagrodskaya (1866–1930), by her second husband Apollon Golovachev. Yevdokia was also a writer. Panaeva was pregnant twice before having her daughter, once with Panaev, and once with Nekrasov, but both children died as infants.

In 2020, the Pushkin Museum dedicated a digital exhibition toward Panaeva, titled "Impossible Woman" to celebrate the 200th anniversary of her birth.

The Talnikov Family (1848) was published in English in 2024 by Columbia University Press.

Carr, E.H. “Review: [Untitled].” The Slavonic and East European Review 8, no. 23 (1929): 458-460. https://www.jstor.org/stable/4202425

Chukovsky, Korney. “About the Talnikov Family.” From ChukFamily, 1928. https://www.chukfamily.ru/kornei/prosa/articles/o-semejstve-talnikovyx

Chukovsky, Korney. “Panaeva.” From Nekrasov Literature. Accessed March 13, 2025. http://nekrasov-lit.ru/nekrasov/bio/panaeva/ocherk-chukovskogo.htm

“Impossible Woman: Avdotya Panaeva.” All-Russian Museum of A.S. Pushkin, 2020. https://www.museumpushkin.ru/panaeva/

Kafanova, Olga. “Avdotya Panaeva Between Public and Private Space.” ILCEA 29 (2017). https://doi.org/10.4000/ilcea.4296

Lacan, Sanja. “Narrative Re/Styling: Text and Fashion in Nineteenth-Century Russian Literature and Culture.” UCLA, 2018. https://escholarship.org/content/qt16t4g8s0/qt16t4g8s0_noSplash_8195a69785a556f2d5fafd0e2a84c5c2.pdf

O. L. “The Female Canon.” From Polka Academy. Accessed March 13, 2025. https://polka.academy/materials/671

Panaeva, Avdotya. “The Steppe Lady.” In Datcha on the Peterhof Road: Prose of Russian Women Writers of the First Half of the 19th Century. Moscow: Sovremnnik, 1986. http://az.lib.ru/p/panaewa_a_j/text_0040.shtml

Panaeva, Avdotya. Memories. Leningrad: Kubuch Publishing House, 1926. http://az.lib.ru/p/panaewa_a_j/text_0010.shtml

Panaeva, Avdotya. The Talnikov Family. Moscow: State Publishing House of Fiction, 1852. http://az.lib.ru/p/panaewa_a_j/text_0030.shtml

Panaeva, Avdotya. The Talnikov Family. New York: Colombia University Press, 2024.

Vaysman, Margarita. “A Woman's Lot: Realism and Gendered Narration in Russian Women's Writing of the 1860s.” The Russian Review 80, no 2. (2021): 229-245. https://doi.org/10.1111/russ.12311

Zubkov, Kirill. “Self-Critical Realism: Three New Books on Russian Mid-Nineteenth-Century Fiction.” Russian Literature 130 (2022): 95-109. https://doi.org/10.1016/j.ruslit.2022.03.001

Footnotes:
