= Elena Nikandrovna Klokacheva =

Russian artist (born 1871)

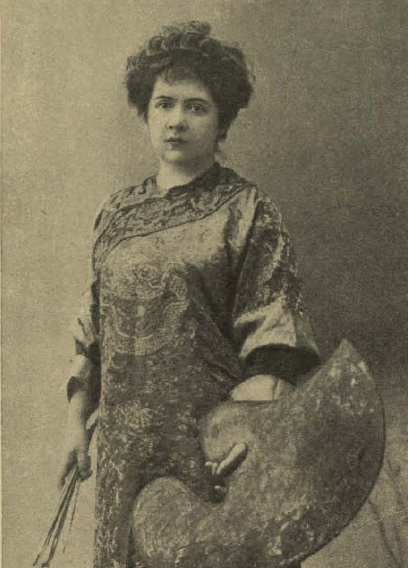
- Photograph of Elena Nikandrovna Klokacheva, 1907
- Born: 25 November 1871
- Died: after 1943
- Education: Imperial Academy of Arts, Saint Petersburg (1891-92)
- Known for: Painter
- Movement: Orientalist

Elena Nikandrovna Klokacheva (Russian: Елена Никандровна Клокачёва, also known as Klakachova (Клакачова) and Klakacheva (Клакачева); Saint Petersburg, Russia, 25 November 1871 – not before 1943), was a painter mainly known by one of the few existing portraits of Rasputín, now at the Hermitage. In 1942 and 1943, during the Siege of Leningrad, she draw some portraits of Spanish military physicians belonging to the Wehrmacht Blue Division.

== Early life and education ==
Elena Nikandrovna Klokacheva was born in a distinguished navy officers family. Fedot Alekséevich Klokachev (Федот Алексеевич Клокачёв,1739-1783), Vice admiral of the Black Sea fleet, was Klokacheva's great-great-grandfather. Her father, Nikandr Nikolaevich Klokachev (Никандр Николаевич Клокачёв), was Rear admiral. Her sister, Liubov (Любовь), was married to the pathologist Nikolai Vasílevich Petrov (Никола́й Васи́льевич Петро́в).

She studied at the Gymnasium "Maria Nikolaevna Stoiunina" and, since 1891, at the Imperial Academy of Arts.

== Personal life ==
Since 1902 she appeared in the directory All Petersburg (Весь Петербург), sometimes as Klokacheva and others as Klakacheva, with different addresses. Since 1906 she lived in Serguiévskaya street that changed its name to Tchaikovsky street in 1923. From 1917 on, her name disappears from the directory. Since 1922 she lived in Pavlovsk.

In 1910, the writer Evdokiia Nagródskaia (Евдокия Аполлоновна Нагродская) dedicated to Klokachova her novel The Wrath of Dionysus (Гнев Диониса, Saint Petersburg,Тип. Н.Я. Стойковой, 1910).

In 1942 and 1943, the Spanish Blue Division, participating in the Siege of Leningrad, had a field dressing station in Pavlovsk. Klokacheva made charcoal portraits of some of the Spanish military physicians on assignment there. Their families hold two of these portraits in Spain.

The date and place of her death are unknown.

== Artistic career ==
She studied painting at the Imperial Academy of Arts in Saint Petersburg (Императорская Академия Xудожеств); during 1891 and 1892 with Pavel Chistiakov and then with Pavel Kovalevsky (Ковалевский, Павел Осипович). In 1899 she went to Munich to study with the Slovene painter Anton Ažbe and with Franz von Lenbach.

Klokacheva took part in some of the exhibitions of the Peredvizhniki (The Wanderers or The Itinerants) group whose best known member was Ilya Repin.

In 1901 she was entitled "artist” (Russian: художника) for her picture “Behind the scenes” (За кулисами). The academy had accepted full membership of women just in 1873.

At the beginning of the 20th century she traveled to Tunisia, Sicily and to Russian Turkestan from where he drew inspiration for many of his Orientalist-style works.

In 1907, the academy acquired her work At the circus; her picture Hard days and a portrait of her friend, the art historian Olga Bazankur (Ольга Георгиевна Базанкур-Штейнфельд) were exhibited in Saint Petersburg and Moscow.

In 1909 she took part in the spring exhibition at the Imperial Academy of Arts with her work “Satyr and nymph”.

Klokacheva participated in the artistic circles of her time in Saint Petersburg; she was friend with the writers Nadezhda Aleksandrovna Lukhmanova (Надежда Александровна Лухманова) and Evdokiia Nagródskaia. At the Imperial Academy some of her colleagues were Maria Alekseevna Fedorova (Мария Алексеевна Фёдорова), Elizabeta Mikhailovna Martynova (Елизавета Михайловна Мартынова), and Anna Petrovna Ostroumova-Lebedeva. She posed for the photographer Elena Lukinichna Mrozovskaya -Helène de Mrosovsky- (Елена Лукинична Мрозовская).

He was a member of the St. Petersburg Society of Painters (Санкт-Петербургское общество художников (1890 —1918)).

== Works ==
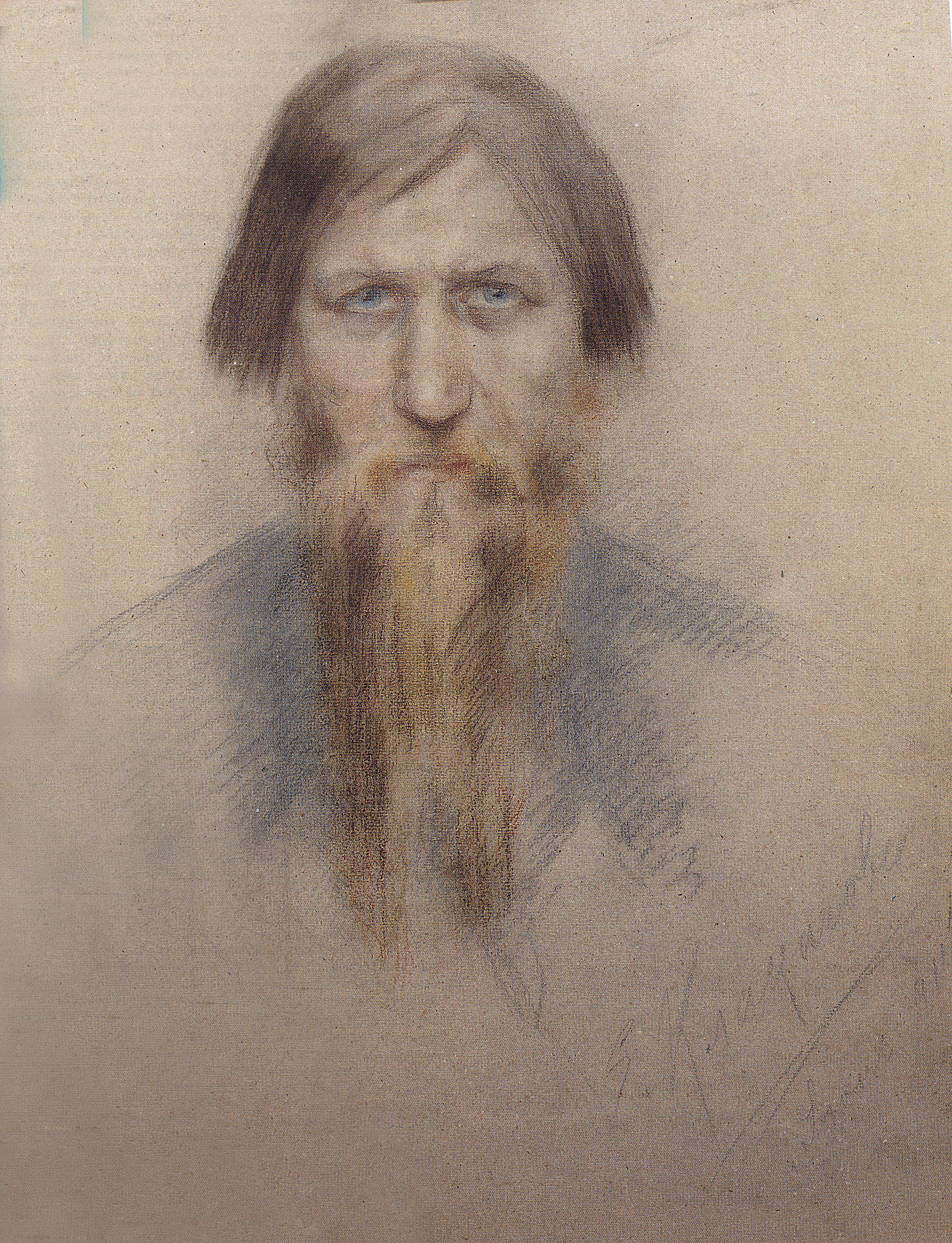
Portrait of Grigori Rasputin by E.N. Klokacheva,1914

- Portrait of Rasputin, signed and dated in 1914, colour pencils and pastel on grey card, 81.5 x 56 cm, Hermitage Museum, Saint Petersburg
- A scene from the life of the Boyars (Сцена из боярской жизни), signed, oil on canvas, 107 x 76 cm
- At the circus (В цирке, or За кулисами, or За кулисами цирка), 1901, oil, reproduced in Niva, 22, 1902, p. 429
- Icarus (Икар or Смерть Икара),1901, oil, reproduced in the magazine Niva (Нива), 6, 1902, pág. 104 and in postcards at the turn of the 20th century
- Carousel (Карусель), 1904, oil
- Г-жи Л. К, (Note: Her sister Любовь Никандровна Клокачева?) 1904
- Portrait of Krasinski (Портрет гр. Красинской (Note: Probably Nikolai Fomich Krasisnki (1886—1938), Russian Николай Фомич Красинский, Belarusian actor)), 1905, colour pencils
- Young girl (Девочка), 1905
- Portrait of Olga Bazankur (Портрет г-жи О.Г. Базанкур), 1906, colour pencils, reproduced in Нива, 46, 1908, p. 798
- Hard days (Тяжелые дни), 1907, oil
- Portrait of general Aleksandr Kiriev (Александр Алексеевич Киреев), 1907, reproduced in Новое Время, February 14, 1907, p. 6
- Tartar women (Татарские женщины), 1908
- Portrait of M. A. Lishin (Портрет М. А. Лишина (Note: Михаил Андреевич Лишин?)), 1908
- Portrait of the artist Aksarina (Портрет артистки Аксариной (Note: Probably M. M. Aksarina, opera singer. Russian М. М. Аксарина)), 1909, colour pencils
- Satyr and nymph (Сатир и нимфа), 1909, pastel, reproduced in Огонëк, 10, 1909, p. 15, and in postcards at the turn of the 20th century
- Portrait of the Cech actress Bella Gorskaya (Бэлла Горская), 1911, colour pencils
- Legend of the knight Romuald of Burgundy (Легенда о рыцаре Ромуальде Бургундской or Рыцарь Ромуальд в очарованном лесу), 1911, oil

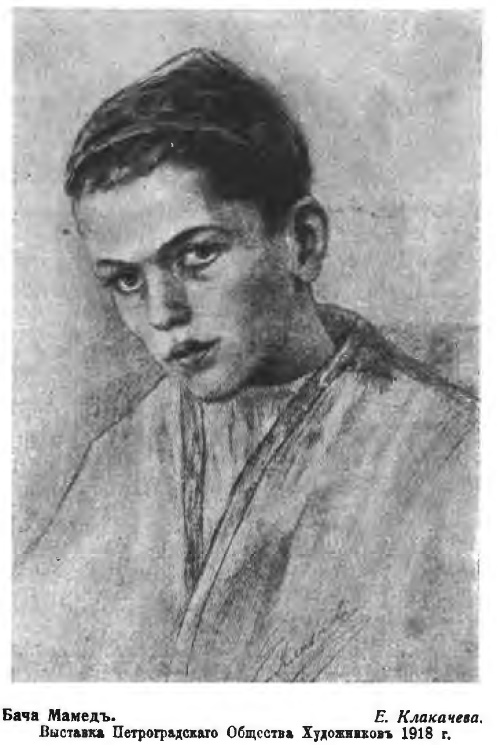
Bacha Mamed, E. Klokacheva, 1918

- The warrior or Churila Plenkovich (Витязь or Чурила Пленкович), 1911, reproduced in postcards at the turn of the 20th century
- Портрет арт. Миесс Мод Робертсон, 1911
- Portrait of the singer M. Karinskaya (Портрет певицы М. Каринской (Note: Probably Мария Александровна Каринская)), 1911
- Love (Любовь or Amore), 1912, oil, reproduced in postcards at the turn of the 20th century
- Portrait of Cardinal Rampolla, 1913, reproduced in Новое Время, December 14, 1913, p. 8
- Горе, 1913, oil
- At the Bazaar of Samarkand (На базаре Самарканд), 1914
- On the roofs of Samarkand (На крышах Самарканд), 1914, oil, reproduced in postcards at the turn of the 20th century
- Alley of Samarkand (Уличка Самарканд), 1915
- Portrait of count J. de Lalaing (Графъ Ж. де-Лалэнгъ (Note: Probably the Belgian painter Jacques de Lalaing (1858-1917))), 1915, reproduced in Новое Время, November 14, 1915, p. 11
- On the street (На улице), 1915, reproduced in Огонëк, 47, November 22, 1915
- Bazaar (Базар), 1915
- Portrait of the English Actress Douglas (Портрет Английской Артистки Дугласъ), 1915, reproduced in Огонëк, 47, November 22, 1915
- Tunisia (Тунис), 1917
- Portrait of the writer Pyotr Gnedich, Reproduced in Niva, 6, 1917, p. 95
- Portrait of Sergei Zavadsky (Сергей Владиславич Завадский), 1917
- Oriental tale (Восточная Сказка), 1918
- Bacha Mamed (Бача Мамед), reproduced in Нива, 18, 1918, p. 276
- Dream (Мечты), reproduced in postcards at the turn of the 20th century
- Gossip (Сплетни)
- The tsarevich swan (Царевич лебедь)
- Portraits of Christopher of Greece, Lev Kasso, and the general Ivan Dumbadze

== Gallery ==
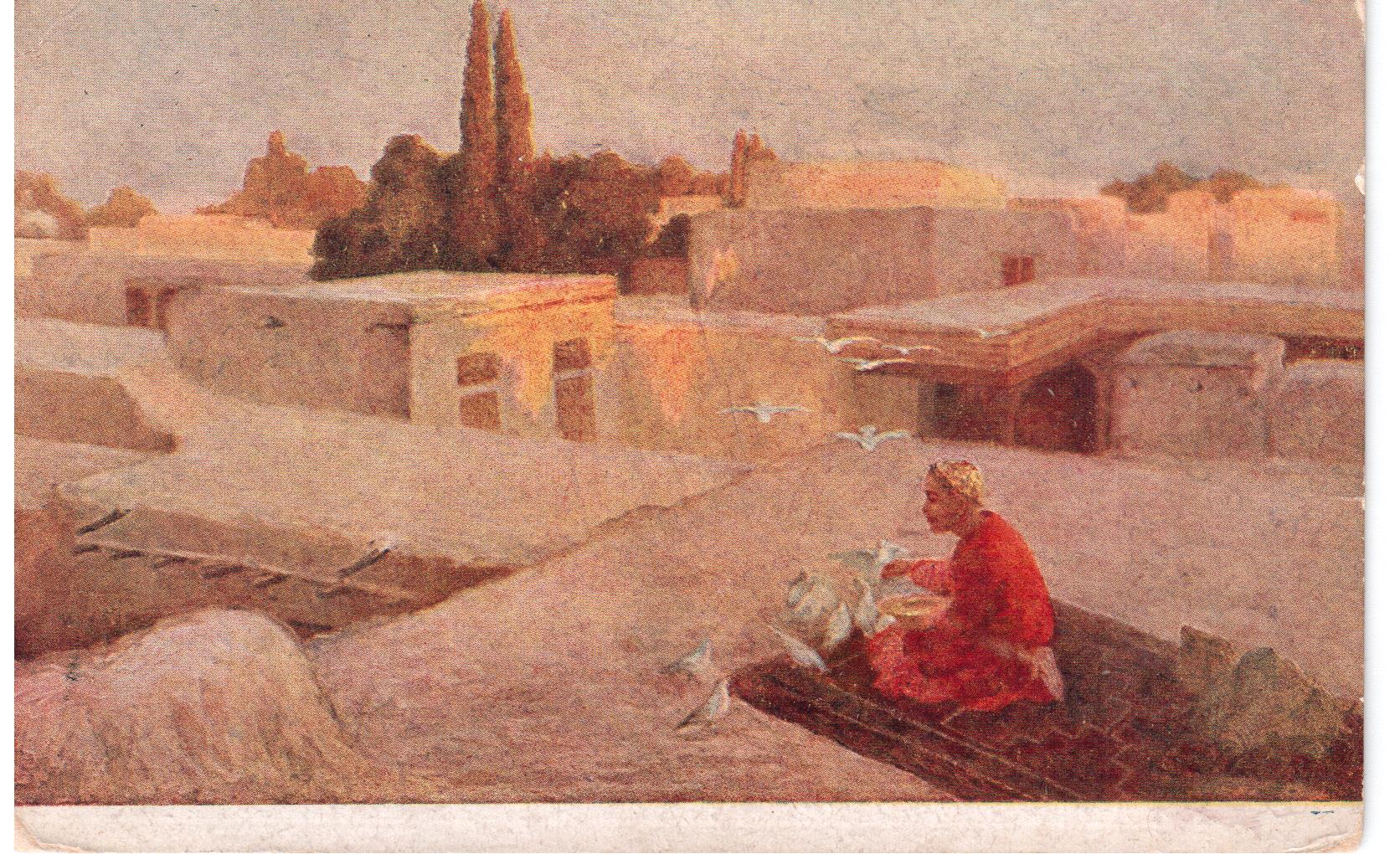
On the roofs of Samarkand (На крышах Самарканд), 1914, oil, reproduced in postcards in 1916

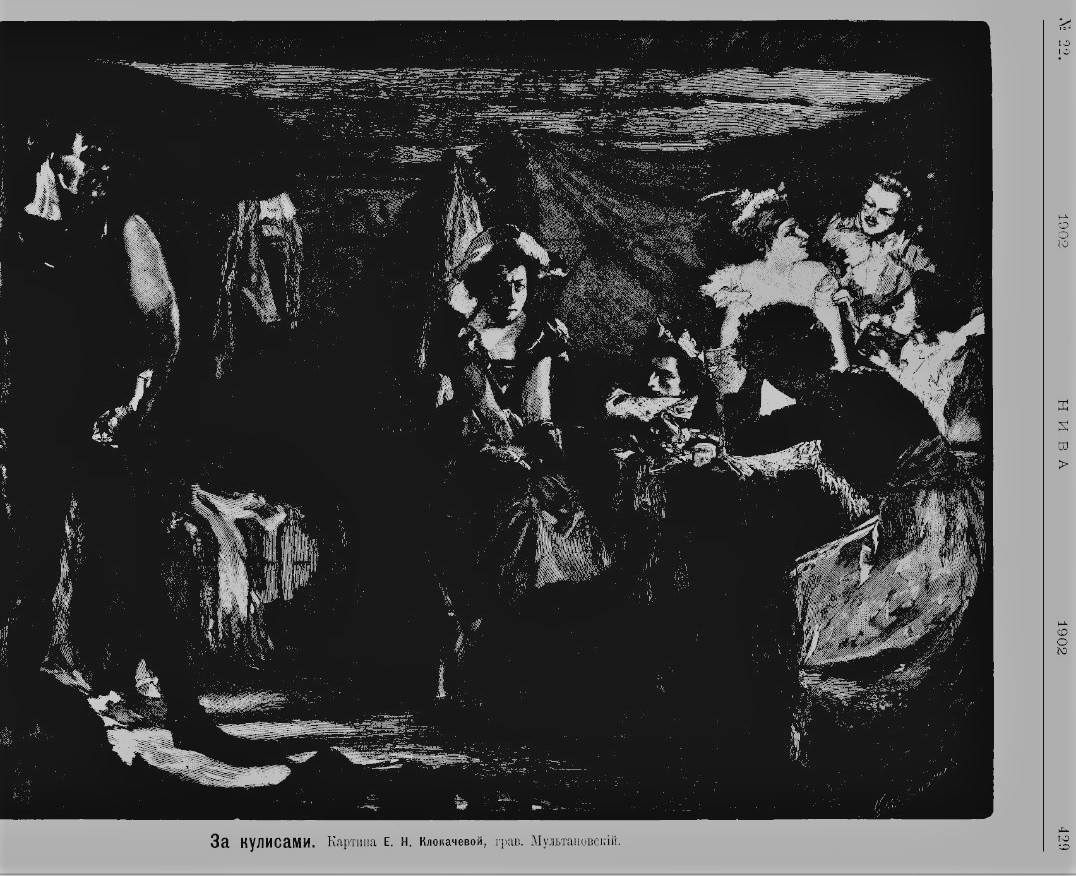
Behind the scenes (За кулисами), 1901, oil, reproduced in Niva, 22, 1902, p. 429
