= Kirill Gorbunov =

Russian painter

- Кирилл Антонович Горбунов
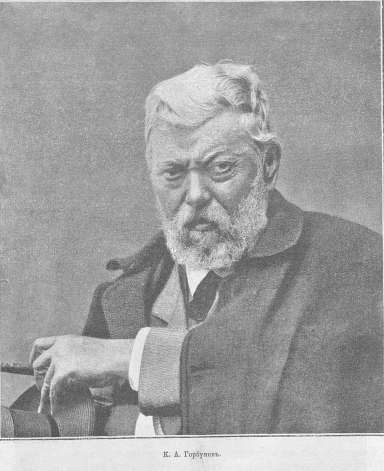
- Gorbunov during the 1880s, photograph
- Born: 1822; Chembarsky Uyezd, Penza Governorate
- Died: November 8, 1893 (aged 70–71); Tsarskoye Selo
- Resting place: Kazan Cemetery, Pushkin, St. Petersburg
- Education: Member Academy of Arts (1851)
- Known for: Portrait painting and drawing
- Notable work: Portraits of Vissarion Belinsky (from 1838 onwards)

Kirill Antonovich Gorbunov (Russian: Кири́лл Анто́нович Горбуно́в; 1822 (1815?), Vladikino, Penza Oblast — 8 November 1893, Tsarskoye Selo) was a Russian portrait painter and lithographer.

== Biography ==
He was born a serf. After displaying some artistic talent, he was sent to Moscow where, from 1836 to 1840, he studied art in a school operated by Karl Rabus. After graduating, he received a recommendation from Nikolai Gogol that enabled him to attend the Imperial Academy of Arts in St.Petersburg from 1840 to 1846, where he studied under Karl Bryullov.

In 1841 Bryullov, together with Vasily Zhukovsky, succeeded in obtaining Gorbunov's freedom. Upon his graduation from the Academy in 1846, he was granted the rights of a "неклассного художника" (Free Artist), which enabled him to set up his own studio. In 1851, his portrait of Alexei Markov earned him the title of Academician. He would eventually produce portraits of virtually every well-known literary figure in Russia (including a series of lithograph portraits commissioned by Alexander Herzen), as well as Tsars Alexander II and Alexander III. From 1851 to 1888 he was a teacher at the Smolny Institute. He later painted icons and frescoes at the Cathedral of Christ the Saviour and several other churches in St.Petersburg.

His major works may be seen in the Russian Museum and the Tretyakov Gallery.

== Selected portraits ==
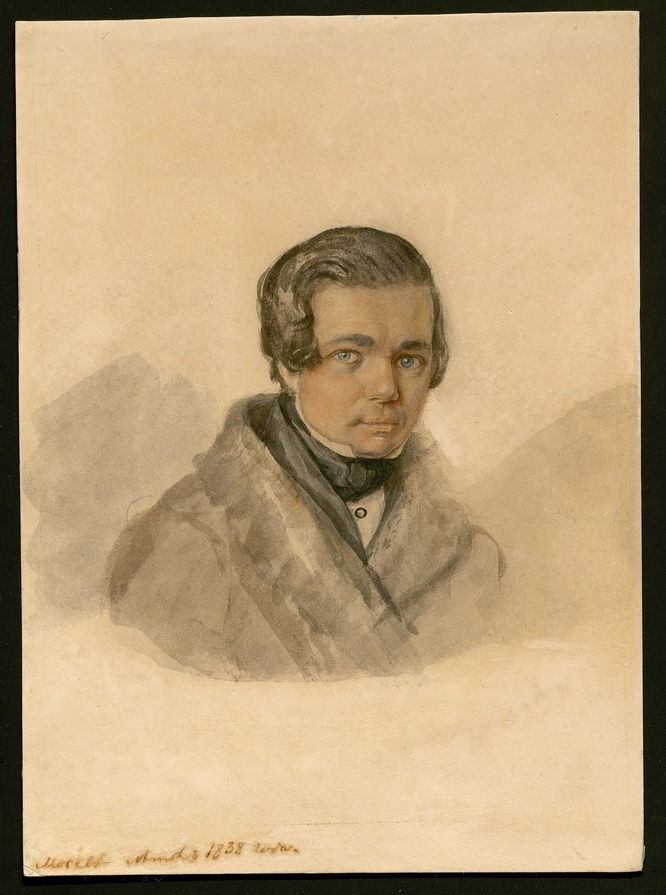
Alexei Koltsov, 1838, watercolor; Pushkin Museums, St. Petersburg, formerly in the Tretyakov Gallery, owned by Pavel Tretyakov as of 1872

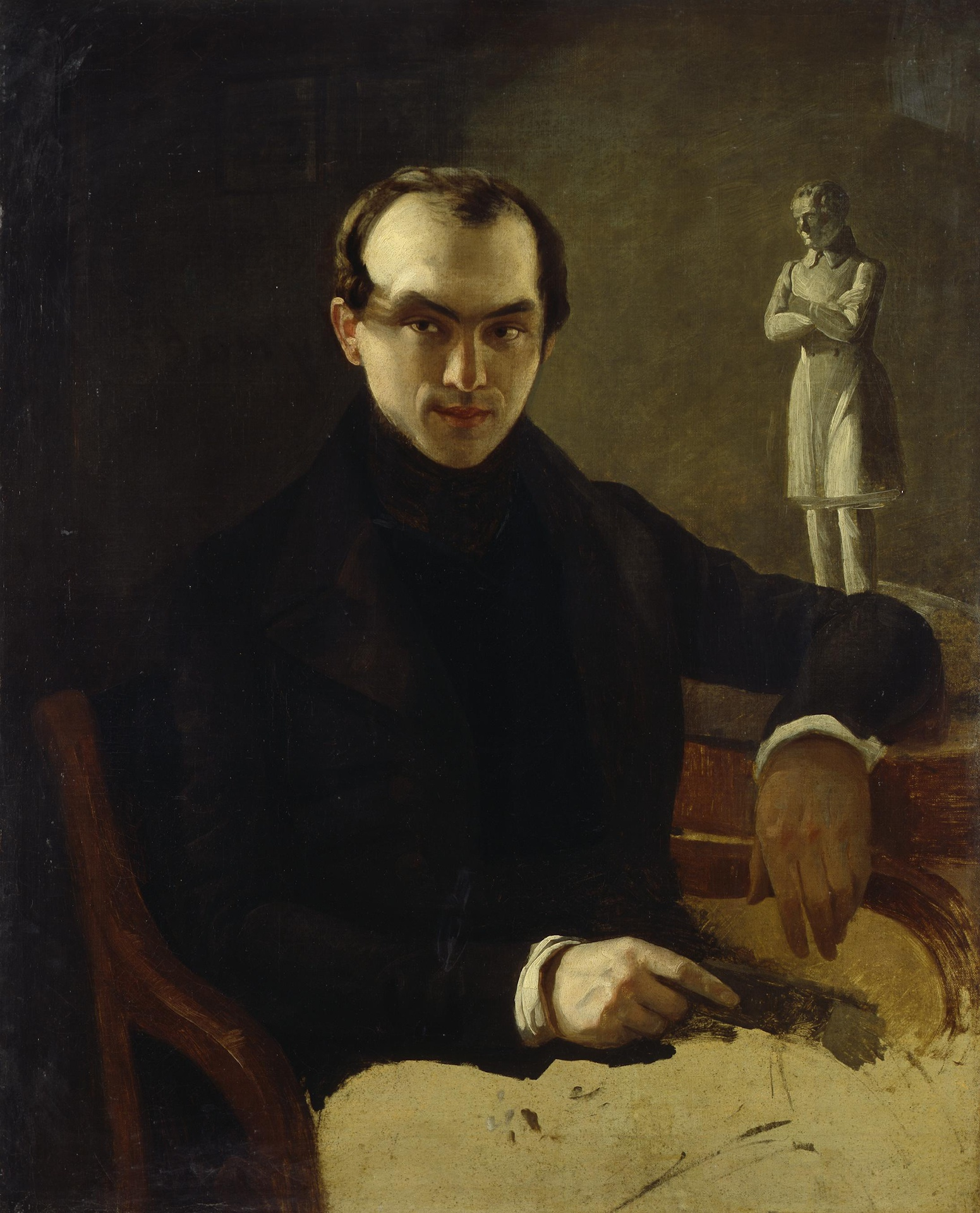
Vasily Botkin, c. 1838–1840, oils, unfinished; Hermitage Museum

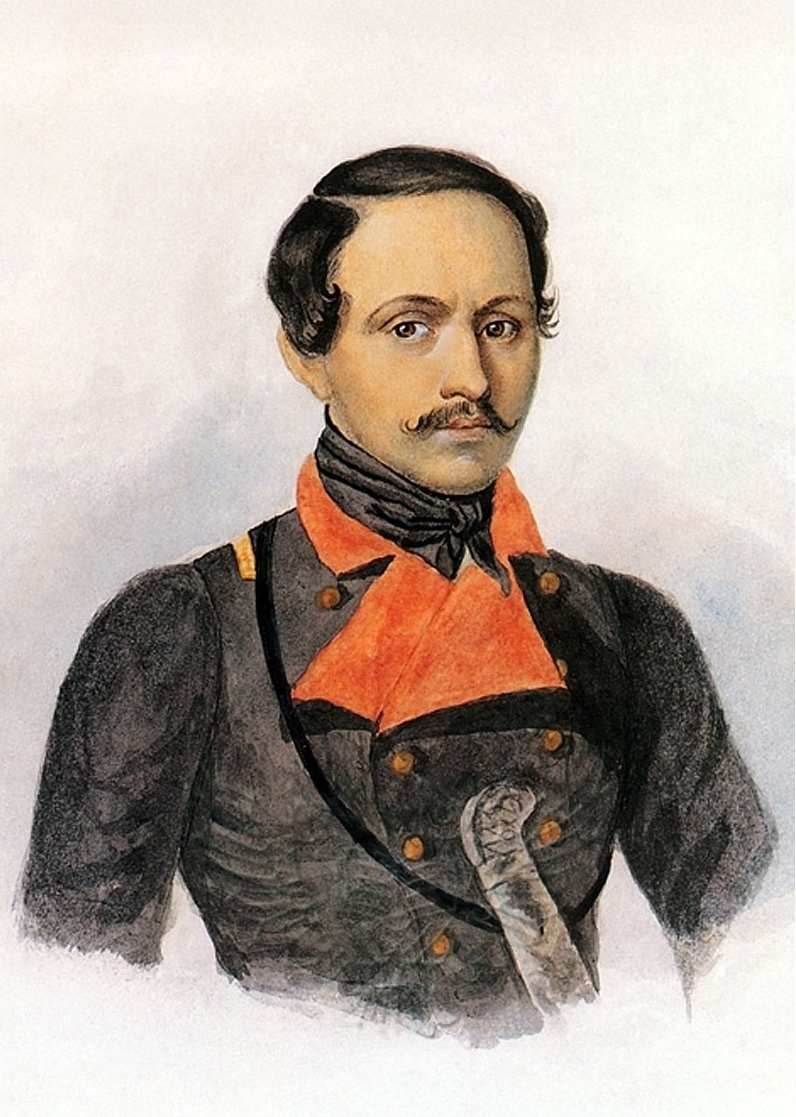
Mikhail Lermontov, 1841, watercolor; Pushkin House

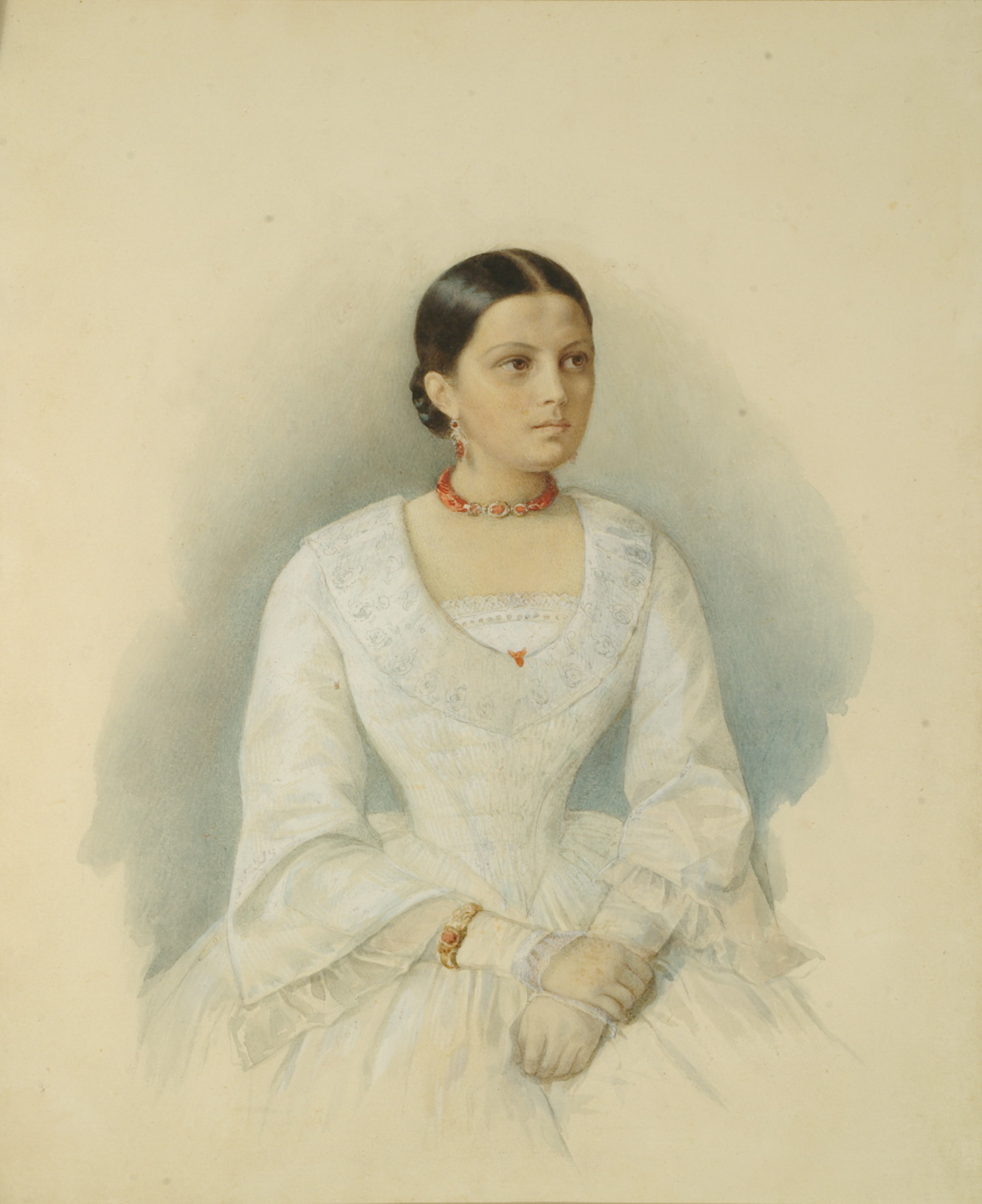
Avdotya Panaeva, 1841, watercolor; Pushkin Museums, St. Petersburg

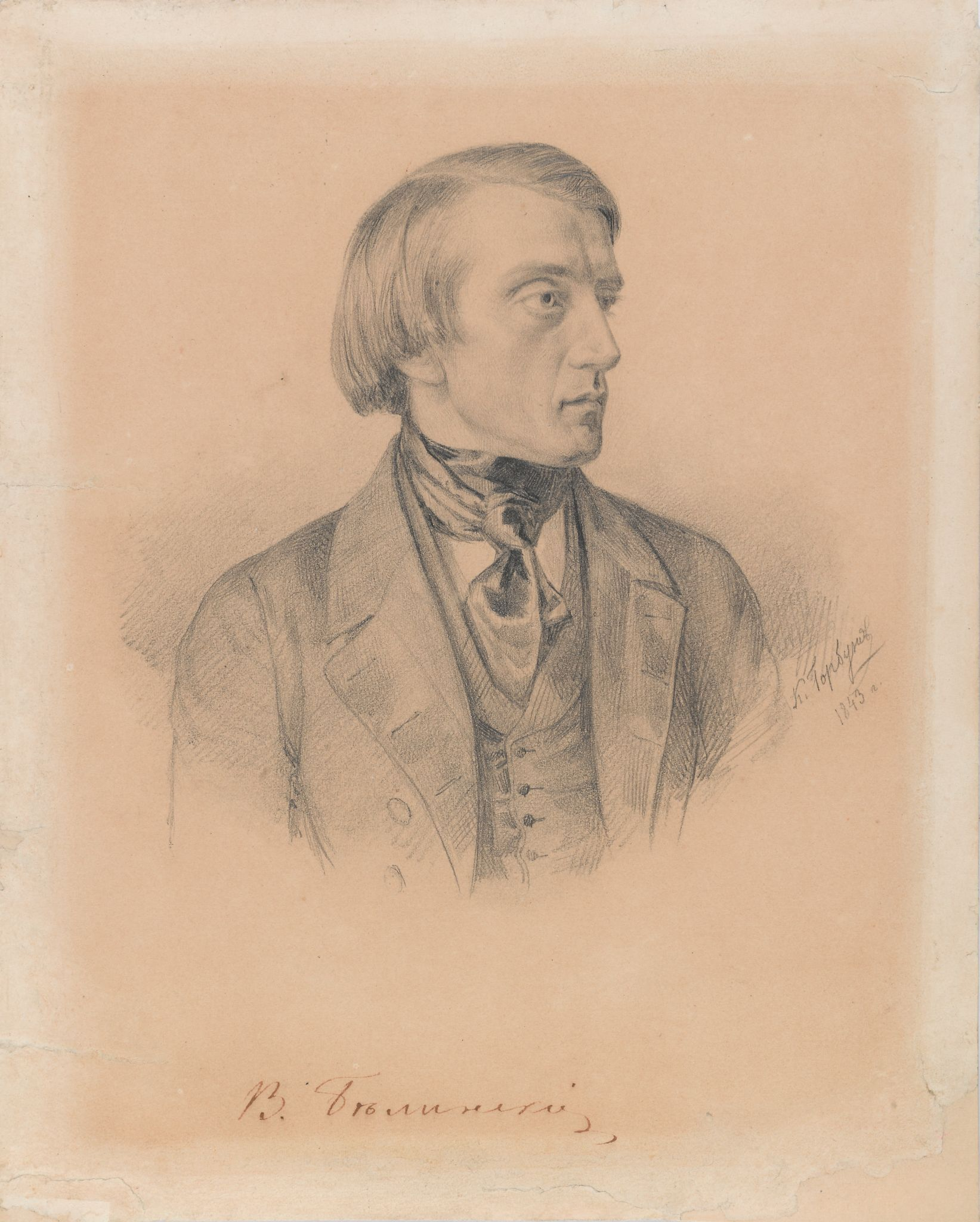
Vissarion Belinsky, 1843, graphite; Tretyakov Gallery

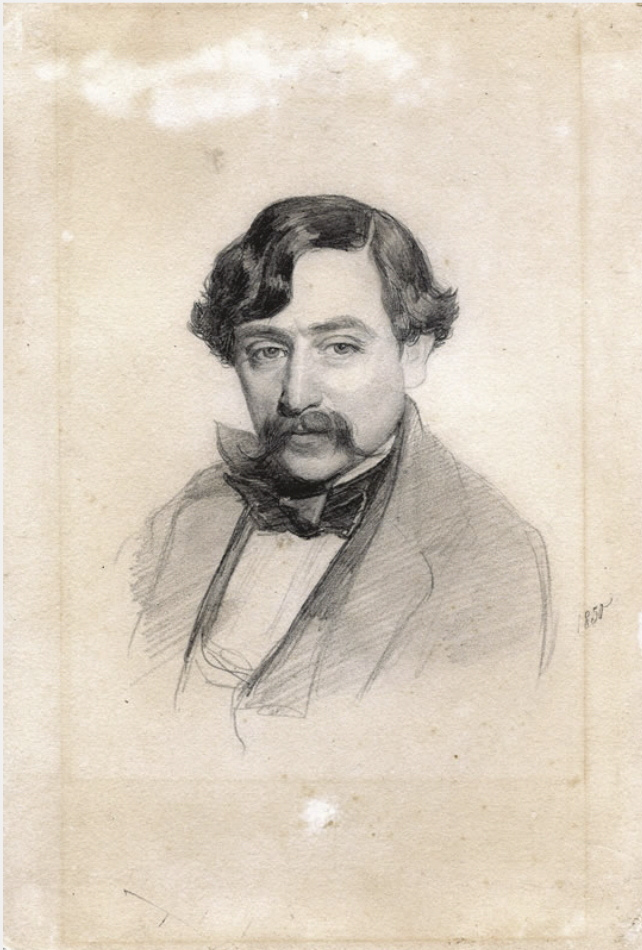
Ivan Panaev, 1850, graphite; Pushkin Museums, St. Petersburg

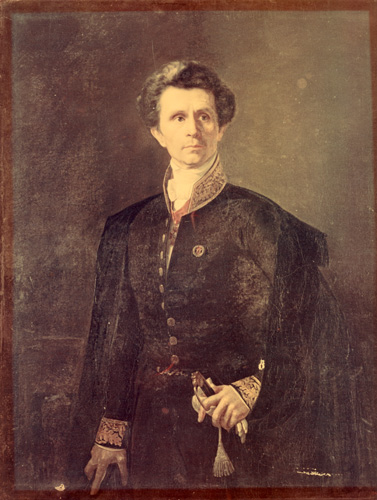
Alexey Tarasovich Markov, the reception piece for the Imperial Academician rank, 1851, oils; Russian Museum, formerly in the Museum of the Academy of Arts

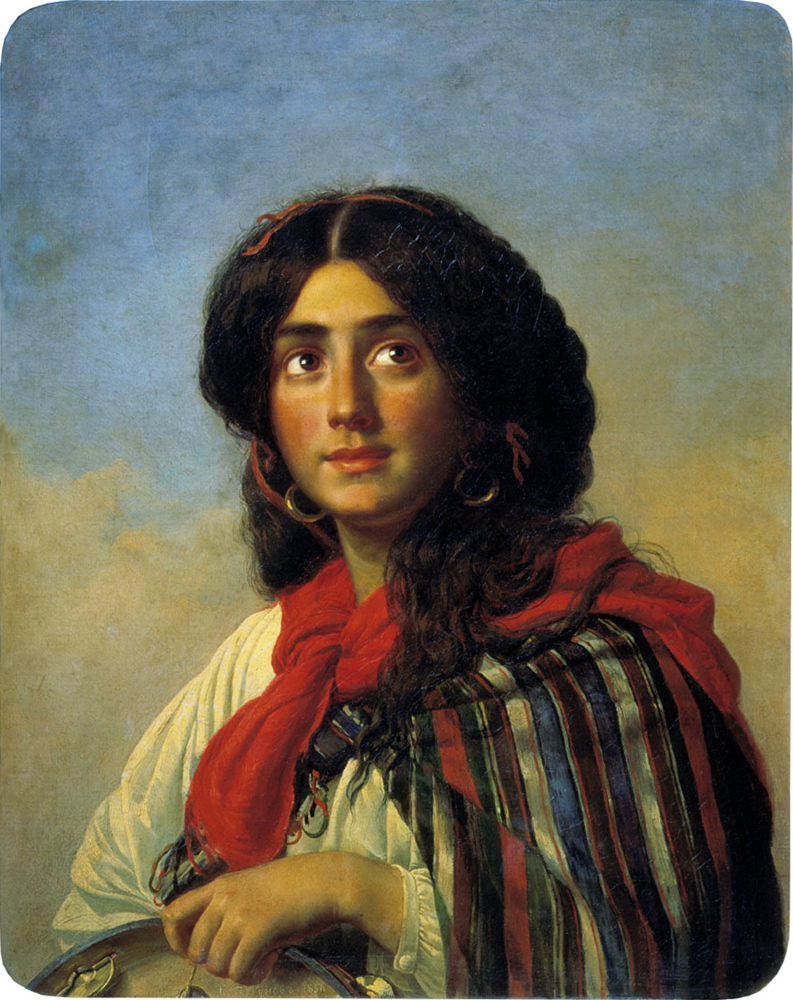
The Gypsy Woman, 1851, oils; Tretyakov Gallery, formerly in the Rumyantsev Museum, once owned by Feodor Pryanishnikov

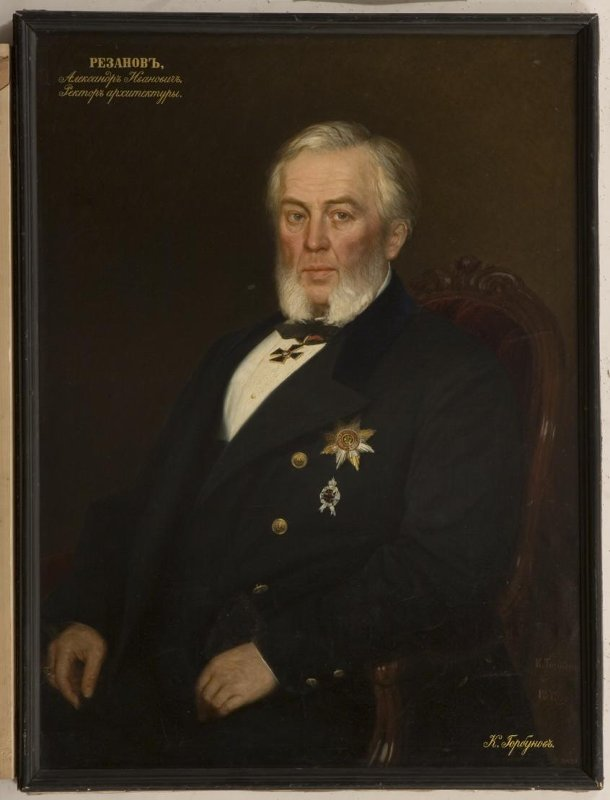
Alexander Rezanov, 1879, oils; Museum of the Academy of Arts, St. Petersburg
