= Evgeny Feoktistov =

Russian journalist (1828–1898)

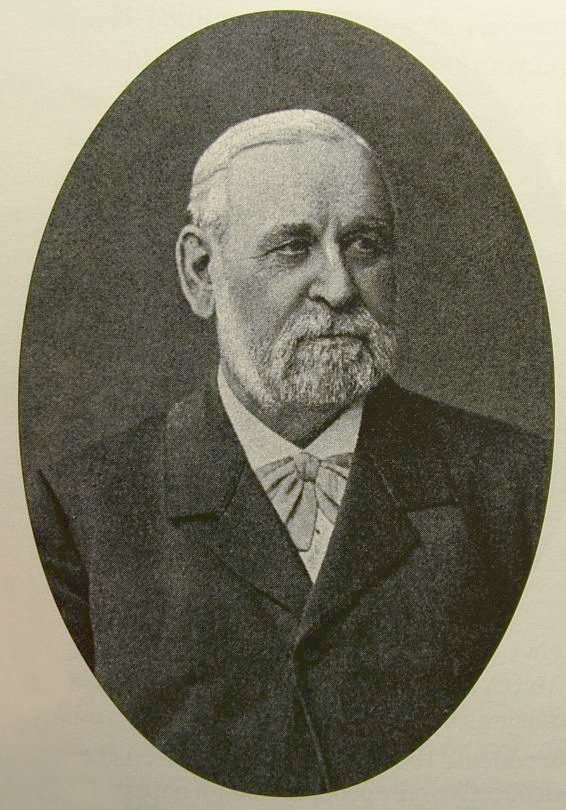
- Born: Evgeny Mikhaylovich Feoktistov; Евгений Михайлович Феоктистов; 1828; Kaluga, Russian Empire
- Died: 28 June 1898 (aged 69–70); Saint Petersburg, Russian Empire
- Occupations: historian, editor

Evgeny Mikhaylovich Feoktistov (Russian: Евгений Михайлович Феоктистов; 1828 – 28 June 1898) was a Kaluga-born Russian journalist, editor, historian and, later in his life, state official.

A Moscow University alumnus, Feoktistov started out as an essayist and journalist. Contributing to Moskovskiye Vedomosti, Russky Vestnik, Sovremennik, and Otechestvennye Zapiski, he published numerous articles on Russian history and current politics. Three of his major works came out as separate editions, "Greece's Fight for Independence" (1863), "Magnitsky. The Materials for the History of Education in Russia" (1865), and "Russia and Prussia's Relations in the Reign of Elizaveta Petrovna" (1882). He also edited Russkaya Rech and the Journal of the Ministry of Education.

Having started out as a liberal, Feoktisov later turned conservative and monarchist. In 1883–1896 he served as the head of the Interior Ministry's Press department (Russia's 'censor-in-chief'), his very name becoming the symbol of the severity of Alexander III's censorship. Once Otechestvennye Zapiski's respected author, he proved to be the one who finally closed this magazine, as well as the newspaper Golos. Ironically, Feoktistov's own memoirs Behind the Curtains of Politics and Literature (За кулисами политики и литературы), containing fierce criticism of the Tsarist bureaucracy and later compared to Saltykov-Shchedrin's satires, proved to be so contentious, they could be published only in 1929, in the Soviet Union.
