= Mikhail De Pulet =

Russian literary critic and historian

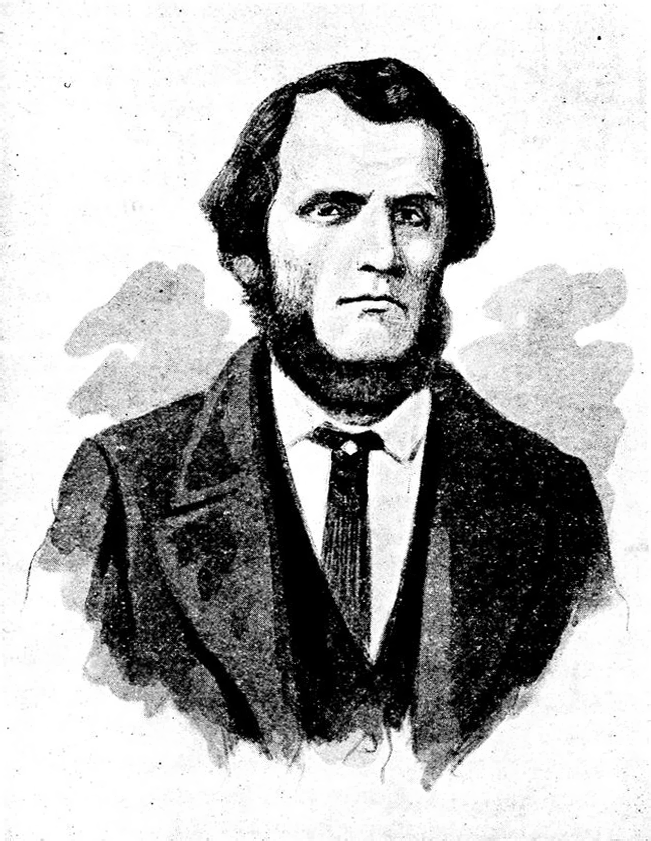
- Born: Mikhail Fyodorovich De Pulet; Михаил Фёдорович Де-Пуле; October 24, 1822; Khrennoye, Tambov Governorate, Russian Empire
- Died: September 8, 1885 (aged 62); Tambov, Russian Empire
- Occupations: literary critic and historian • pedagogue • editor
- Years active: 1857-1880s

Mikhail Fyodorovich De Pulet (Russian: Михаил Фёдорович Де-Пуле, 24 October 1822, village Khrennoye, Tambov Governorate, Russian Empire, — 8 September 1885, Tambov, Russian Empire) was a Russian literary critic and historian, publicist, journalist, editor and pedagogue.

A Kharkiv University alumnus (1842–1846), De Pulet started out as a teacher in Russian language and history in Voronezh, at the Mikhaylovsky Cadet Corps. In 1862–63 he edited the regional newspaper Voronezh Governorate News. In 1865 he was sent to Vilno as an inspector of the city's First Gymnasium and for three years (until 1868) co-edited (with A.I. Zabelin) the newspaper Vilensky Vestnik. Since 1857 De Pulet worked as a literary critic, first for Moskovskiye Vedomosti and later for Atheneum, Russkaya Beseda, Russky Vestnik, Den, Russkoye Slovo. At least two of his essays caused controversy and were discussed in the Russian press: "Some Things on Bugs and Moths. A View on Turgenev's Characters" (Vremya, 1861) and "Nihilism As a Pathology in Russian Life" (Novoye Vremya, 1881).

De Pulet compiled and edited the Voronezh Soliloqy. 1861, an almanac which featured the folklore materials collected by Alexey Koltsov, as well as the poem Taras and the novella Seminary Student, both by Ivan Nikitin. De Pulet's most valued work as a literary historian is the in-depth biography of Nikitin (originally in Vilensky Vestnik, then included into the Works by Nikitin, vol.1, 1869), as well as numerous biographical sketches on Koltsov. He authored two books, A Brief Guide for Studying Prose (Краткое руководство к изучению прозаических сочинений, 1866) and Old Writers and the New Pedagogical View on Them (Старые писатели и новые педагогические на них взгляды, 1869).
