= Ivan Panaev =

Russian writer, literary critic, journalist and magazine publisher

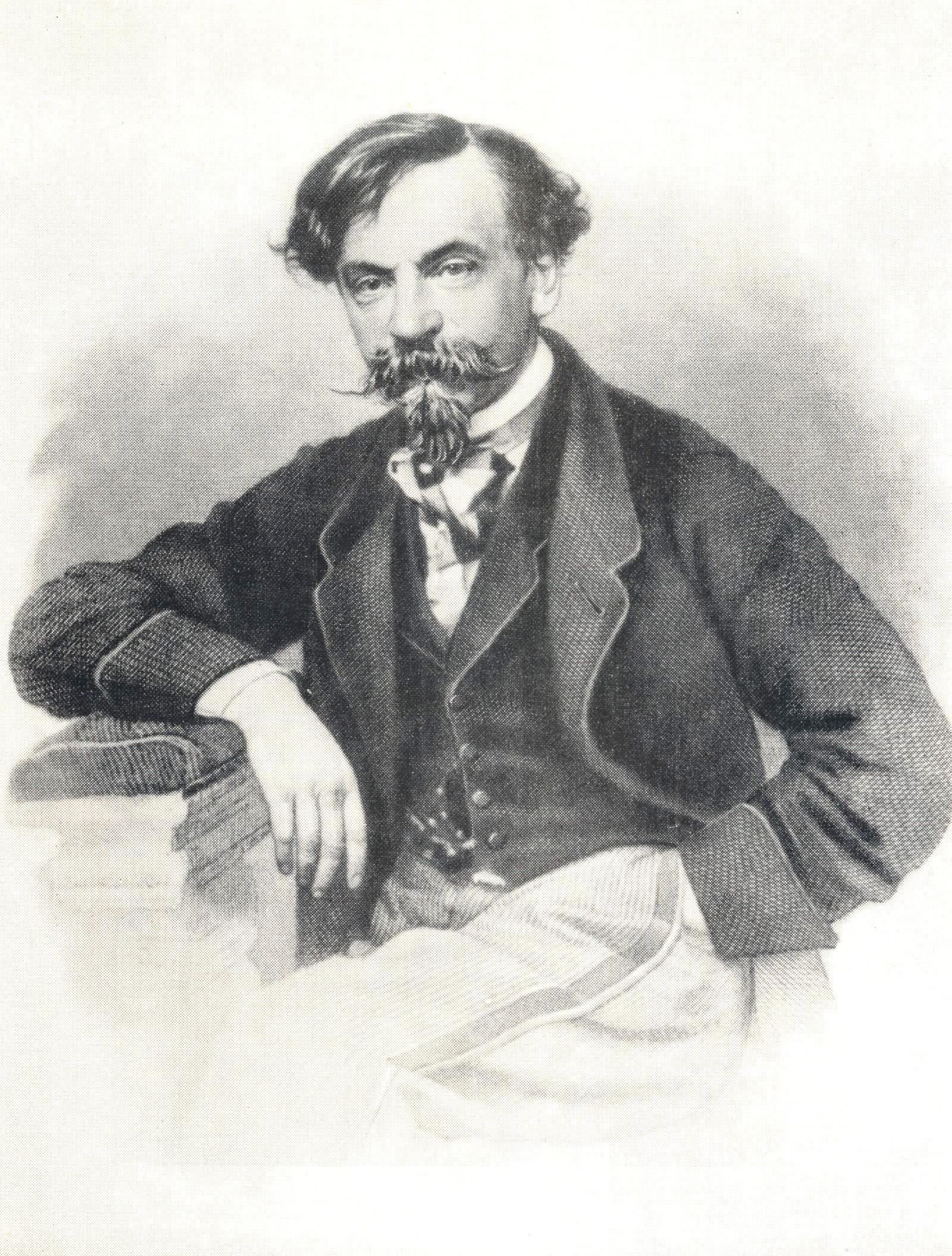
- Born: March 27, 1812; Saint Petersburg
- Died: March 2, 1862 (aged 49); Saint Petersburg
- Resting place: Literatorskiye Mostki, Saint Petersburg
- Spouse: Avdotya Panaeva (m. 1839)

Ivan Ivanovich Panaev (Russian: Ива́н Ива́нович Пана́ев; March 27, 1812 – March 2, 1862) was a Russian writer, literary critic, journalist and magazine publisher.

== Early life ==
Panaev was born into a gentry family in St Petersburg. He graduated from the Boarding School for the Nobility at Saint Petersburg State University in 1830. He began publishing his works in 1834. His first romantic novellas included The Bedroom of a Society Woman (1834, published 1835) and She Will Be Happy (1836). He married Avdotya Bryanskaya in 1837. Avdotya became a well-known writer and memoirist.

== Career ==
Panaev became acquainted with Vissarion Belinsky in 1839; their friendship significantly influenced Panaev's literary career. Between 1839 and 1846 his works were published in Otechestvennye Zapiski. They included the novellas The Onager (1841) and Actaeon (1842), the novel Mama's Boy (1845), essays, satires, and short stories. Panaev's satire The Literary Aphid (1843) was highly praised by Belinsky. He abandoned his civil service career in 1844, in order devote his full attention to literature. Panaev was introduced to Fyodor Dostoyevsky by Nikolay Nekrasov and Dmitry Grigorovich, and often met Dostoyevsky at meetings of the Belinsky circle. In 1845 Dostoyevsky read his first novel Poor Folk to a literary gathering organized by Panaev and his wife. Dostoyevsky was a frequent visitor to the important literary salon run by Avdotya Panaeva. Dostoyevsky stopped attending the salon after quarreling with Ivan Turgenev, a fellow visitor.

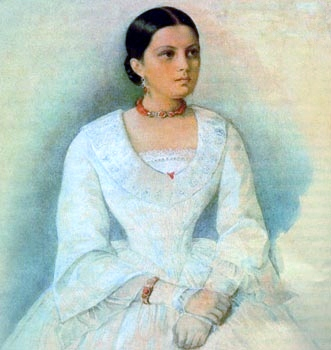
Portrait of Avdotya Panaeva by Kirill Gorbunov.

In 1847, together with Nekrasov, Panaev took over Sovremennik, making it into a popular literary magazine and a financial success. Between 1851 and 1861, under the pseudonym "The New Poet", he published his monthly surveys of journalism and of life in St Petersburg in Sovremennik. Other works by Panaev include the novel Lions in the Provinces (1852), the novella Relatives (1847), and the essay cycle Knowledge of Fops (1854–57). In the 1850s Panaev was one of the leading supporters of the emancipation of women. His Literary Reminiscences, written during the last years of his life, were published in 1861. This work contains portraits of literary figures, artists, musicians, and actors of the period from the 1820ss to the 1850s. Panaev's literary parodies, some written in collaboration with Nekrasov, were widely read.
