= Apollon Golovachyov =

Russian journalist and literary critic

- Аполлон Филиппович Головачёв
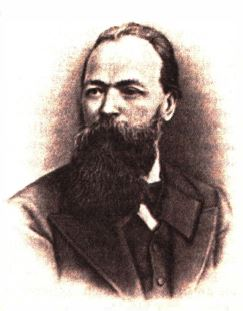
- Born: Apollon Filippovich Golovachyov; 17 July 1831; Domkino, Tver Governorate, Russian Empire
- Died: 27 October 1877 (aged 46); Saint Petersburg, Russian Empire
- Resting place: Literatorskiye Mostki, St. Petersburg
- Occupations: journalist, literary critic, publisher, editor

Apollon Filippovich Golovachyov (Russian: Аполло́н Фили́ппович Головачёв, 17 July 1831 — 27 October 1877) was a Russian journalist, literary critic, publicist, publisher and editor.

Having debuted as published author in 1860, the Moscow newspaper Nashe Vremya, he went on to contribute to Russkaya Rech, Russky Invalid, and, in particular, Sovremennik which in 1863—1865 he was a secretary of. He went on to co-edit Narodnaya Letopis with Yuliy Zhukovsky, and later worked as staff member for several magazines, including Vek, Birzhevyie Vedomosti, Detskoye Chteniye (edited by his brother Grigory Golovachyov) and Severny Vestnik. In 1865 he purchased the printing facilities and started to publish the works of Russian authors (among them Vasily Kurochkin), as well as translations, including those of John Stuart Mill, Charles Darwin and Pierre-Joseph Proudhon. In 1877, at the outset of the Russo-Turkish War, Golovachyov, now terminally ill, went to the frontline as a war correspondent for Severny Vestnik. He died of tuberculosis on 27 October 1877, in Saint Petersburg and was interred in Volkovo Cemetery, the Literatorskiye Mostki section.

In 1866 Golovachyov married Avdotya Panayeva. The novelist Yevdokiya Nagrodskaya (1866–1930) was their daughter.
