= Vasily Sleptsov =

Russian writer and social reformer (1836–1878)

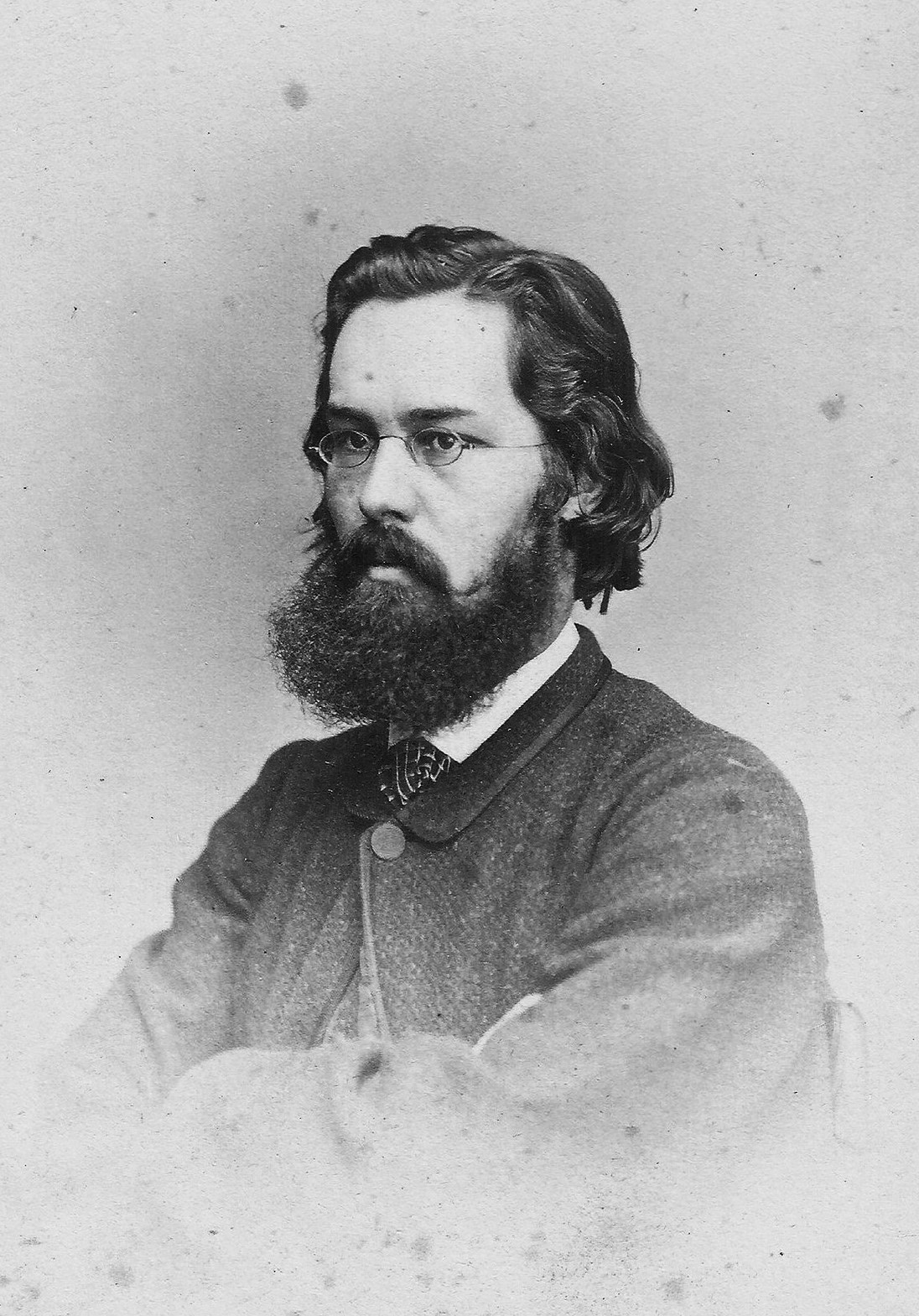
- Born: July 31, 1836; Voronezh, Russia
- Died: April 4, 1878 (aged 41); Serdobsk, Russia
- Occupations: Novelist, short story writer, playwright, journalist
- Writing career
- Period: 1861—1878
- Notable work: Hard Times

Vasily Alekseyevich Sleptsov (Russian: Васи́лий Алексе́евич Слепцо́в, July 31, 1836 – April 4, 1878), was a Russian writer, playwright, journalist and social reformer.

== Biography ==
Sleptsov was born in Voronezh into a noble family. His father Alexey Vasilyevich was a military man, his mother Josefina Adamovna, née Welbutovich-Paplonska, belonged to the Polish szlachta. He studied at the First Moscow Gymnasium and later, when the family moved to their county estate in Saratov Governorate, at the Penza Institute for Nobility. Sleptsov attended the medical school at Moscow University in 1855–56. He then went to Yaroslavl to try being an actor. He soon returned to Moscow, where he was in government service from 1857 to 1861–62.

In the early 1860s Sleptsov organized a women's commune in Saint Petersburg and set up a society for female translators. He wrote fiction for several magazines including Otechestvennye Zapiski, Russkaya Rech, and Sovremennik, where he published his novel Hard Times in 1865. Sleptsov's works were praised by Leo Tolstoy; especially his story "The Ward" (1863).

In 1866 he was arrested for political activities, and for his association with Dmitry Karakozov, a man who had attempted to assassinate Tsar Alexander II. Upon his release, he helped to create the magazine The Women's Herald. His works were widely read in the 1860s, but his popularity began to decline in the 1870s. The novel A Good Man was left unfinished at his death in 1878.

== English translations ==
- "Choir Practice", (story), from The Humor of Russia, Ethel Voynich/Sergey Stepnyak-Kravchinsky, Walter Scott Publishing, 1909. from Archive.org
- "The Ward", (story), from In the Depths, Raduga Publishers, Moscow, 1987.
- Hard Times: A Novel of Liberals and Radicals in 1860s Russia, transl. by M. R. Katz; with an introduction by W. C. Brumfield. University of Pittsburgh Press, 2016

== Bibliography ==
- Brumfield, William С. (2014), "Sleptsov Redivivus", Znanie. Ponimanie. Umenie, 11 (2), archived (PDF) from the original on 13 September 2014.
- Brumfield, William С. (2015), "Bazarov and Riazanov: The Romantic Archetype in Russian Literature", Informatsionnyi Gumanitarnyi Portal "Znanie. Ponimanie. Umenie" (3), archived from the original on 29 October 2015.
- Brumfield, William С. (2015), "Two Hamlets: Questioning Romanticism in Turgenev's Bazarov and Sleptsov's Riazanov" (PDF), Journal of Siberian Federal University. Humanities & Social Sciences, 8 (9): 1792–1802, doi:10.17516/1997-1370-2015-8-9-1792-1802, archived (PDF) from the original on 21 June 2017.
