= Aleksey Koltsov =

Russian poet

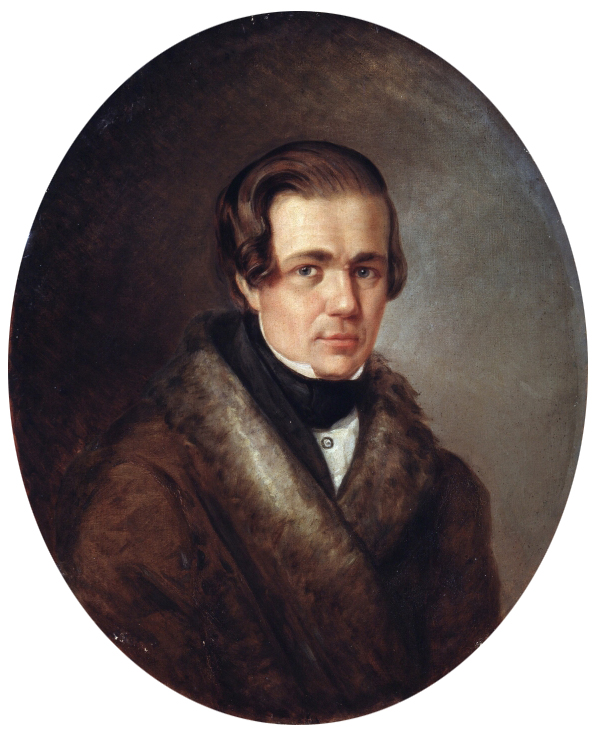
Portrait by Kirill Gorbunov

Aleksey Vasilievich Koltsov (Russian: Алексе́й Васи́льевич Кольцо́в; October 15, 1809 – October 29, 1842) was a Russian poet who has been called a Russian Burns. His poems, frequently placed in the mouth of women, stylize peasant-life songs and idealize agricultural labour. Koltsov earnestly collected Russian folklore which strongly influenced his poetry. He celebrated simple peasants, their work and their lives. Koltsov's works included The Song of the Ploughman (1831) and The Harvest (1835) with the latter describing the labourers' work, together with their trust in God's providence, Many of his poems were put to music by such composers as Dargomyzhsky, Mussorgsky, and Rimsky-Korsakov. In a letter dated 25th October 1891 in which Leo Tolstoy reflected on the literary influences during his earlier life, he referred to Koltsov's poems as having had a "great" influence.

== Biography ==
He was born in Voronezh as a son of a cattle merchant. Having studied for less than two years at a local school (1818–1820), Aleksey quit at the insistence of his father who wanted his help with his business. Koltsov moved, bought and sold cattle; and in the meantime, wrote poems secretly from his father.

The first serious introduction of his poetry occurred in 1831, when Nikolai Stankevich, a poet and philosopher from Moscow, published several poems in "Literaturnaya gazeta" (Literary newspaper) with a short introduction. In 1835, his first collection of poetry was published. Koltsov often traveled on business to St. Petersburg and Moscow, where he met Belinsky, who became his mentor, as well as Vasily Zhukovsky, Pyotr Vyazemsky, Vladimir Odoevsky, and Aleksandr Pushkin, who published one of Koltsov's poems in his journal "Sovremennik".

Koltsov's father constantly and cruelly controlled his life, suppressing Aleksey's creative writing and his personal life. Weakened by depression and a year-long tuberculosis, Koltsov died in 1842 at the age of 33. He was buried in Voronezh.
