= Yevdokiya Nagrodskaya =

Russian novelist

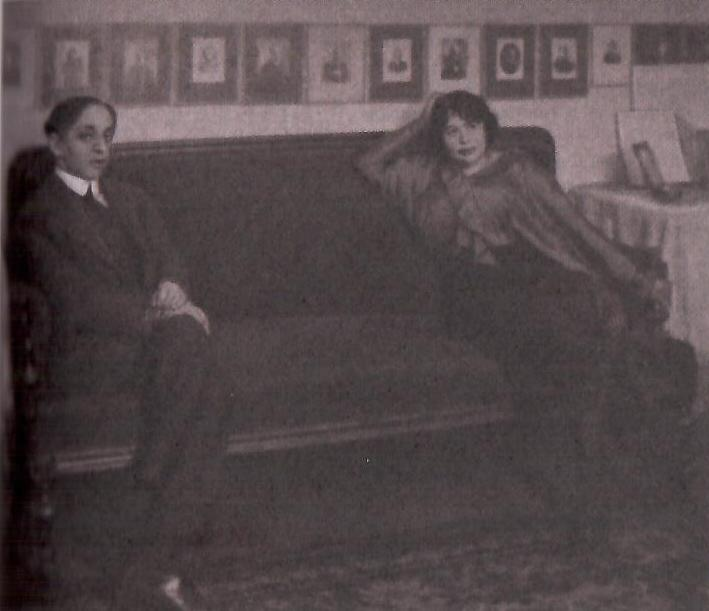
- Born: 1866
- Died: 1930 (aged 63–64)
- Occupation: Novelist
- Notable work: Novel - The Wrath of Dionysus

Yevdokiya Nagrodskaya (Russian: Евдокия Нагродская; 1866–1930), was a Russian novelist in fin-de-siècle Russia whose first novel was titled The Wrath of Dionysus. Her debut novel was published in 1910 and explored the theme of her perception of "sexual identity and gender roles" of men and women in Russia. It was very popular in pre-revolutionary Russia among the middle-class people and was controversial. The novel was so popular that it was reprinted 10 times and translated into French, Italian and German. It was also made into a silent movie with erotic content.

The Wrath of Dionysus was translated into English in 1997 at the initiative of Louise McReynolds, a professor of history, and Russian culture, at the University of Hawaii. It was published by Indiana University Press and co-won the Heldt Prize in 1998.

== Life ==
Yevdokiya Nagrodskaya was born as Evdokiia Apollonovna Golovacheva in Russia in 1866. Her mother was Avdotya Panaeva, a writer of fiction and memoirs who co-edited the journal Sovremennik (1848–63), and her father was Apollon Golovachev, a journalist.

She was later married and migrated to France after the publication of her novels. Later her novels were not popular in Russia.

Nagrodskaya died in 1930.

== The Wrath of Dionysus ==
In 1910, Nagrodskaya published her first novel, The Wrath of Dionysus. The book was described by scholar Laura Engelstein as "boulevard fiction" in The Keys to Happiness: Sex and the Search for Modernity in Fin-de-Siècle Russia. In Libertinage in Russian Culture and Literature, Alexei Lalo stated that "[Nagródskaia] may have felt the need to represent the continuum of heterosexual and homosexual love and shifting gender identity more completely and insightfully than her contemporaries Zinovieva-Annibal or Verbitskaya did" and described the novel as "a more modern—and modernizing—literary phenomenon that many diverse researchers ... have taken it to be."

The Wrath of Dionysus was highly popular and became a bestseller. After its success, she published more novels such as The Bronze Door, The River of Times, and The White Colonnade.

The Wrath of Dionysus was published in English in 1997 and was translated by Louise McReynolds, who said, "The Wrath of Dionysus is a rich blend of early cultural politics and explorations of sexual identity." Nagrodskaya presents in this novel, set in the Caucasus, a 20th-century middle-class Russia riddled with muddled conceptions about sex. Nagrodskaya showed a perception of gender difference by stating that effeminate men who show deep affection to their children are homosexual, and women who are masculine in nature with independent thinking are lesbian; but both derive sexual pleasure from each other.

The English edition of the novel was reviewed by the Midwest Book Review, which described it as an "outstanding edition," and by the Library Journal, who said that it was "highly recommended for collections of Slavic literature as well as popular fiction." Publishers Weekly wrote, "The themes of The Wrath of Dionysus sound so contemporary that it may surprise readers to find them in a Russian novel published more than 80 years ago." The Kirkus Review described the book as "well-known throughout Europe."

== Bibliography ==
- Nagrodskai︠a︡, E.; McReynolds, Louise (1997). The wrath of Dionysus: a novel. Indiana University Press. ISBN 978-0-253-33304-9.
