= National Pushkin Museum =

Literary museum in Saint Petersburg, Russia

Coordinates: 59.941235°N 30.320982°E

- Всероссийский музей А. С. Пушкина
- Established: 1953
- Location: located in Saint Petersburg, Russia.
- Collections: 200,000 artifacts, including memorabilia, books and works of art related to Pushkin

The National Pushkin Museum (Russian: Всероссийский музей А. С. Пушкина, romanized: Vsyerossiiskii muzei A. S. Pushkina, lit. 'All-Russian Museum of A. S. Pushkin') is a museum dedicated to the life and work of Russian poet Alexander Pushkin. It is located in Saint Petersburg, Russia. The museum was established in 1953.

== See also ==
- List of museums in Saint Petersburg
