= Mikhail Avdeev (writer) =

Russian novelist, playwright and publicist

Mikhail Vasilyevich Avdeev
- Михаил Васильевич Авдеев
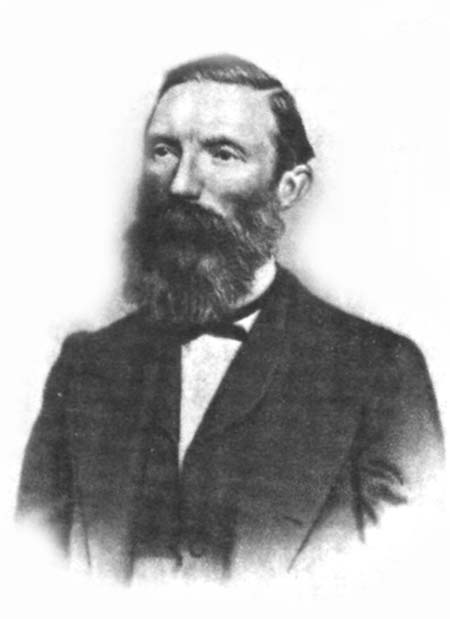
- Born: October 10, 1821; Orenburg, Russian Empire
- Died: February 13, 1876 (aged 54); Saint Petersburg, Russian Empire
- Writing career
- Genres: fiction, drama, memoirs
- Notable work: Tamarin trilogy (1849–1852)

Mikhail Vasilyevich Avdeev (Russian: Михаи́л Васи́льевич Авде́ев, October 10, 1821, Orenburg, Russian Empire – February 13, 1876, Saint Petersburg, Russian Empire) was a Russian novelist, playwright and publicist, best known for the Tamarin trilogy, published in 1849–1852 by Sovremennik.

== Biography ==
Mikhail Vasilyevich Avdeev was born on October 10 (September 21, old style), 1821, in the old Yaik Cossacks family in Orenburg. One of his private teaches was the Polish author and social activist Tomasz Zan, and it was to the latter's credit that the boy developed his passion for literature. In the late 1820s the family moved to Ufa where Mikhail studied in a gymnasium. In the mid-1830s he enrolled into the Saint Petersburg Institute of Railroad Engineers and, having graduated in 1842, went to work in Nizhny Novgorod.

=== Literary career ===
In 1849–1852 Sovremennik published three novels by Avdeev - Varenka, The Notes of Tamarin and Ivanov—later to become known as the Tamarin trilogy. The hero, Tamarin, was seen by the author as a development of the Pechorin character; another 'superfluous man', eager to put his worthy qualities and moral strength to a socially useful action and failing to find any. The trilogy was very popular and for the rest of the decade Russian critics used the "Tamarin" token name as a symbol of a certain social type. Encouraged by the trilogy's success, Avdeev retired from the service and settled in his Orenburg Governorate family estate to become a professional writer. His Letters of a Vacant Man from Petersburg to the Province appeared in Sovremennik in 1853.

In 1861 Avdeev returned to the state service, to work as a councilor in a local court specializing in land disputes, following the 1861 Land reform. In 1862 in poet Mikhail Mikhaylov's archives Avdeev's letters were found. He was arrested and deported to Penza. "Cautious as he might be, his enunciations are often quite liberal and are of a Hertzen-like nature," the Russian secret police report maintained.

In 1856 Avdeed was granted the permission to leave the country. Three years later he returned to Russia from France (where he became close to Ivan Turgenev) and in 1860 published his Underwater Rock novel, the idea of a 'free love' being its leitmotif. The novel was criticized for being schematic and 'cold'. "Lifelessness in the major feature of all Avdeev's works," critic Nikolai Strakhov opined. Even less successful with critics was his Between the Two Fires (1868) novel, featuring landlord Kamyshlintsev as a main character, whose occupation seemed to be "dreaming of big love and of some great cause to pursuit" and whom Mikhail Saltykov-Shchedrin defined as "the type of a Wanton Russian man".

Novelets Magdalene, The Motley Life and The Dried-Out Love (all 1870), dealing with married women's spiritual tribes and tribulations, established Avdeev as a "divorce suit specialist", according to Saltykov-Shchedrin. By this time the writer's popularity waned, yet critics from the liberal camp were eager to give him credit for "helping to slacken these crashing fetters of a formalist morality and introduce the humane approach to the stale atmosphere of the society's notions about canons of family life," as Alexander Skabichevsky has put it. Avdeev's 1874 collection of essays Our Society as Shown in Heroes and Heroines of the 1820–1879 Russian Literature followed the Dobrolyubov's style of analytical social criticism, yet failed to produce the similar response. Avdeev wrote two plays, The Philistine Family and The Sixth Sense; the latter has been produced by the Alexandrinsky Theatre but failed to cause any stir.

Mikhail Avdeev died on February 13 (February 1, o.s.), 1876, in Saint Petersburg. His last books, My Times in 1830s and In the Forties were published posthumously.

== Legacy ==
Avdeev's best-known work, the Tamarin trilogy, highlighting the tragedy of a gifted but socially inert man, was obviously lacking in originality, borrowing heavily from Mikhail Lermontov's A Hero of Our Time, but also from Alexander Pushkin's Evgeny Onegin and Alexander Druzhinin's Polinka Zachs. "Finely written, his novels lack in freshness and are sewn-up with well-worn fragments, while novelets are not suited at all for our age which sometimes forgives roughness of form, but never - the lack of ideas," wrote Nikolai Chernyshevsky, who saw the Tamarin character as a parody on that of Pechorin, by no means the development of it.

And yet, according to the Russian Literary Dictionary, "both readers and critics of the time admired Avdeev for his gift of storytelling, coupled with willingness to respond eagerly to any trendy theme or social issue." "What made him popular was his liberal, humane attitude and the agility with which he was throwing himself headfast into every new social current," Alexander Skabichevsky wrote.

== Selected bibliography ==
=== Fiction ===
- Varenka/The Notes of Tamarin/Ivanov - the Tamarin trilogy (1849–1852, three novels)
- Letters of a Vacant Man to the Province About Life in Petersburg (Pisma 'pustovo tcheloveka' v provintsiyu o peterburgskoy zhizni, 1853, novelet).
- Underwater Rock (Podvodny kamen, 1860, novel)
- Between the Two Fires (Mezhdu dvukh ognei, 1868, novel)
- Magdalene (1870, novelet)
- The Motley Life (Pyostrenkaya zhizn, 1870, novelet)
- The Dried Out Love (Sukhaya lyubov, 1870, novelet)
- In the Forties (V sorokovykh godakh, 1876, novel)

=== Non-fiction ===
- Our Society as Shown in Heroes and Heroines of the 1820–1879 Russian Literature (Nashe obshchestvo [1820–1870] v geroyakh i geroinyakh russkoi literatury, 1874, essay collection)
- My Times in 1830s (Moi vremena v 30-kh godakh, 1876, memoirs)

=== Plays ===
- The Philistine Family (Meshchanskaya semya, 1868)
- The Sixth Sense (Shestoye tchuvstvo)
