= The Landlady (novella) =

1847 novella by Fyodor Dostoyevsky

- Author: Fyodor Dostoevsky
- Original title: Хозяйка (Khozayka)
- Language: Russian
- Genre: Gothic, fantasy
- Publisher: Notes of the Fatherland
- Publication date: 1847
- Publication place: Russia
- Preceded by: "Novel in Nine Letters"
- Followed by: "The Jealous Husband"

The Landlady (Russian: Хозяйка, romanized: Khozayka) is a novella by Russian author Fyodor Dostoevsky, written and published in 1847. Set in Saint Petersburg, it tells of an abstracted young man, Vasily Mikhailovich Ordynov, and his obsessive love for Katerina, the wife of a dismal husband whom Ordynov perceives as a malignant fortune-teller or mystic. The story has echoes of Russian folklore and may contain autobiographical references. In its time The Landlady had a mixed reception, more recently being seen as perhaps unique in Dostoevsky's oeuvre. The first part of the novella was published in October 1847 in Notes of the Fatherland, the second part in November that year.

== Plot ==
After the reclusive and bookish scholar Vasily Ordynov is compelled to leave his apartment he wanders aimlessly through Saint Petersburg, contemplating his despair over a loveless life, his childhood and his future. Through this distraction he finds himself within a church, where he notices an old man, Ilia Murin, with his young wife, Katerina. His fascination for the couple, particularly Katerina, causes him to contrive further encounters, with the intention of securing a lodging at their home. He becomes their house guest. The gloomy Murin is a perceived Old Believer, with powers of clairvoyance that have perturbed his neighbours and the local police, and which appear to control his wife. Katerina implies that Murin was her mother's lover, that she might be Murin's biological daughter, and that the pair ran-off together after he killed her father. There is an unresolved suggestion that Murin caused the death of Katerina's fiancé during their escape.

Ordynov develops a passion for Katerina, which she reciprocates after nursing him through delirium. While in delirium Ordynov, in dream or reality, spies on Murin who has taken to his bed through illness and is recounting tales to Katerina – he rushes into Murin's room; Murin's attempt to shoot Ordynov with a gun, misses. Ordynov tries to convince Katerina of her need to detach herself from Murin physically and psychologically, and believes he has overcome her reluctance to do so when he hears her sing a song of love and freedom. Katerina offers wine to Ordynov and Murin as she considers her choice. Murin uses the language of prediction and psychology to show any choice as futile, as Katerina is predestined by her sex to be a captive of a master and her own grief. Ordynov now fully believes that Murin is a sorcerer and that Katerina is his slave, as she herself believes. Using Murin's argument, he offers to buy Katerina, to effect her liberation. Murin indicates a veiled threat that the price would be bloodshed for both buyer and goods. Fearing a lost cause, Ordynov intends to kill Murin, but fails as a knife falls from his hand and as Katerina falls at her husband's feet.

Orynov, overwhelmed, leaves his lodging with Murin. He resumes his reclusive life, but not his studies, his passion for learning having been lost. He lives then on as a lonely and bitter man, without his old passions to drive him, often struck with thoughts of Katerina.

When one day he meets an old friend in the street, he is informed that Murin and Katerina have left St. Petersburg.

== Background ==
In October 1846 Dostoevsky wrote to his brother Mikhail that his short story Mr. Prokharchin was well-received, and that he was continuing to work on Saved Sidewhiskers for Vissarion Belinsky. The idea for The Landlady already existed at that point, and three days later he again wrote to Mikhail saying that the proposed Saved Sidewhiskers would be shelved as he wanted to introduce a new style, and that "more original, lively and bright thoughts were asking to be put on paper". He later pointed out the favourable similarities between the progress of The Landlady and that of his first novel, Poor Folk.

On 26 November 1846 Dostoevsky announced that he had ended his affiliation with Nekrasov and Panaev's journal The Contemporary, to join Andrey Krayevsky's Notes of the Fatherland. He also ended his association with Belinsky's literary circle after a dispute in early 1846 – subsequently Belinsky left Notes of the Fatherland to write for The Contemporary. Krayevsky published most of Dostoevsky's pre-prison stories in 1846, except A Novel in Nine Letters, issued in The Contemporary, and Polzunkov, printed in The Illustrated Almanach. In early 1847 Dostoevsky noted in a letter to his brother that work on The Landlady had begun – on 9 September 1847 it was finalized. According to Dostoevsky's wishes the first part was published in October and the second part the following month.

== Themes and style ==
According to Neuhäuser, The Landlady incorporates themes found in artistic fairy tales, which, unlike typical folk tales, are written by a particular person, and not collected from hearsay. According to Professor S. Gibian, The Landlady is a "recreation of folktale diction and imagery" and "its plot is based on the three folklore motifs, man–woman dominance, the incestuous father–daughter relationship, and Volga outlaw tales."

The abstracted chief protagonist, Ordynov, is a prototype of future characters that would appear in "White Nights" and Netochka Nezvanova. C. E. Passage felt that the work was influenced by Gogol's Taras Bulba and A Terrible Vengeance, Odoevsky's Improvizator, Hoffmann's Die Elixiere des Teufels, Der Magnetiseur, Der unheimliche Gast, Der Sandmann and Der Artushof. In Dostoevsky: The Adapter, Passage argues that the "truth of the matter is that Dostoevsky was again compounding story elements as in the case of The Double."

Alfred Bem postulates in Dramatizatsiia breda that The Landlady incorporates autobiographical elements. Influenced by Freud's psychoanalysis, he argued that Ordynov's familial relationship with Katerina and Murin was similar to Dostoevsky's own, and found reflections of the writer's affair with Avdotya Panayeva, whom he met within her husband's political circle. Bem states that tiring quarrels between circle members Nikolay Nekrasov and Ivan Turgenev worsened Dostoevsky's health, which was already unstable due to stress. Elements of Gothic literature were also detected in the story's dark atmosphere, and the strange character of the relationship between Katerina and Ordynov. Valery Kirpotin believes that the novella discusses good and evil. The critic Stanisław Mackiewicz felt that he had found the key to understanding its symbolic content and the reason for Belinsky's animosity: "I am of the belief that the young person represents the Russian intelligence, and the woman with the expressive name 'The Landlady' the Russian folk, while the haunted fortuneteller echoes the religious beliefs of that folk and especially the schismatic Old Believers."

Sophie Ollivier says that the novella tries to "penetrate into the essence of the historical consciousness of the Russian people, of the Russian faith". Robert Mann believes that Murin is based on the Prophet Elijah, and that Ordynov has a similar religiosity to several literary characters in the 1860s and 1870s. Murin could also be a precursor of The Grand Inquisitor from The Brothers Karamazov.

== Reception ==
The Landlady received mixed reception. Dostoevsky was criticized for plagiarizing other works, specifically E.T.A. Hoffmann's Erscheinungen. Vissarion Belinsky called the novella "terrible rubbish" and further commented that he "had tried to reconcile Marlinsky to Hoffmann, adding a bit of humour after the latest fashion, and covering the whole with a thick veneer of "narodnost" [Russian cultural tradition]." Belinsky saw the work as resembling the stories of Tit Kosmokratov (Vladimir Titov), that it has "not a single simple and lively word or phrase" and that "everything is affected, strained, on stilts, artificial and false." Recent reception has been more positive than Dostoevsky's contemporary. Kenneth A. Lantz stated that it is "unique among Dostoyevsky's works in its extreme melodrama, eeriness and general obscurity."

== Bibliography ==
- Frank, Joseph (2009). Dostoevsky: A Writer in His Time. Vol. 1–5. Princeton University Press. ISBN 978-0-691-12819-1.
- Institute of Russian Literature (The Pushkin House) (ed.). Complete Works in Thirty Volumes (полное собрание сочинений в тридцати томах) (in Russian). Nauka.
- Johnson, Brain R. (2008). The Art of Dostoevsky's Falling Sickness. ISBN 9780549804567.
- Kjetsaa, Geir (1989). A Writer's Life. Fawcett Columbine. ISBN 9780449903346.
- Lantz, Kenneth A. (2004). The Dostoevsky Encyclopedia. Westport, Connecticut: Greenwood Publishing Group. ISBN 978-0-3133-0384-5.
- Mochulsky, Konstantin (1967) [1967]. Dostoevsky: His Life and Work. Minihan, Michael A. (translator). Princeton University Press. ISBN 978-0-691-01299-5.
- Terras, Victor (1998). Reading Dostoevsky. University of Wisconsin Press. ISBN 978-0-2991-6054-8.
