= Stepan Yanovsky =

Russian Fyodor Dostoyevsky scholar (1815–1897)

Stepan Dmitrievich Yanovsky (Russian: Степа́н Дми́триевич Яно́вский; 1815 – 13 July 1897, Switzerland) was a family doctor of Fyodor Dostoyevsky. He watched after the writer's health from 1846 to 1849. He was also an author of memoirs about Dostoevsky ("The Russian Messenger" magazine, 1885, №176). Some features of Yanovsky and some family events from his life were reflected in the image of Dostoevsky's character Pavel Pavlovich Trusotsky ("The Eternal Husband").

== Biography ==
Stepan Yanovsky graduated from Moscow department (Russian: Московская медико-хирургическая академия) of S. M. Kirov Military Medical Academy. In the beginning of his career, he served as a doctor in Preobrazhensky Regiment (enlisted in 1837) and as a doctor and a lecturer of Natural history in Saint Petersburg State Forest Technical University (Russian: Санкт-Петербургский государственный лесотехнический университет). In the middle of 1840th, having received a position in the department of state-owned medical warehouses of The Ministry of Internal Affairs (Russian: Министерство внутренних дел), Yanovsky opened a private medical practice that gave him access to the world of St. Petersburg's contemporary writers. In 1855, Stepan Dmitrievich married Alexandra Ivanovna Shubert (Russian: Алекса́ндра Ива́новна Шу́берт-Яно́вская), an actress of the Alexandrinsky Theatre. The marriage lasted 8 years. Yanovsky retired in 1871, immigrated to Switzerland 6 years after, where he died in 1897.

== Relationship with Dostoevsky ==
In the spring of 1846, Yanovsky was contacted by a student, Vladimir Maikov (Russian: Влади́мир Ма́йков) who asked him to provide a consultation for his close friend, then 24 year old Fyodor Dostoevsky, who had complaints about dizziness and insomnia. The first meeting of the doctor and the author of the just-released "Poor Folk" and "The Double" occurred at the end of May. Their relationship became friendly, and they met weekly (at times daily) over the next 3 years, until Dostoevsky's arrest and exile for his part in the Petrashevsky Circle. The treatment that Yanovsky provided was intended to eliminate Dostoevsky's periodical hallucinations and symptoms of "head dizziness". The doctor argued that Dostoevsky, though he was afraid of paralysis, must have felt himself to be a healthy man. The treatment included a special diet and a decoction made from the roots of Smilax ornata.

Dostoevsky and Yanovsky's discussions were not limited to medical matters: they discussed literature, music, and daily events. Stepan Dmitrievich knew about the family and financial problems of his patient. The doctor was one of the first people to hear about Dostoevsky's arrest, from Michail Michailovich Dostoevsky who visited him in the early morning of 23 April 1849. He informed Yanovsky that Fyodor Mikhailovich was detained in the Third Section of His Imperial Majesty's Own Chancellery. Later, in 1859, when Dostoevsky was allowed to live in Tver, Yanovsky (according to his memoirs) was one of the first friends who visited him in that town.

Some letters that Yanovsky and Dostoevsky sent to each other are preserved to this day. In the spring of 1868, after The Idiot had been published, Yanovsky wrote to the author about its reception. "In the club, in small saloons, in railway carriages... everywhere I can hear only 'Have you read Dostoevsky's last novel?'" In 1872, Dostoevsky wrote to Yanovsky a letter in which he expressed his gratitude to the doctor, the friend of his youth: "You are one of the unforgettable people, one of those who echoed sharply in my life... Because you are a benefactor, you loved me and spent your time with me, with the one who had a soul illness (now I realize this), before my trip to Siberia, where I was cured... Sincerely yours till death..."

== Family life ==
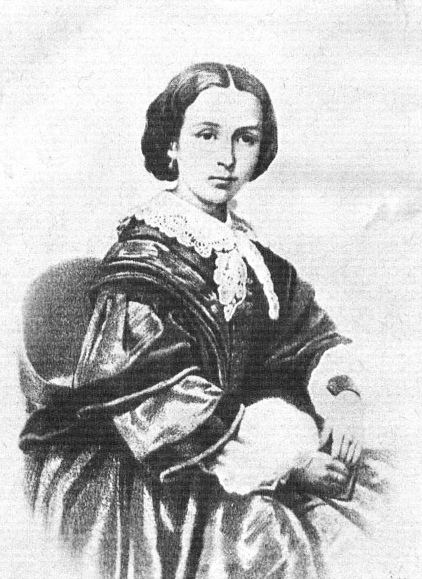
Alexandra Ivanovna Shubert

In 1855, Stepan Dmitrievich married an actress, Alexandra Ivanovna Shubert (Russian: Алекса́ндра Ива́новна Шу́берт-Яно́вская). Dostoevsky felt sympathy towards her: he expressed regret about the lack of worthy roles for her, and promised to write a single-act comedy exclusively for her. When the relationship between Stepan Dmitrievich and Alexandra Ivanovna began to fall apart in 1860, Dostoevsky supported Alexandra Ivanovna's decision to move from St. Petersburg to Moscow and took her side in the conflict. "Seems he (Yanovsky) is absolutely certain that we write to each other all the time, that you follow all my advice... I think he is a little bit jealous, perhaps, he thinks I'm in love with you." wrote Dostoevsky to Alexandra Ivanovna in a letter.

Aleksey Pleshcheyev, a poet who also knew details about the conflict between the doctor and his wife, supposed that Stepan Dmitrievich was the one responsible for the conflict. "I reckon, it must be torturously boring to live with Yanovsky — to listen to the same phrases for one's whole life — as if one had received a life sentence of eating nothing but strawberry jam!"

The couple divorced in 1863. Their relationship was reflected in Dostoevsky's "The Eternal Husband" (1870). Researchers suggest that Dostoevsky put some of Yanovsky's characteristics, such as suspicion, hypercriticism, and jealousy, into the character of Pavel Pavlovich Trusotsky, a person whose sole capability was being a husband. After "The Eternal Husband" had been published, Apollon Maykov told Dostoevsky that he "instantly recognized Yanovsky and his character".

== Memoirs about Dostoevsky ==
After Dostoevsky's death, Yankovsky published two memoirs about the writer.

The first one was published as an article, "Dostoevsky's illness", in the newspaper Novoye Vremya (1881, № 1793). It was structured as a letter to Apollon Maykov and contained Yanovsky's testimonies that Dostoevsky had been suffering from epilepsy for at least 3 years prior to his departure to Siberia, though it was a mild phase and was successfully handled by medication.

The next time Yanovsky wrote about Dostoevsky was an article in "The Russian Messenger" (1885, №176), which contained more details. He wrote about the writer's examinations and treatments, about their interpersonal relationships and "mutual trust", about Dostoevsky's preferences in literature. He reminisced that the writer was able to quote complete chapters from the books of Pushkin and Gogol, how he valued "A Sportsman's Sketches" of Turgenev, that he knew "Oblomov's Dream", from the novel of Goncharov, by heart. Prominent Dostoevsky researcher Ludmila Saraskina (Russian: Людми́ла Ива́новна Сара́скина) notes that Yanovsky's portrait of the doctor's friend might have been a little embellished, as Dostoevsky was pictured as a virtuous young man who didn't like wine, playing cards, or "chasing skirts".
