= Dostoevsky's Pushkin Speech =

1880 speech by Fyodor Dostoyevsky

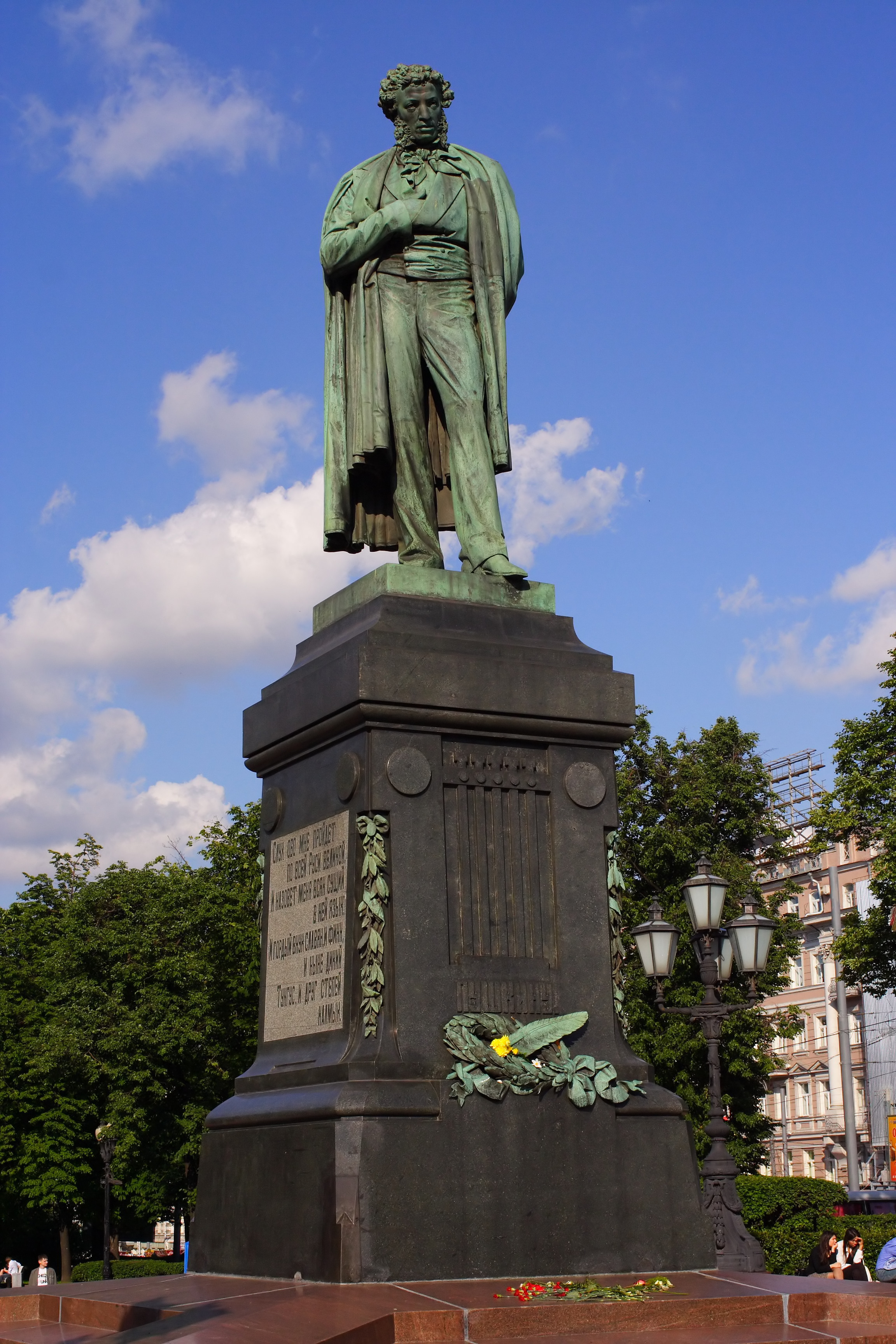
- Pushkin Monument in Moscow
- Location: Moscow
- Participants: Fyodor Mikhailovich Dostoyevsky

"Dostoyevsky's Pushkin Speech" was a speech delivered by Fyodor Dostoyevsky in honour of the Russian poet Alexander Pushkin on 20 June [O.S. 8 June] 1880 at the unveiling of the Pushkin Monument in Moscow. The speech is considered a crowning achievement of his final years and elevated him to the rank of a prophet while cementing his stature further as the greatest contemporary Russian writer.

The Pushkin Speech, which Dostoyevsky gave less than a year before his death, was delivered at the Strastnaya Square after a two-hour religious service at the monastery across the street. The address praised Pushkin as a beloved poet, a prophet, and the embodiment of Russia's national ideals. There are some who note that the speech was not really about Pushkin but about Russia, and also Dostoyevsky himself.
