= The Peasant Marey =

- Short story by Fyodor Dostoyevsky
- Original title: Мужик Марей (Muzhik Marey)
- Translator: Constance Garnett; David Magarshack; Roger Cockrell et al.
- Language: Russian
- Genre: Short story

Publication
- Publication date: 1876

"The Peasant Marey" (Russian: Мужик Марей Muzhik Marey), written in 1876, is both the "best-known autobiographical account" from the Writer's Diary of Fyodor Dostoevsky, and a frequently anthologized work of fiction. This "double encoding" arises from its framing as both short story, narrated by the fictional prisoner Goryanchikov from The House of the Dead, and as reminiscences of Dostoevsky himself, as a way to evade censorship.

"The Peasant Marey" is preoccupied mainly with a childhood memory, when the speaker was nine and living with his father in Tula province. The boy is frightened by rumors of a wolf prowling the countryside, and finds refuge with one of his father's serfs, Marey. Recollected 20 years later, the incident takes on the significance of an allegory or myth.

== Plot summary ==
The story opens around the holiday season of Easter, with the narrator wandering the prison camp. After a Polish political prisoner utters his hatred for the low bred convicts (both the Pole and the narrator are nobles), the narrator heads back to the bunks to rest. As he lies in his bed, he vividly recalls a memory from his early childhood. While playing near a birch wood, he had heard the shout "Wolf! Wolf!" Panicked, he runs away from the wood, finally coming across the peasant Marey. Marey comforts the boy, blessing him and reassuring him that there is no wolf. The boy is mollified by the peasant's genuine concern and benevolent nature, and eventually returns to playing.

The narrator returns from his memory to prison, reminded of the Russian peasantry's deeper wisdom despite their apparent lack of refinement, and laments that the Polish prisoner has never seen this cultured side. Still, he is sad to imagine that the drunken convict might be the same Marey he had encountered earlier.
