= Vremya (magazine) =

Russian magazine published by Fyodor Dostoevsky

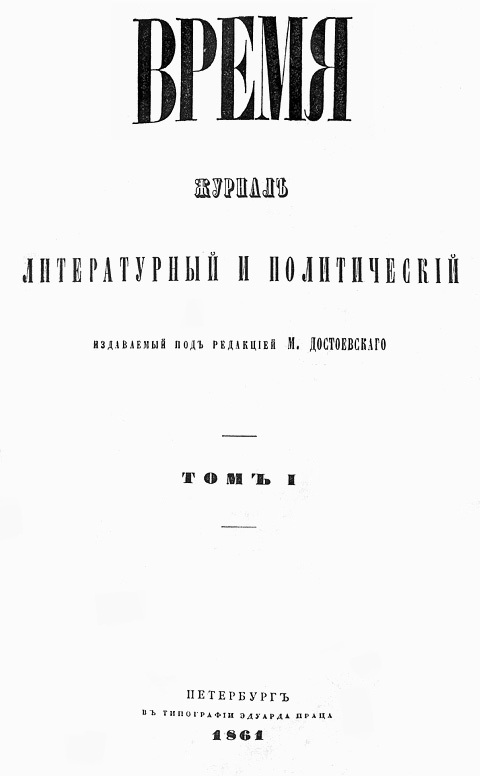
- First edition title page, 1861.
- Official editor: Mikhail Dostoyevsky
- Frequency: Monthly
- First issue: March 1861
- Final issue: 1863
- Country: Russian Empire
- Based in: St. Petersburg
- Language: Russian

Vremya (Russian: Вре́мя) (English: Time) was a monthly magazine published by Fyodor Dostoevsky under the editorship of his brother Mikhail Dostoevsky. Due to his status as a former convict, Fyodor himself was unable to be the official editor.

== Publication history ==
The magazine began publication in March 1861. Dostoevsky's novel The House of the Dead was first published in Vremya. The monthly installments of The House of the Dead brought considerable popularity and financial success to the magazine.

Three of Edgar Allan Poe's short stories, "The Tell-Tale Heart", "The Black Cat", and "The Devil in the Belfry", were given their first Russian language publication in Vremya. In the same issue, Dostoevsky anonymously published an autobiographical story, "St. Petersburg Dreams in Verse and Prose," that mimicked some elements of Poe's style. In his preface to Poe's stories, however, Dostoevsky suggested that Poe's poetry lacked the idealistic purity and beauty he found in the poetry of German romantic E. T. A. Hoffmann.

Several of Fyodor Dostoevsky's other works were published in Vremya, including Humiliated and Insulted, A Nasty Story, and Winter Notes on Summer Impressions.

The magazine was banned by the government in May 1863 because of an article by Nikolay Strakhov concerning Russian/Polish problems, including the recent January Uprising.
