= A Writer's Diary =

Book by Fyodor Dostoevsky

- English translation of A Writer's Diary
- Author: Fyodor Dostoevsky
- Original title: Дневник писателя (Dnevnik pisatelya)
- Translator: Kenneth Lantz
- Language: English (translated from Russian)
- Published: Northwestern University Press, 1993-1994, translation of works originally written 1873-1881
- Publication place: Russia
- Pages: 1455 pages in two volumes
- ISBN: 9780810110076 ISBN 9780810111011 (English translation)
- OCLC: 25370331

A Writer's Diary (Russian: Дневник писателя, romanized: Dnevnik pisatelya) is a collection of non-fiction and fictional writings by Fyodor Dostoevsky. Taken from pieces written for a periodical which he both founded and produced, it is normally published in two volumes: the first covering those articles published in the years 1873 and 1876, the second covering those published in the years 1877, 1880 and 1881.

== Diary articles ==
The English titles of the following list of works are extracted from Kenneth Lantz's two-volume translations.

List of essays and articles which appeared in A Writer's Diary
Title	Date	Ch.	#
"Introduction"	1873	–	–
"Old People"	1873	–	–
"Environment"	1873	–	–
"Something Personal"	1873	–	–
"Vlas"	1873	–	–
"Bobok (Notes of a Certain Person)"	1873	–	–
"A Troubled Countenance"	1873	–	–
"A Half-Letter from 'A Certain Person'"	1873	–	–
"Apropos of the Exhibition"	1873	–	–
"An Impersonator"	1873	–	–
"Dreams and Musings"	1873	–	–
"Apropos of a New Play"	1873	–	–
"Little Pictures"	1873	–	–
"To a Teacher"	1873	–	–
"Something about Lying"	1873	–	–
"One of Today's Falsehoods"	1873	–	–
"In Place of a Foreword. On the Great and Small Bears, on Great Goethe's Prayer, and, Generally, on Bad Habits"	January 1876	I	1
"A Future Novel". Another 'Accidental Family'"	January 1876	I	2
"The Christmas Party at the Artists' Club. Children Who Think and Who Are Helped Along. A 'Gluttonous Boy.' 'Oui' Girls. Jostling Raw Youths. A Moscow Captain in a Hurry"	January 1876	I	3
"The Golden Age in Your Pocket"	January 1876	I	4
"The Boy with His Hand Out"	January 1876	II	1
"The Beggar Boy at Christ's Christmas Tree"	January 1876	II	2
"A Colony of Young Offenders. Dark Individuals. The Transformation of Blemished Souls into Immaculate Ones. Measures Acknowledged as Most Expedient Thereto. Little and Bold Friends of Mankind"	January 1876	II	3
"The Russian Society for the Protection of Animals. The Government Courier. Demon-Vodka. The Itch for Debauch and Vorobev. From the End or from the Beginning?"	January 1876	III	1
"Spiritualism. Something about Devils. The Extraordinary Cleverness of Devils, If Only These Are Devils"	January 1876	III	2
"A Word Apropos of My Biography"	January 1876	III	3
"A Turkish Proverb"	January 1876	III	4
"On the Fact That We Are All Good People. How Russian Society Resembles Marshal McMahon"	February 1876	I	1
"On Love of the People. An Essential Contract with the People"	February 1876	I	2
"The Peasant Marey"	February 1876	I	3
"Apropos of the Kroneberg Case"	February 1876	II	1
"Something on Lawyer in General. My Naive and Hasty Assumptions. Something on Talented People in General and in Particular"	February 1876	II	2
"Mr. Spasovich's Speech. Clever Tactics"	February 1876	II	3
"The Berries"	February 1876	II	4
"The Pillars of Hercules"	February 1876	II	5
"The Family and Our Sacred Ideals. A Concluding Note about a Certain Modern School"	February 1876	II	6
"How True Is the Notion That 'The Ideals May Be Base So Long As The Reality Is Good'?"	March 1876	I	1
"A Hundred-Year-Old Woman"	March 1876	I	2
"Dissociation"	March 1876	I	3
"Musings about Europe"	March 1876	I	4
"An Expired Force and the Forces of the Future"	March 1876	I	5
"Don Carlos and Sir Watkin. More Signs of 'The Beginning of the End'"	March 1876	II	1
"Lord Radstock"	March 1876	II	2
"A Word or Two about the Report of the Scholarly Commission on Spiritualistic Phenomena"	March 1876	II	3
"Isolated Phenomena"	March 1876	II	4
"On Yuri Samarin"	March 1876	II	5
"The Ideals of a Stagnant, Vegetative Life. Kulaks and Bloodsuckers. Superior People Who Drive Russia Forward"	April 1876	I	1
"Minor Cultural Types. Damaged People"	April 1876	I	2
"Confusion and Inaccuracy in the Points at Issue"	April 1876	I	3
"The Beneficent Swiss Who Liberates a Russian Peasant"	April 1876	I	4
"Something on Political Questions"	April 1876	II	1
"A Paradoxicalist"	April 1876	II	2
"Just a Bit More Spiritualism"	April 1876	II	3
"On Behalf of One Deceased"	April 1876	II	4
"From a Private Letter"	May 1876	I	1
"A New Regional Voice"	May 1876	I	2
"The Court and Mrs. Kairova"	May 1876	I	3
"The Defense Attorney and Kairova"	May 1876	I	4
"The Defense Attorney and Velikanova"	May 1876	I	5
"Something about a Certain Building. Some Appropriate Thoughts"	May 1876	II	1
"One Inappropriate Thought"	May 1876	II	2
"A Democratic Spirit, for Certain. Women"	May 1876	II	3
"The Death of George Sand"	June 1876	I	1
"A Few Words about George Sand"	June 1876	I	2
"My Paradox"	June 1876	II	1
"Deduction from My Paradox"	June 1876	II	2
"The Eastern Question"	June 1876	II	3
"The Utopian Conception of History"	June 1876	II	4
"About Women Again"	June 1876	II	5
"Going Abroad. Something about Russians in Railway Carriages"	July / August 1876	I	1
"Something on Petersburg Baden-Badenism"	July / August 1876	I	2
"On the Pugnacity of the Germans"	July / August 1876	I	3
"The Very Last Word of Civilization"	July / August 1876	I	4
"Idealist-Cynics"	July / August 1876	II	1
"Should One Be Ashamed of Being an Idealist?"	July / August 1876	II	2
"The Germans and Labor. Inexplicable Tricks. On Wit"	July / August 1876	II	3
"Russian or French?"	July / August 1876	III	1
"What Language Should a Future Person of Consequence Speak?"	July / August 1876	III	2
"What Effects the Cure When Taking the Waters: The Water or the Bon Ton?"	July / August 1876	IV	1
"One on Whom Modern Woman Has Shown Favor"	July / August 1876	IV	2
"Children's Secrets"	July / August 1876	IV	3
"The Land and Children"	July / August 1876	IV	4
"An Odd Summer for Russia"	July / August 1876	IV	5
"Postscript"	July / August 1876	IV	6
"Piccola Bestia"	September 1876	I	1
"Words, Words, Words!"	September 1876	I	2
"Schemes and More Schemes"	September 1876	I	3
"Dressing Gowns and Soup"	September 1876	I	4
"Outmoded People"	September 1876	II	1
"Kifomokievism"	September 1876	II	2
"Continuation of the Preceding"	September 1876	II	3
"Fears and Apprehensions"	September 1876	II	4
"Postscript"	September 1876	II	5
"A Case That Is Not as Simple as It Seems"	October 1876	I	1
"A Few Remarks about Simplicity and Simplification"	October 1876	I	2
"Two Suicides"	October 1876	I	3
"The Sentence"	October 1876	I	4
"A New Phase in the Eastern Question"	October 1876	II	1
"Cherniaev"	October 1876	II	2
"The Best People"	October 1876	II	3
"On the Same Topic"	October 1876	II	4
"The Meek One"	November 1876	–	–
"Author's Introduction"	November 1876	–	–
"Who Was I and Who Was She?"	November 1876	I	1
"A Proposal of Marriage"	November 1876	I	2
"The Noblest of Man, but I Don't Believe It Myself"	November 1876	I	3
"Plans and More Plans"	November 1876	I	4
"The Meek One Rebels"	November 1876	I	5
"A Dreadful Recollection"	November 1876	I	6
"A Dream of Pride"	November 1876	II	1
"Suddenly the Shroud Fell Away"	November 1876	II	2
"I Understand All Too Well"	November 1876	II	3
"I Was Only Five Minutes Late"	November 1876	II	4
"More about a Case That Is Not as Simple as It Seems"	December 1876	I	1
"A Belated Moral"	December 1876	I	2
"Unsubstantiated Statements"	December 1876	I	3
"A Few Words about Young People"	December 1876	I	4
"On Suicide and Arrogance"	December 1876	I	5
"A Story from the Lives of Children"	December 1876	II	1
"An Explanation Regarding My Participation in the Forthcoming Publication of the Magazine Light"	December 1876	II	2
"Where Does the Matter Stand at the Moment?"	December 1876	II	3
"A Short Comment on 'Pondering Peter'"	December 1876	II	4
"Three Ideas"	January 1877	I	1
"Mirages. Stuckism and the Radstockists"	January 1877	I	2
"Foma Danilov. A Russian Hero Tortured to Death"	January 1877	I	3
"A Conciliatory Dream beyond the Scope of Science"	January 1877	II	1
"We Are but Useless Wretches in Europe"	January 1877	II	2
"An Old Story about the Petrashevsky Circle"	January 1877	II	3
"Russian Satire. Virgin Soil. Last Songs. Old Reminiscences"	January 1877	II	4
"The Boy Celebrating His Saint's Day"	January 1877	II	5
"Editor's Note"	January 1877	–	–
"Self-appointed Prophets and Lame Coopers Who Continue to Manufacture the Moon on Gorokhovaia Street. One of Russia's Least-known Great Men"	February 1877	I	1
"Home-grown Giants and a Humiliated Son of a Mountain Village. An Anecdote about Skin Flayed from the Back. The Higher Interests of Civilization, and 'May They Be Damned If They Must Be Purchased at Such a Price!'"	February 1877	I	2
"On Chris Copping to complete the woodwind Generally and Various Aberrations in Particular. Hatred of Authority with Toadyism of Thought"	February 1877	I	3
"Metternichts and Don Quixotes"	February 1877	I	4
"One of Today's Most Important Questions"	February 1877	II	1
"The Issue of the Day"	February 1877	II	2
"The Issue of the Day in Europe"	February 1877	II	3
"The Russian Solution to the Problem"	February 1877	II	4
"An Answer to a Letter"	February 1877	–	–
"One More on the Subject That, Sooner or Later, Constantinople Must Be Ours"	March 1877	I	1
"The Russian People Have Completely Matured to a Sane Conception of the Eastern Question from Their Own Standpoint"	March 1877	I	2
"The Most Appropriate Thoughts for the Present Time"	March 1877	I	3
"'The Jewish Question'"	March 1877	II	1
"Pro and Contra"	March 1877	II	2
"Status in Statu. Forty Centuries of Existence"	March 1877	II	3
"But Long Live Brotherhood!"	March 1877	II	4
"The Funeral of 'The Universal Man'"	March 1877	III	1
"An Isolated Case"	March 1877	III	2
"To Our Correspondents"	March 1877	III	3
"War. We Are Stronger Than the Others"	April 1877	I	1
"War Is Not Always a Scourge; Sometimes It Is Salvation	April 1877	I	2
"Does Shed Blood Save Us?"	April 1877	I	3
"The Opinion of the 'Most Serene' Tsar on the Eastern Question"	April 1877	I	4
"The Dream of a Ridiculous Man"	April 1877	II	–
"The Defendant Kornilova Is Freed"	April 1877	II	–
"To My Readers"	April 1877	II	–
"From the Book of Predictions of Johann Lichtenberger, 1528	May / June 1877	I	1
"An Anonymous Abusive Letter"	May / June 1877	I	2
"A Plan for a Satirical Novel of Contemporary Life"	May / June 1877	I	3
"Former Farmers—Future Diplomats"	May / June 1877	II	1
"Diplomacy Facing World Problems"	May / June 1877	II	2
"Never Has Russia Been as Powerful as Now—A Nondiplomatic Judgement"	May / June 1877	II	3
"The German World Problem. Germany—A Protesting Country"	May / June 1877	III	1
"One Brilliantly Suspicious Man"	May / June 1877	III	2
"Both Angry and Strong"	May / June 1877	III	3
"The Black Army. The Opinions of the Legions as a New Element of Civilization"	May / June 1877	III	4
"A Rather Unpleasant Secret"	May / June 1877	III	5
"Those Who Love the Turks"	May / June 1877	IV	1
"Golden Tailcoats. Straight-Line People"	May / June 1877	IV	2
"A Conversation with Moscow Acquaintance. A Note Apropos of a New Booklet"	July / August 1877	I	1
"The Hunger for Rumours and for 'What They Are Telling Us.' The Expression 'They Aren't Telling Us' May Have a Future, and So Some Advance Measures Should Be Taken. More about the Accidental Family"	July / August 1877	I	2
"The Case of the Dzhunkovsky Parents and Their Children"	July / August 1877	I	3
"An Imaginary Speech by the Presiding Judge"	July / August 1877	I	4
"Dissociation Again. Part Eight of Anna Karenina"	July / August 1877	II	1
"Confessions of a Slavophile"	July / August 1877	II	2
"Anna Karenina as a Fact of Special Importance"	July / August 1877	II	3
"A Landowner Who Gets Faith in God from a Peasant"	July / August 1877	II	4
"The Irritability of Vanity"	July / August 1877	III	1
"Tout ce qui n'est pas expressément permit et défendu"	July / August 1877	III	2
"On the Uneducated and Illiterate Russian People's Unerring Knowledge of the Real Essence of the Eastern Question"	July / August 1877	III	3
"Levin's Agitation. A Question: Does Distance Have an Influence on Love for Humanity? Can One Agree with the Opinion of One Turkish Prisoner on the Humaneness of Some of Our Ladies? So What, Then, Are Our Teachers Teaching Us?"	July / August 1877	III	4
"The Unfortunate and Unsuccessful"	September 1877	I	1
"A Curious Character"	September 1877	I	2
"That's It, Yet It Isn't It. A Reference to What I Wrote Three Months Ago"	September 1877	I	3
"What Austria Is Now Thinking About"	September 1877	I	4
"Who's Knocking at the Door? Who Will Come In? Inescapable Fate"	September 1877	I	5
"A Lie Is Saved by a Lie"	September 1877	II	1
"Slugs Taken for Human Beings. Which Is Better: When People Know the Truth about Us or When They Talk Nonsense About Us?"	September 1877	II	2
"An Intimation of the Future Educated Russian Man. The Certain Lot of the Future Russian Woman"	September 1877	II	3
"To the Reader"	October 1877	I	1
"An Old, Customary Military Rule"	October 1877	I	2
"The Same Rule, Only In a New Guise"	October 1877	I	3
"The Most Enormous Military Errors May Sometimes Not Be Errors at All"	October 1877	I	4
"We Have Only Stumbled over a New Fact, but There Was No Error. Two Armies, Two Opposites. The Actual State of Affairs"	October 1877	I	5
"Hartung's Suicide and Our Eternal Question: Who Is to Blame?"	October 1877	II	1
"The Russian Gentleman. A Gentleman Cannot but Remain a Gentleman to the End"	October 1877	II	2
"Lies are Indispensable for Truth. A Lie Times a Lie Equals Truth. Is That True?"	October 1877	II	3
"Roman Clericals Here in Russia"	October 1877	III	1
"Old Poland's Summer Attempt at Reconciliation"	October 1877	III	2
"The Escapade of The Stock-Exchange News. Not Ready Pens, Malicious Ones"	October 1877	III	3
"What Does the Word 'Striutsky' Mean?"	November 1877	I	1
"The History of the Verb 'Stushevatsia'"	November 1877	I	2
"Servility or Good Manners?"	November 1877	II	1
"The Most Extreme Case of Servility There Could Be"	November 1877	II	2
"Some Quite Special Remarks about the Slavs That I Intended to Make Long Ago"	November 1877	II	3
"Rumours of Peace. 'Constantinople Must Be Ours'—Is That Possible? Various Opinions"	November 1877	III	1
"Once More, for the Last Time, Some 'Soothsayings'"	November 1877	III	2
"The Moment Must be Seized"	November 1877	III	3
"The Concluding Explanation of an Old Fact"	December 1877	I	1
"The Excerpt"	December 1877	I	2
"Distortions and Manipulation of the Evidence—These Cost Us Nothing"	December 1877	I	3
"Malicious Psychologists. Obstetrician-Psychiatrists"	December 1877	I	4
"One Incident that Explains a Good Deal, in My View"	December 1877	I	5
"Am I an Enemy of Children? On What the Word 'Happy' Sometimes Means"	December 1877	I	6
"The Death of Nekrasov. On What Was Said at His Grave"	December 1877	II	1
"Pushkin, Lermontov, and Nekrasov"	December 1877	II	2
"Poet and Citizen. General Views of Nekrasov as a Man"	December 1877	II	3
"A Witness in Nekrasov's Favor"	December 1877	II	4
"To the Readers"	December 1877	II	5
"Explanatory Note Concerning the Speech on Pushkin Printed Below"	August 1880	I	–
"Pushkin (A Sketch)"	August 1880	II	–
"Taking Advantage of an Opportunity. Four Lectures on Various Topics Apropos of One Lecture Given to Me by Mr. A. Gradovsky. With an Address to Mr. Gradovsky"	August 1880	III	–
"On One Most Basic Point"	August 1880	III	1
"Aleko and Derzhimorda. Aleko's Sufferings for a Peasant Serf. Anecdotes"	August 1880	III	2
"Two Halves"	August 1880	III	3
"To One—'Humble Thyself'; To Another—'Exalt Thyself.' A Tempest in a Teapot"	August 1880	III	4
"Finances. A Citizen as an Offended Thersites. Crowning from Below and the Musicians. A Refuge for Windbags and the Windbags"	January 1881	I	1
"Can We Expect European Finances in Russia?"	January 1881	I	2
"Forget Immediate Problems So That the Roots Can Be Restored. Through Lack of Ability I Enter into Something Spiritual"	January 1881	I	3
"The First Root. Instead of an Authoritative Financial Tone I Lapse into Old Words. The Broad Ocean. The Longing for Truth and the Necessity for Serenity, So Useful in Financial Matters"	January 1881	I	4
"Let Them Speak First, and for the Moment Let Us Stand Aside Simply to Acquire Some Good Sense"	January 1881	I	5
"A Witty Bureaucrat. His Opinion of Our Liberals and Europeans"	January 1881	II	1
"Krylov's Fable about a Certain Pig"	January 1881	II	2
"Geok-Tepe. What Does Asia Mean to Us?"	January 1881	II	3
"Questions and Answers"	January 1881	II	4
