= Winter Notes on Summer Impressions =

Russian essay

"Winter Notes on Summer Impressions" (Russian: Зимние заметки о летних впечатлениях Zimniye zametki o letnikh vpechatleniyakh) is an essay by the Russian author Fyodor Dostoevsky. It was first published in Vremya, a monthly magazine edited by Dostoyevsky himself.

The essay consists of the travel notes of Dostoevsky's 1862 trip to Europe as well as his reflections on perception of Russians in Europe.

It is regarded as an early statement of some of Dostoevsky's favourite concepts.

== Themes ==
=== Political ===
Dostoevsky, while not a Marxist, agreed with some of Karl Marx's criticisms of Europe. A believer in Pan-Slavism, Dostoevsky disliked European culture for its corruption and criticized those of his countrymen who tried to imitate it.

=== Religious ===
During his travels, Dostoevsky observed both Protestants (in England) and Catholics. He believed that the Anglicans were "proud and rich ... pompously and seriously [believing] in their own solidly moral virtues and in their right to preach a staid and complacent morality." Meanwhile, Dostoevsky thought Catholic priests used charity to manipulate the poor into conversion. Elsewhere Dostoevsky argued that Orthodoxy was superior to both, protecting, but not forcing, unity within the church.

=== Social ===
Dostoevsky's observations about English and French national characteristics reverse those of most travelers during his era. He suggests that the French are hypocritical as well as irrational, also considering the France populace to be repressed by the presence of the French secret police. The English, conversely, are proud. Well-to-do Englishmen consider themselves too elevated to attend to the plight of the poor, who are desperate and violent.

== Literary significance and criticism ==
Dostoevsky admitted weaknesses in Winter Notes, chiefly because he traveled too quickly through some parts of Europe (notably Germany) to properly appreciate them. Even friendly critics have recognized that Dostoevsky's style in this work is poor. The work, however, contains motifs that would later appear in Notes from Underground, and some critics consider it a first draft of that later, more successful book.
