= Mr. Prokharchin =

1846 short story by Fyodor Dostoevsky

"Mr. Prokharchin" (Russian: Господин Прохарчин, Gospodin Prokharchin), also translated as "Mr. Prohartchin", is a short story written in 1846 by Fyodor Dostoevsky and first published in the Annals of the Fatherland. Inspired by a true story, it depicts the miserly life of the protagonist, Mr. Prokharchin, a patronym derived from the Russian word for 'grub' or 'vittles', kharchi. He seems to be extremely poor, eating frugal meals and sleeping on a mattress directly on the floor. His landlady and the other tenants feel sorry for him. On his death, they eventually discover that the man was in fact wealthy and was living in that way voluntarily. A large sum of money is found hidden inside his mattress.

In his review of the short story, Lantz comments that "'Mr. Prokharchin's dreams, in which the accumulation of money figures prominently, express his anxiety about his sense of self and his guilt over the selfishness that has isolated him from other human beings."
