= The Eternal Husband =

1870 novella by Fyodor Dostoevsky

- Author: Fyodor Dostoevsky
- Original title: Вечный муж (Vechny Muzh)
- Translators: Constance Garnett, Richard Pevear
- Language: Russian
- Genre: novella
- Publisher: The Russian Messenger (series)
- Publication date: 1870
- Media type: Print (Hardback & Paperback) & Audio book

The Eternal Husband (Russian: Вечный муж, Vechny muzh) is a novella by Russian author Fyodor Dostoevsky that was first published in 1870 in Zarya magazine. The novella's plot revolves around the complicated relationship between the nobleman Velchaninov and the widower Trusotsky, whose deceased wife was Velchaninov's former lover.

== Plot summary ==
Alexei Ivanovich Velchaninov is a land owner who stays in Saint Petersburg for a trial about a piece of land. He receives a visit from Pavel Pavlovich Trusotsky, an old acquaintance who recently became a widower. Velchaninov had an affair with Trusotsky's wife Natalia, and he realizes that he is the biological father of Liza, Trusotsky's eight-year-old daughter. Velchaninov, who doesn't want Liza to be raised by an alcoholic, brings Liza to a foster family. Liza dies there.

Trusotsky now wants to marry Nadia, the fifteen-year-old daughter of civil servant Zakhlyobinin. She's the sixth daughter of eight. Trusotsky takes Velchaninov with him to visit his fiancée, and buys her a bracelet. Trusotsky is ridiculed by Zakhlyobinin's daughters and locked up during a game of hide-and-seek. Nadia gives the bracelet to Velchaninov, asking him to return it to Trusotsky and tell him she doesn't want to marry him. Nadia is secretly engaged to Alexander Lobov, a nineteen-year-old boy.

Trusotsky spends the night in Velchaninov's room and tries to kill him with a razor knife. Velchaninov manages to defend himself, injuring his left hand.

Sometime later, when Velchaninov has won his trial, the two meet again at a railway station. Trusotsky is remarried, but a young army officer is travelling with him and his wife. Trusotsky's new wife invites Velchaninov to visit them, but Trusotsky asks him to ignore this invitation.

== Analysis ==
The story starts in medias res. Details about Velchaninov's adulterous past are revealed gradually.

The novel is comparable to a tragicomedy. The main tragic event is Liza's death. The comical element is the character of Trusotsky, who seems to be predestined to repeat the role of the cuckold.

== Critical reception ==
The Eternal Husband is one of Dostoevsky's lesser-known novels. The subject of a deceived husband is lighter than in his other novels, but some critics say this novel ranks among his best works because of its style and structure. Alfred Bem calls it "one of the most complete works by Dostoevsky in regards to its composition and development." American novelist Henry Miller considered it to be his favourite work by Dostoevsky.
