= Fyodor Dostoevsky bibliography =

Fyodor Dostoyevsky bibliography
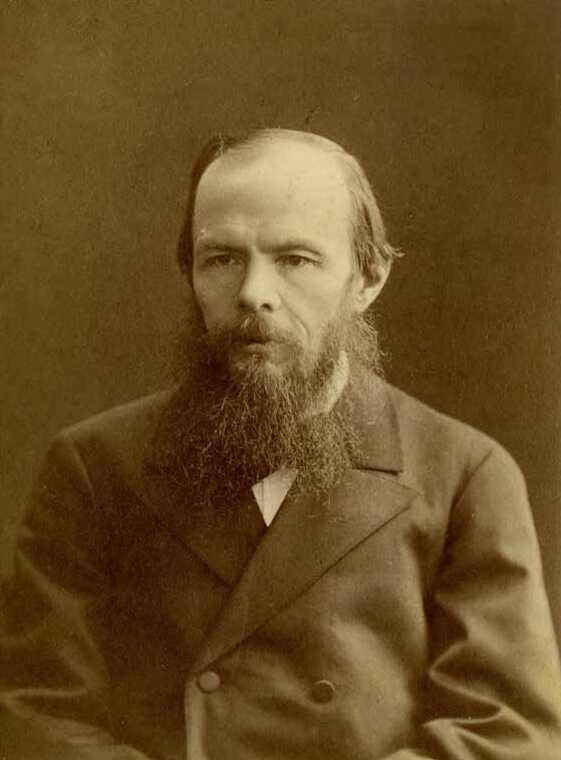
- Fyodor Dostoyevsky, 1879
- Novels↙: 13
- Articles↙: 221 +
- Stories↙: 18
- Pamphlets↙: 1
- Plays↙: (3)
- Journals↙: 2
- Letters↙: 725
- Translations↙: 1 (4)
- Books edited↙: 1
- Poems and epigrams↙: 10
- Almanacs↙: 3
- Novellas↙: 3

Fyodor Dostoyevsky (1821–1881) wrote novels, novellas, short stories, essays and other literary works. Raised by a literate family, Dostoyevsky discovered literature at an early age, beginning when his mother introduced the Bible to him. Nannies near the hospitals—in the grounds of which he was raised—introduced Dostoyevsky to fairy tales, legends and sagas. His mother's subscription to the Library of Reading gave him access to the leading contemporary Russian and non-Russian literature. After his mother's death, Dostoyevsky moved from a boarding school to a military academy and despite the resulting lack of money, he was captivated by literature until his death.

Dostoyevsky started his writing career after finishing university. He started translating literature from French—which he learnt at the boarding school—into Russian, and then wrote short stories. With the success of his first novel, Poor Folk, he became known throughout Saint Petersburg and Russia. Vissarion Belinsky, Alexander Herzen and others praised Poor Folk's depiction of poverty, and Belinsky called it Russia's "first social novel". This success did not continue with his second novel, The Double, and other short stories published mainly in left-wing magazines. These magazines included Notes of the Fatherland and The Contemporary.

Dostoyevsky's renewed financial troubles led him to join several political circles. Because of his participation in the Petrashevsky Circle, in which he distributed and read several Belinsky articles deemed as anti-religious and anti-government, he and other members were sentenced to capital punishment. He was pardoned at the last minute, but they were imprisoned in Siberia—Dostoyevsky for four years. During his detention he wrote several works, including the autobiographical The House of the Dead. A New Testament booklet, which had been given shortly before his imprisonment, and other literature obtained outside of the barracks, were the only books he read at that time.

Following his release, Dostoyevsky read a myriad of literature and gradually became interested in nationalistic and conservative philosophies and increasingly sceptical towards contemporary movements—especially the Nihilists. Dostoyevsky wrote his most important works after his time in Siberia, including Crime and Punishment, The Idiot, The Gambler, Demons, and The Brothers Karamazov. With the help of his brother Mikhail, Dostoyevsky opened two magazines—Vremya and Epoch—in which some of his stories appeared. Following their closures, most of his works were issued in the conservative The Russian Messenger until the introduction of A Writer's Diary, which comprised most of his works—including essays and articles. Several drafts and plans, especially those begun during his honeymoon, were unfinished at his death.

== Novels and novellas ==
List of novels and novellas of Fyodor Dostoyevsky
Title	Year	1st publisher	1st English translator	Notes	Ref.
Poor Folk Бедные люди, Bednye Lyudi	1846	Saint Petersburg Collection	Lena Milman (1894)	Novel	
The Double Двойник, Dvoynik	1846	Notes of the Fatherland	Constance Garnett (1917)	Novel	
The Landlady Хозяйка, Khozayka	1847	Notes of the Fatherland	Charles James Hogarth (1913) (Note: With The Gentle Maiden and Letters from the Underworld)	Novella	
Netochka Nezvanova Неточка Незванова	1849	Notes of the Fatherland	Constance Garnett (1920) (Note: Under the title Nyetochka Nyezvanov, included in The Novels of Fyodor Dostoevsky, with The Friend of the Family)	Novel; unfinished	
Uncle's Dream Дядюшкин сон, Dyadushkin son	1859	The Russian Word	Frederick Whishaw (1888) (Note: Included in Uncle's Dream; and, The Permanent Husband, with The Permanent Husband)	Novella	
The Village of Stepanchikovo Село Степанчиково и его обитатели, Selo Stepanchikovo i evo obitateli	1859	The Russian Messenger	Frederick Whishaw (1887) (Note: Included in The Friend of the Family; and The Gambler under the title The Friend of the Family, with The Gambler)	Novel; also known as The Friend of the Family	
Humiliated and Insulted Униженные и оскорблённые, Unizhyonnye i oskorblyonye	1861	Vremya	Frederick Whishaw (1887) (Note: Under the title Injury and Insult)	Novel; also known as Insulted and Injured and Injury and Insult	
The House of the Dead Записки из Мёртвого дома, Zapiski iz Myortvogo doma	1861	Vremya	Marie von Thilo (1881) (Note: Under the title Buried Alive: Or, Ten Years of Penal Servitude in Siberia)	Novel; also known as House of the Dead, or Prison Life in Siberia and Buried Alive: Or, Ten Years of Penal Servitude in Siberia	
Notes from Underground Записки из подполья, Zapiski iz podpol'ya	1864	Epoch	Charles James Hogarth (1913) (Note: Under the title Letters from the Underworld, with The Gentle Maiden and The Landlady)	Novella in two parts; also known as Notes from the Underground and Letters from the Underworld	
Crime and Punishment Преступление и наказание, Prestupleniye i nakazaniye	1866	The Russian Messenger	Frederick Whishaw (1885)	Novel	
The Gambler Игрок, Igrok	1866	Self-published	Frederick Whishaw (1887) (Note: Included in The Friend of the Family; and The Gambler with The Friend of the Family)	Novel	
The Idiot Идиот, Idiot	1869	The Russian Messenger	Frederick Whishaw (1887)	Novel	
The Eternal Husband Вечный муж, Vechnyi muzh	1869	The Twilight	Frederick Whishaw (1888) (Note: Included in Uncle's Dream; and, The Permanent Husband, with Uncle's Dream)	Novel; also known as The Permanent Husband	
Demons Бесы, Besy	1872	The Russian Messenger	Constance Garnett (1914)	Novel; also known as The Possessed and The Devils	
The Adolescent Подросток, Podrostok	1875	Notes of the Fatherland	Constance Garnett (1916)	Novel; also known as The Raw Youth and An Accidental Family	
The Brothers Karamazov Братья Карамазовы, Brat'ya Karamazovy	1880	The Russian Messenger	Constance Garnett (1912)	Novel in twelve "books" and an epilogue; originally intended as first part of the epic The Life of a Great Sinner	

== Short stories ==
List of short stories of Fyodor Dostoyevsky
Title	Year	1st publisher	1st English translator	Notes	Ref.
"Mr. Prokharchin" Господин Прохарчин, Gospodin Prokharchin	1846	Notes of the Fatherland	Constance Garnett (1918) (Note: Included in White Nights and Other Stories, with "White Nights", Notes from Underground, "A Faint Heart", "A Christmas Tree and a Wedding", "Polzunkov", "A Little Hero")		
"Novel in Nine Letters" Роман в девяти письмах, Roman v devyati pis'makh	1847	The Contemporary	Unknown (1900) (Note: Short stories by Fiodor Dostoievski, includes "An Honest Thief", "Novel in Nine Letters", "An Unpleasant Predicament", "Another Man's Wife", "The Heavenly Christmas Tree", "The Peasant Marey", "The Crocodile", "Bobok", "The Dream of a Ridiculous Man")		
"A Jealous Husband" Ревнивый муж, Revnyvyi muzh	1848	Notes of the Fatherland	–		
"Another Man's Wife" Чужая жена, Chuzhaya zhena	1848	Notes of the Fatherland	–		
"Another Man's Wife and a Husband Under the Bed" Чужая жена и муж под кроватью, Chuzhaya zhena i muzh pod krovat'yu	1848	Notes of the Fatherland	Unknown (1900)	Merger between "A Jealous Husband" and "Another Man's Wife"	
"A Weak Heart" Слабое сердце, Slaboe serdtse	1848	Notes of the Fatherland	Constance Garnett (1918) (Note: Under the title "A Faint Heart", included in White Nights and Other Stories, with "White Nights", Notes from Underground, "A Christmas Tree and a Wedding", "Polzunkov", "A Little Hero" and "Mr. Prohartchin")	Also known as "A Faint Heart"	
"Polzunkov" Ползунков, Polzunkov	1848	The Contemporary	Constance Garnett (1918) (Note: Included in White Nights and Other Stories, with "White Nights", Notes from Underground, "A Faint Heart", "A Christmas Tree and a Wedding", "A Little Hero" and "Mr. Prohartchin")		
"An Honest Thief" Честный вор, Chestnyi vor	1848	Notes of the Fatherland	Unknown (1900)		
"A Christmas Tree and a Wedding" Ёлка и свадьба, Yolka i svad'ba	1848	Notes of the Fatherland	Constance Garnett (1918) (Note: Included in White Nights and Other Stories, with "White Nights", Notes from Underground, "A Faint Heart", "Polzunkov", "A Little Hero" and "Mr. Prohartchin")		
"White Nights" Белые ночи, Belye nochi	1848	Notes of the Fatherland	Constance Garnett (1918) (Note: Included in White Nights and Other Stories, with Notes from Underground, "A Faint Heart", "A Christmas Tree and a Wedding", "Polzunkov", "A Little Hero" and "Mr. Prohartchin")		
"A Little Hero" Маленький герой, Malenkiy geroy	1849	Notes of the Fatherland	Constance Garnett (1918) (Note: Included in White Nights and Other Stories, with "White Nights", Notes from Underground, "A Faint Heart", "A Christmas Tree and a Wedding", "Polzunkov" and "Mr. Prohartchin")		
"A Nasty Story" Скверный анекдот, Skvernyi anekdot	1862	Vremya	Unknown (1900)	Also known as "A Disgraceful Affair", "A Nasty Anecdote", "A Most Unfortunate Incident", "An Unpleasant Predicament"	
"The Crocodile" Крокодил, Krokodil	1865	Epoch	Unknown (1900)		
"Bobok" Бобок, Bobok	1873	The Citizen	Unknown (1900)		
"The Peasant Marey" Мужик Марей, Muzhik Marey	1876	A Writer's Diary	Unknown (1900)		
"The Heavenly Christmas Tree" Мальчик у Христа на ёлке, Mal'chik u Khrista na yolke	1876	A Writer's Diary	Unknown (1900)		
"A Gentle Creature" Кроткая, Krotkaya	1876	A Writer's Diary	Constance Garnett (1917) (Note: Under the title "A Gentle Spirit", included in The Eternal Husband and Other Stories, with The Eternal Husband, The Double)	Also known as "The Meek One", "A Gentle Maiden", "The Gentle Maiden", "A Gentle Spirit"	
"The Dream of a Ridiculous Man" Сон смешного человека, Son smeshnogo cheloveka	1877	A Writer's Diary	Unknown (1900)		

== Articles and essays ==
Diary articles

Dostoyevsky wrote 221 Diary articles (excluding short stories listed in the respective section above) within two periods. The initial 1873 works were published in The Citizen, the editor of which was Dostoyevsky, and from 1876 – 1877 the Diary was self-published. The English titles of the following list of works are extracted from Kenneth Lantz's two-volume translations.

A Writer's Diary is a collection mainly of essays and articles, which also include, for example, answers to readers, introductions, etc., making the Diaries a journal-like book written and mostly edited by Dostoyevsky.

List of initial Diary articles, issued in 1873:

- "Introduction"
- "Old People"
- "Environment"
- "Something Personal"
- "Vlas"
- "A Troubled Countenance"
- "A Half-Letter From 'A Certain Person'"
- "Apropos of the Exhibition"
- "An Impersonator"
- "Dreams and Musings"
- "Apropos of a New Play"
- "Little Picture"
- "To a Teacher"
- "Something about Lying"
- "One of Today's Falsehoods"

Other articles and essays

Dostoyevsky wrote articles and essays outside the Diaries collection. These include the 1863 travelogue Winter Notes on Summer Impressions, in which he satirised and criticised European life. Other articles were written in response or as a criticism to a literary work, a person's view, requests to the military during the imprisonment period, announcements, notes and explanations. Some of them were written for different journals or almanacs.

== Letters ==
List of letters by Fyodor Dostoyevsky (all dates follow the Julian calendar).
Addressee	Location	Date	Ref.
M. A. Dostoyevsky Father	Darovoye	29 June 1832	
M. F. Dostoyevskaya Mother	Moscow	23 August 1833	
M. F. Dostoyevskaya Mother	Moscow	(after 20) April – early May 1834	
M. F. Dostoyevskaya Mother	Moscow	9 May 1835	
M. F. Dostoyevskaya Mother	Moscow	26 May 1835	
M. A. Dostoyevsky Father	Saint Petersburg	23 July 1837	
M. A. Dostoyevsky Father	Saint Petersburg	6 September 1837	
M. A. Dostoyevsky Father	Saint Petersburg	4 February 1838	
M. A. Dostoyevsky Father	Saint Petersburg	5 – 10 May 1839	
M. M. Dostoyevsky Brother	Saint Petersburg	9 August 1838	
M. M. Dostoyevsky Brother	Saint Petersburg	16 August 1838	
M. M. Dostoyevsky Brother	Saint Petersburg	31 October 1838	
A. A. Kumanin / А. F. Kumanina Uncle / aunt	Saint Petersburg	25 December 1839	
M. M. Dostoyevsky Brother	Saint Petersburg	1 January 1840	
M. M. Dostoyevsky Brother	Petergof	19 July 1840	
M. M. Dostoyevsky Brother	Saint Petersburg	22 December 1841	
Captain Gartong Chief of the Officers' Departments of the Main Academy of Engineering	Saint Petersburg	8 June 1843	
Captain Gartong Chief of the Officers' Departments of the Main Academy of Engineering	Saint Petersburg	13 June 1843	
P. A. Karepin Widower	Saint Petersburg	November – December 1843	
M. M. Dostoyevsky Brother	Saint Petersburg	31 December 1843	
M. M. Dostoyevsky Brother	Saint Petersburg	2nd half of January 1844	
M. M. Dostoyevsky Brother	Saint Petersburg	July – August 1844	
M. M. Dostoyevsky Brother	Saint Petersburg	2nd half of August / early September 1844	
P. A. Karepin Widower	Saint Petersburg	7 September 1844	
M. M. Dostoyevsky Brother	Saint Petersburg	30 September 1844	
M. M. Dostoyevsky Brother	Saint Petersburg	24 March 1845	
M. M. Dostoyevsky Brother	Saint Petersburg	3 September 1845	
M. M. Dostoyevsky Brother	Saint Petersburg	8 October 1845	
M. M. Dostoyevsky Brother	Saint Petersburg	16 November 1845	
M. M. Dostoyevsky Brother	Saint Petersburg	1 February 1846	
M. M. Dostoyevsky Brother	Saint Petersburg	1 April 1846	
M. M. Dostoyevsky Brother	Saint Petersburg	26 April 1846	
M. M. Dostoyevsky Brother	Saint Petersburg	5 September 1846	
M. M. Dostoyevsky Brother	Saint Petersburg	17 September 1846	
M. M. Dostoyevsky Brother	Saint Petersburg	26 November 1846	
M. M. Dostoyevsky Brother	Saint Petersburg	17 December 1846	
M. M. Dostoyevsky Brother	Saint Petersburg	January – February 1847	
E. P. Maykova Apollon Maykov's mother	Saint Petersburg	14 May 1848	
A. A. Krayevsky Journalist, founder of Notes of the Fatherland	Saint Petersburg	31 March 1849	
M. M. Dostoyevsky Brother	Saint Petersburg (Peter and Paul Fortress)	18 July 1849	
M. M. Dostoyevsky Brother	Saint Petersburg (Peter and Paul Fortress)	27 August 1849	
M. M. Dostoyevsky Brother	Saint Petersburg (Peter and Paul Fortress)	14 September 1849	
M. M. Dostoyevsky Brother	Saint Petersburg (Peter and Paul Fortress)	22 December 1849	
M. M. Dostoyevsky Brother	Omsk	30 January – 22 February 1854	
N. D. Fonvizina Decembrist	Omsk	Late January – (20–29) February 1854	
M. M. Dostoyevsky Brother	Semipalatinsk	30 July 1854	
E. I. Yakushkin Lawyer, ethnographer, bibliographer	Semipalatinsk	15 April 1855	
M. D. Isaeva First wife	Semipalatinsk	4 June 1855	
A. E. Wrangel Baron	Semipalatinsk	14 August 1855	
P. E. Annenkova Decembrist	Semipalatinsk	18 October 1855	
M. M. Dostoyevsky Brother	Semipalatinsk	13 – 18 Januaryr 1856	
A. N. Maykov Poet	Semipalatinsk	18 January 1856	
A. E. Wrangel Baron	Semipalatinsk	23 March 1856	
M. M. Dostoyevsky Brother	Semipalatinsk	24 March 1856	
E. I. Totleben General	Semipalatinsk	24 March 1856	
A. E. Wrangel Baron	Semipalatinsk	13 April 1856	
A. E. Wrangel Baron	Semipalatinsk	23 May 1856	
A. E. Wrangel Baron	Semipalatinsk	14 July 1856	
M. M. Dostoyevsky Brother	Semipalatinsk	9 November 1856	
S. S. Walikhanov Scholar, ethnographer, historian	Semipalatinsk	14 December 1856	
A. E. Wrangel Baron	Semipalatinsk	21 December 1856	
M. M. Dostoyevsky Brother	Semipalatinsk	22 December 1856	
M. M. Dostoyevsky Brother	Semipalatinsk	9 March 1857	
E. I. Yakushkin Jurist, ethnographer, bibliographer	Semipalatinsk	1 June 1857	
Colonel Belikhov Commander of the 7th Siberian Line Battalion Lieutenant-Colonel	Semipalatinsk	27 July 1857	
M. M. Dostoyevsky Brother	Semipalatinsk	3 November 1857	
M. N. Katkov Journalist	Semipalatinsk	11 January 1858	
Reverse (Note: If a military personnel writes a letter with the title "reverse", it means that he apologizes for resigning from the military. The person affirms that he won't receive any subsidies.)	Semipalatinsk	16 January 1858	
M. M. Dostoyevsky Brother	Semipalatinsk	18 January 1858	
Alexander II Emperor	Semipalatinsk	Early March 1858	
A. M. Pavlovsky Director of the Siberian Cadet Corps	Semipalatinsk	2nd half of May 1858	
M. M. Dostoyevsky Brother	Semipalatinsk	31 May 1858	
M. M. Dostoyevsky Brother	Semipalatinsk	11 April 1859	
M. M. Dostoyevsky Brother	Semipalatinsk	9 May 1859	
M. M. Dostoyevsky Brother	Tver	19 September 1859	
M. M. Dostoyevsky Brother	Tver	1 October 1859	
Alexander II Emperor	Tver	10 – 18 October 1859	
V. A. Dolgoruky Head of the Third Section of His Imperial Majesty's Own Chancellery	Tver	3 November 1859	
A. E. Timashev Superintendent of the Third Section of His Imperial Majesty's Own Chancellery	Tver	3 November 1859	
M. M. Dostoyevsky Brother	Tver	12 November 1859	
M. M. Dostoyevsky Brother	Tver	12 November 1859	
V. A. Dolgoruky Head of the Third Section of His Imperial Majesty's Own Chancellery	Tver	19 November 1859	
A. I. Shubert Actress	Saint Petersburg	3 May 1860	
Y. P. Polonsky Poet	Saint Petersburg	31 July 1861	
A. N. Ostrovsky Poet	Saint Petersburg	24 August 1861	
N. N. Strakhov Philosopher, publicist, literary critic	Paris	26 June 1862	
N. A. Nekrasov Poet	Saint Petersburg	3 November 1862	
I. S. Turgenev Writer	Saint Petersburg	17 – 19 June 1863	
M. M. Dostoyevsky Brother	Turin	8 September 1863	
N. N. Strakhov Philosopher, publicist, literary critic	Rome	18 September 1863	
I. S. Turgenev Writer	Rome	6 October 1863	
M. M. Dostoyevsky Brother	Moscow	19 November 1863	
I. S. Turgenev Writer	Saint Petersburg	23 December 1863	
M. M. Dostoyevsky Brother	Moscow	29 February 1864	
M. M. Dostoyevsky Brother	Moscow	20 March 1864	
M. M. Dostoyevsky Brother	Moscow	26 March 1864	
M. M. Dostoyevsky Brother	Moscow	5 April 1864	
M. M. Dostoyevsky Brother	Moscow	13 – 14 April 1864	
M. M. Dostoyevsky Brother	Saint Petersburg	29 July 1864	
I. S. Turgenev Writer	Saint Petersburg	20 September 1864	
A. V. Korvin-Krukovskaya Socialist, feminist	Saint Petersburg	14 December 1864	
I. S. Turgenev Writer	Saint Petersburg	13 February 1865	
A. E. Wrangel Baron	Saint Petersburg	31 March – 14 April 1865	
N. P. Suslova Physician	Saint Petersburg	19 April 1865	
A. A. Krayevsky Journalist, founder of Notes of the Fatherland	Saint Petersburg	8 June 1865	<
I. S. Turgenev Writer	Wiesbaden	3 August 1865	
A. P. Suslova Writer	Wiesbaden	10 August 1865	
A. P. Suslova Writer	Wiesbaden	12 August 1865	
A. E. Wrangel Baron	Wiesbaden	24 August 1865	
M. N. Katkov Journalist	Wiesbaden	10 – 15 September 1865	
A. E. Wrangel Baron	Saint Petersburg	8 November 1865	
A. E. Wrangel Baron	Saint Petersburg	18 February 1866	
M. N. Katkov Journalist	Saint Petersburg	25 April 1866	
A. V. Korvin-Krukovskaya Socialist, feminist	Moscow	17 June 1866	
V. A. Lyubimova Artist	Lyublino	8 July 1866	
A. P. Milyukov Critic, publisher	Lyublino	10 – 15 July 1866	
M. N. Katkov Journalist	Lyublino	19 July 1866	
N. A. Lyubimov Physicist	Saint Petersburg	2 November 1866	
N. A. Lyubimov Physicist	Saint Petersburg	16 November 1866	
N. A. Lyubimov Physicist	Saint Petersburg	9 December 1866	
N. A. Lyubimov Physicist	Saint Petersburg	13 December 1866	
A. G. Snitkina Stenographer	Moscow	2 January 1867	
A. P. Milyukov Critic, publisher	Saint Petersburg	13 February 1867	
A. P. Suslova Writer	Dresden	23 April 1867	<
A. G. Dostoyevskaya Stenographer, second wife	Dresden	5 May 1867	
A. G. Dostoyevskaya Stenographer, second wife	Bad Homburg	6 May 1867	
A. G. Dostoyevskaya Stenographer, second wife	Bad Homburg	9 May 1867	
A. G. Dostoyevskaya Stenographer, second wife	Bad Homburg	10 May 1867	
A. G. Dostoyevskaya Stenographer, second wife	Bad Homburg	13 May 1867	
A. N. Maykov Poet	Geneva	16 August 1867	
A. N. Maykov Poet	Geneva	15 September 1867	
S. D. Yanovsky Physician	Geneva	28 September 1867	
S. A. Ivanova Niece	Geneva	29 September 1867	
S. D. Yanovsky Physician	Geneva	1 – 2 November 1867	
A. N. Maykov Poet	Geneva	31 December 1867	
S. A. Ivanova Niece	Geneva	1 January 1868	
A. N. Maykov Poet	Geneva	18 February 1868	
A. N. Maykov Poet	Geneva	21 – 22 March 1868	
A. G. Dostoyevskaya Stenographer, second wife	Saxon les Bains	23 March 1868	
S. A. Ivanova Niece	Geneva	29 March 1868	
A. N. Maykov Poet	Geneva	18 May 1868	
A. N. Maykov Poet	Vevey	22 June 1868	
A. N. Maykov Poet	Vevey	21 July 1868	
A foreign magazine's editor	Vevey	Late August – early September 1868	
A. N. Maykov Poet	Milan	22 October 1868	
A. N. Maykov Poet	Florence	11 December 1868	
N. N. Strakhov Philosopher, publicist, literary critic	Florence	12 December 1868	
S. A. Ivanova Niece	Florence	25 January 1869	
N. N. Strakhov Philosopher, publicist, literary critic	Florence	26 February 1869	
S. A. Ivanova Niece	Florence	8 March 1869	
N. N. Strakhov Philosopher, publicist, literary critic	Florence	18 March 1869	
N. N. Strakhov Philosopher, publicist, literary critic	Florence	6 April 1869	
A. N. Maykov Poet	Florence	15 May 1869	
A. N. Maykov Poet	Dresden	27 October 1869	
A. N. Maykov Poet	Dresden	12 February 1869	
N. N. Strakhov Philosopher, publicist, literary critic	Dresden	26 February 1870	
N. N. Strakhov Philosopher, publicist, literary critic	Dresden	24 March 1870	
A. N. Maykov Poet	Dresden	25 March 1870	
N. N. Strakhov Philosopher, publicist, literary critic	Dresden	28 May 1870	
N. N. Strakhov Philosopher, publicist, literary critic	Dresden	11 June 1870	
M. N. Katkov Journalist	Dresden	8 October 1870	
A. N. Maykov Poet	Dresden	9 October 1870	
N. N. Strakhov Philosopher, publicist, literary critic	Dresden	9 October 1870	
N. N. Strakhov Philosopher, publicist, literary critic	Dresden	2 December 1870	
N. N. Strakhov Philosopher, publicist, literary critic	Dresden	10 February 1871	
A. N. Maykov Poet	Dresden	2 March 1871	
N. N. Strakhov Philosopher, publicist, literary critic	Dresden	18 March 1871	
N. N. Strakhov Philosopher, publicist, literary critic	Dresden	23 April 1871	
N. N. Strakhov Philosopher, publicist, literary critic	Dresden	18 May 1871	
V. D. Obolenskaya Princess	Saint Petersburg	20 January 1872	
N. A. Lyubimov Physicist	Saint Petersburg	Late March – early April 1872	
A. A. Romanov Future emperor	Saint Petersburg	10 February 1872	
M. P. Pogodin Historian, journalist	Saint Petersburg	21 February 1873	
M. P. Pogodin Historian, journalist	Saint Petersburg	26 February 1873	
M. P. Fyodorov Publisher, politician	Saint Petersburg	19 September 1873	
V. P. Meshchersky Journalist, novelist	Saint Petersburg	3 – 4 November 1873	
A. F. Koni Lawyer, judge	Saint Petersburg	February 1874	
A. G. Dostoyevskaya Stenographer, second wife	Bad Ems	12 June 1874	
N. A. Nekrasov Poet	Staraya Russa	20 October 1874	
A. G. Dostoyevskaya Stenographer, second wife	Saint Petersburg	6 February 1875	
A. G. Dostoyevskaya Stenographer, second wife	Saint Petersburg	9 February 1875	
A. G. Dostoyevskaya Stenographer, second wife	Saint Petersburg	12 February 1875	
A. G. Dostoyevskaya Stenographer, second wife	Saint Petersburg	24 May 1875	
A. G. Dostoyevskaya Stenographer, second wife	Bad Ems	10 June 1875	
A. N. Pleshcheyev Poet	Staraya Russa	21 August 1875	
Y. P. Polonsky Poet	Saint Petersburg	4 February 1876	
K. D. Alchevskaya Pedagogue	Saint Petersburg	9 April 1876	
S. E. Lurie Translator, correspondent	Saint Petersburg	16 April 1876	
V. A. Alekseyev Philologist	Saint Petersburg	7 June 1876	
A. G. Dostoyevskaya Stenographer, second wife	Bad Ems	15 July 1876	
V. S. Solovyov Novelist	Bad Ems	16 July 1876	
A. G. Dostoyevskaya Stenographer, second wife	Bad Ems	21 July 1876	
L. V. Golovina Follower of Rasputin	Bad Ems	23 July 1876	
K. I. Maslyannikov	Saint Petersburg	5 November 1876	
A. F. Gerasimova	Saint Petersburg	7 March 1877	
S. E. Lurie Translator, correspondent	Saint Petersburg	11 March 1877	
S. E. Lurie Translator, correspondent	Saint Petersburg	17 April 1877	
A. G. Dostoyevskaya Stenographer, second wife	Saint Petersburg	6 July 1877	
A. G. Dostoyevskaya Stenographer, second wife	Saint Petersburg	15 – 16 July 1877	
D. V. Averkiyev Playwright, writer, theatrical critic, translator	Saint Petersburg	5 November 1877	
D. V. Averkiyev Playwright, writer, theatrical critic, translator	Saint Petersburg	18 November 1877	
N. L. Ozmidov Writer	Saint Petersburg	February 1878	
V. V. Mikhailov	Saint Petersburg	16 March 1878	
N. P. Peterson Pedagogue	Saint Petersburg	24 March 1878	
Unknown	Saint Petersburg	27 March 1878	
E. About Novelist, publicist, journalist (Note: In French)	Saint Petersburg	2 April 1878	
F. F. Radetsky Soldier	Saint Petersburg	16 April 1878	
A. P. Filosofova Feminist	Saint Petersburg	8 May 1878	
N. M. Dostoyevsky Brother	Saint Petersburg	16 May 1878	
P. A. Isayev	Saint Petersburg	16 May 1878	
A. G. Dostoyevskaya Stenographer, second wife	Moscow	20 – 21 June 1878	
A. G. Dostoyevskaya Stenographer, second wife	Moscow	22 June 1878	
A. G. Dostoyevskaya Stenographer, second wife	Moscow	29 June 1878	
S. A. Yuryev Writer, actor	Staraya Russa	11 July 1878	
A. G. Dostoyevskaya Stenographer, second wife	Moscow	9 November 1878	
A. G. Dostoyevskaya Stenographer, second wife	Moscow	10 November 1878	
V. P. Gayevsky Critic, literary historian	Saint Petersburg	10 March 1879	
V. F. Putsykovich Writer	Saint Petersburg	12 March 1879	
K. K. Romanov Grand Duke	Saint Petersburg	15 March 1879	
N. A. Lyubimov Physicist	Staraya Russa	10 May 1879	
К. P. Pobedonostsev Jurist, statesman, religious supervisor, Tsarist adviser	Staraya Russa	19 May 1879	
К. P. Pobedonostsev Jurist, statesman, religious supervisor, Tsarist adviser	Staraya Russa	19 May 1879	
N. A. Lyubimov Physicist	Staraya Russa	25 May 1879	
N. A. Lyubimov Physicist	Staraya Russa	11 June 1879	
Е. А. Stackenschneider Littérateur, daughter of Andrei Stackenschneider	Staraya Russa	15 June 1879	
F. Thomon President of the National Literary Association	Staraya Russa	Early July 1879	
A. P. Filosofova Feminist	Staraya Russa	11 July 1879	
N. A. Lyubimov Physicist	Bad Ems	7 August 1879	
A. G. Dostoyevskaya Stenographer, second wife	Bad Ems	13 August 1879	
К. P. Pobedonostsev Jurist, statesman, religious supervisor, Tsarist adviser	Bad Ems	24 August 1879	
N. A. Lyubimov Physicist	Saint Petersburg	16 November 1879	
V. V. Samoylov Actor	Saint Petersburg	17 December 1879	
A. N. Kurnosova	Saint Petersburg	15 January 1880	
E. F. Junge Artist, cousin of Leo Tolstoy, daughter of sculptor Fyodor Tolstoy	Saint Petersburg	11 April 1880	
A. S. Suvorin Publisher, journalist	Staraya Russa	14 May 1880	
A. G. Dostoyevskaya Stenographer, second wife	Moscow	23 – 24 May 1880	
A. G. Dostoyevskaya Stenographer, second wife	Moscow	25 May 1880	
A. G. Dostoyevskaya Stenographer, second wife	Moscow	26 May 1880	
A. G. Dostoyevskaya Stenographer, second wife	Moscow	27 May 1880	
A. G. Dostoyevskaya Stenographer, second wife	Moscow	28 May 1880	
A. G. Dostoyevskaya Stenographer, second wife	Moscow	29 May 1880	
A. G. Dostoyevskaya Stenographer, second wife	Moscow	30 – 31 May 1880	
A. G. Dostoyevskaya Stenographer, second wife	Moscow	1 June 1880	
A. G. Dostoyevskaya Stenographer, second wife	Moscow	3 June 1880	
A. G. Dostoyevskaya Stenographer, second wife	Moscow	4 June 1880	
A. G. Dostoyevskaya Stenographer, second wife	Moscow	5 June 1880	
A. G. Dostoyevskaya Stenographer, second wife	Moscow	7 June 1880	
A. G. Dostoyevskaya Stenographer, second wife	Moscow	8 June 1880	
S. A. Tolstaya Wife of Leo Tolstoy	Staraya Russa	13 June 1880	
Е. А. Stackenschneider Littérateur, daughter of Andrei Stackenschneider	Staraya Russa	17 July 1880	
N. A. Lyubimov Physicist	Staraya Russa	10 August 1880	
A. G. Dostoyevskaya Stenographer, second wife	Staraya Russa	11 August 1880	
M. A. Polivanova Wife of pedagogue Leo Polivanov	Staraya Russa	16 August 1880	
N. L. Ozmidov Writer	Staraya Russa	18 August 1880	
I. S. Aksakov Littérateur	Staraya Russa	28 August 1880	
N. A. Lyubimov Physicist	Staraya Russa	8 September 1880	
N. A. Lyubimov Physicist	Saint Petersburg	8 November 1880	
A. A. Tolstaya Great aunt of Leo Tolstoy	Saint Petersburg	5 January 1881	
N. A. Lyubimov Physicist	Saint Petersburg	26 January 1881	
E. N. Geiden Baroness	Saint Petersburg	28 January 1881	

== Translations ==
List of literary works translated by Fyodor Dostoyevsky into Russian.
Title	Date	Notes	Ref.
Mathilde by Eugène Sue	1843	Abandoned due to lack of funds	
Eugénie Grandet by Honoré de Balzac	1844	The only finished translation. Published in June/July 1843 in the 6th and 7th volume of the journal Repertoire and Pantheon	
La dernière Aldini by George Sand	1844	Abandoned because a translation was published in 1837	
Lectures on the History of Philosophy by Georg Wilhelm Friedrich Hegel	1855	Proposed collaborative translation with friend Wrangel (a speaker of German)	
Psyche by Carl Gustav Carus	1855	Proposed collaborative translation with friend Wrangel (a speaker of German)	

== Almanacs ==
- Prankster (Зубоскал): a short, humorous almanac first mentioned on 8 October 1845 in a letter to his brother Mikhail. Nekrasov established the plan and headed it with Dostoyevsky and Grigorovich. According to Grigorovich it was censored because of the message "Prankster will laugh at anything which is laughable." Its themes are similar as Dostoyevsky's early works, such as Poor Folk and The Double; a man and his sick ambitions outlining typical characteristics of Muscovites and Peterburgians; flâneurs; etc. In a letter on 2 December 1845, Nekrasov stated that parts would appear in the 1846 release of April the First.
- Peterburgian Chronicles (Петербургская летопись)
- A Number of Articles about Russian Literature (Ряд статей о Русской литературе)

== Poems, epigrams and limericks ==
- "An Epigram about a Bavarian Colonel" (Епиграмма на Баварского полковника) (mid-1864): an epigram which criticises poems from A. A. Kraevsky's The Voice
- "Tell Me, Why Did You Ravage It So..." (Скажи, зачем ты так разорил...) (mid-1864): begins as a three-line poem. It too mocks The Voice, specifically a brutal romance
- "Describing Nothing but the Priests" (Описывать всё сплошь одних попов) (1873): a planned epigram about Nikolay Leskov and his 1874 novel A Decayed Family, which appeared in The Russian Messenger
- "Children are Dear" (Дорого стоят детишки) (1876–77): a limerick about his wife Anna included in a notebook of A Writer's Diary
- "The Crash of Baymakov's Enterprise..." (Крах конторы Баймакова...) (4 December 1876): a poem about the insolvencies of two Saint Petersburg offices, Baymakova and Lurie.
- "Do Not Steal, Fedul..." (Не разбойничай, Федул...) (2 December 1879): several limericks about his wife, son and daughters included in a notebook of The Brothers Karamazov
- "She's All in Tears of Indignation..." (Вся в слезах негодованья...) (September – October 1868): a humorous poem written in Milan by Dostoyevsky and his wife.
- "I Asked My Wife for Soap..." (Я просил жену про мыло...) (autumn 1867 or winter 1867/1868 – May): a humorous poem written in Geneva by Dostoyevsky and his wife.
- "We've Been Living in Poverty for Two Generations..." (Два рода мы бедно живем...) (26 February – 6 April 1869)
- "Do You, Brother, Have Any Conscience..." (Есть ли у тебя, брать, совесть...) (26 February – 6 April 1869)

== Collaborative works ==
- How Dangerous are Ambitious Dreams (Как опасно предаваться честолюбовым снам) (1846): a mixture of prose and poetry written by Dostoyevsky, Nikolay Nekrasov (the main writer) and Dmitry Grigorovich. Published on 1 April 1846 in the almanac April the First, with illustrations by artists including Pavel Fedotov and Alexander Agin. Also announced on that date
- One Mission (poem). A Theme under the Name "Imperator" (Одна Мысль (поэма) — Тема под названием «Император») (October / November 1867): begins as a poem until interlineations occur. Appeared in the same notebook as The Idiot, suggesting that it is an additional text to that novel. The protagonist has similar traits as Prince Myshkin. The main influence is Mikhail Semevsky's work about the life of Ivan VI from 1740 to 1764, a part of Russkaya Starina. Dostoyevsky may have already heard of it in Geneva, where he stayed between October and November 1867. One Mission was reworked by Grigory Danilevsky and included in Milovich, which appeared in 1879 in The Russian Messenger alongside The Brothers Karamazov.
- The Life of a Great Sinner (Житие великого грешника) (December 1869 – January 1870): an unfinished novel and poem. Written between December 1869 and January 1870, it was abandoned until some elements were incorporated into A Raw Youth. Similar parts of The Life of a Great Sinner were also indicated in The Possessed and The Brothers Karamazov.

== Pamphlets ==
- Fighting Nihilism with Honesty (an Officer and a Female Nihilist) (Борьба нигилизма с честностью (офицер и нигилистка)) (1864–73): a pamphlet planned since mid-1864 while working on "About a Man Who Was Eaten by a Crocodile"

== Other ==
- The Goblin (Домовой) (?): an undated, unfinished plan
- The Siberian Notebook (Сибирская тетрадь) (probably 1852–3): an undated manuscript comprising 486 numbered notes written during Dostoyevsky's imprisonment in Omsk. Probably preserved by a feldsher.
- A Leaping Maiden... (Расскакавшуюся деву...) (summer 1866): a two-line work written while resting in Lyublino near Moscow with his sister Vera Ivanova in mid-1866.
- The Holy-Fool (The Sworn Attorney) (Юродивый (присяжный поверенный)) (late May / early September 1868): an idea connected with The Idiot. Some motives were later borrowed and incorporated in The Demons.
- Stabbed to Death After the Bible (После Библии зарезал) (September / October 1869): written during The Eternal Husband. Similar motive as The Idiot's, and the main character conforms to the one in The Eternal Husband. Intended to be published in The Russian Messenger instead of Zarya for financial reasons.
- (?) (mid-1872): "An idea". Included in the same notebook as the last part of The Possessed, which appeared from November and December 1872 in The Russian Messenger and printed in The Citizen the next year.
- (?) (13 September 1874) – "Drama in Tobolsk": about the happenings in Staraya Russa, where the Dostoyevskys planned their winter holidays since August 1874. The father of a praporshchik named Dmitry Ilynskov suddenly disappears until 10 months later when his body is found in a ditch under a house in Tobolsk in 1845. Murderer unclear. First draft of the first part of The Brothers Karamazov.
- To Koslov (Козлову) (March 1875): a planned story about writer and translator Pavel Kozlov, whose stories Dostoyevky may had read in Zarya before meeting with him and his wife not later than January 1873 (probably 31 January). His stories later also appeared between 1873 and 1874 in The Citizen.
- Sorokoviny (Сороковины) (1 August 1875): included in an 1872–5 notebook with another piece about Pushkin. Work also announced in December 1877, but remained unfinished. Some thoughts were included in The Brothers Karamazov, especially in book nine, volume III–V and book eleven, volume IX.
- The Dreamer (Мечтатель) (March/April 1876 – January 1877): a socio-psychological work about a "dreamer", a common theme since "White Nights".
- To Nekrasov's Novella (В повесть Некрасову) (1876–77): three fragments which may had formed a complete work. First two were written in mid-1876 during the July/August and September issues of A Writer's Diary. Third fragment written around January 1877. All three may have been issued in Nekrasov's Notes of the Fatherland
- Slesarek (Слесарек) (2nd half of 1876) – ?
- Karl Ivanovich's History (История Карла Ивановича) (1874 or 9 March 1875): a work in which a man named Karl Ivanovich recounts history. The person's name and character were borrowed from Leo Tolstoy's Childhood (1852) and Boyhood (1854), both of which Dostoyevsky read in 1855; about the time he wrote The Raw Youth and A Writer's Diary.
