= List of letters from Fyodor Dostoevsky =

In almost fifty years, Fyodor Dostoevsky wrote more than 725 letters, 315 of which are preserved. Although Dostoevsky hated writing letters (but enjoyed reading letters), as he believed that he could not impress himself properly, they form a majority of his works. They are such important resources of his life and beliefs that the whole corpus of letters equals a biography.

== Letters ==
List of letters by Fyodor Dostoyevsky (all dates follow the Julian calendar, except where noted).
#	Addressee	Location	Date	St.	Ref.
1	Unknown	?	?	!	
1	I. F. Gorbunov; Littérateur, actor, writer	?	?	!	
1	M. A. Dostoyevsky; Father	Darovoye	29 June 1832	!	
1	M. F. Dostoyevskaya; Mother	Moscow	23 August 1833	!	
1	M. F. Dostoyevskaya; Mother	Moscow	(after 20) April – early May 1834	!	
1	M. F. Dostoyevskaya; Mother	Moscow	9 May 1835	!	
2	M. F. Dostoyevskaya; Mother	Moscow	autumn 1835	?	
1	M. F. Dostoyevskaya; Mother	Moscow	26 May 1835	!	
1	N. I. Shidlovsky; Friend	Saint Petersburg	between 1837 and 1840	?	
1	А. F. Kumanina; Aunt	Saint Petersburg	3 July 1837	?	
1	M. A. Dostoyevsky; Father	Saint Petersburg	23 July 1837	!	
1	M. A. Dostoyevsky; Father	Saint Petersburg	6 September 1837	!	
1	А. F. Kumanina; Aunt	Saint Petersburg	27 September 1837	?	
1	A. A: Kumanin / А. F. Kumanina; Uncle / aunt	Saint Petersburg	October – November 1837	?	
1	M. A. Dostoyevsky; Father	Saint Petersburg	4 February 1838	!	
1	M. A. Dostoyevsky; Father	Saint Petersburg	late March – early April 1838	?	
3	M. M. Dostoyevsky; Brother	Saint Petersburg	between 22 April and 9 August 1838	?	
1	M. A. Dostoyevsky; Father	Saint Petersburg	5 – 10 May 1839	!	
1	M. M. Dostoyevsky; Brother	Saint Petersburg	9 August 1838	!	
1	M. M. Dostoyevsky; Brother	Saint Petersburg	16 August 1838	!	
2	M. A. Dostoyevsky / M. M. Dostoyevsky; Father / Brother	Saint Petersburg	early October 1838	?	
1	M. M. Dostoyevsky; Brother	Saint Petersburg	31 October 1838	!	
1	M. M. Dostoyevsky; Brother	Saint Petersburg	between 31 October 1838 and 1st half of June 1839	?	
5	M. A. Dostoyevsky / M. M. Dostoyevsky; Father / Brother	Saint Petersburg	November 1838 – February 1839	?	
1	M. M. Dostoyevsky; Brother	Saint Petersburg	2nd half of June 1839	?	
1	A. A: Kumanin / А. F. Kumanina; Uncle / aunt	Saint Petersburg	25 December 1839	!	
1	M. M. Dostoyevsky; Brother	Saint Petersburg	1 January 1840	!	
1	M. M. Dostoyevsky; Brother	Saint Petersburg	early 1840	?	
1	M. M. Dostoyevsky; Brother	Petergof	19 July 1840	!	
1	P. A. Karepin; Widower	Saint Petersburg	17 February 1841	?	
1	M. M. Dostoyevsky; Brother	Saint Petersburg	22 December 1841	!	
1	A. M. Dostoyevsky; Brother	Saint Petersburg	January – early February 1843	?	
1	Captain Gartong; Chief of the Officers' Departments of the Main Academy of Engineering	Saint Petersburg	8 June 1843	!	
1	Captain Gartong; Chief of the Officers' Departments of the Main Academy of Engineering	Saint Petersburg	13 June 1843	!	
1	P. A. Karepin; Widower	Saint Petersburg	November – December 1843	!	
1	M. M. Dostoyevsky; Brother	Saint Petersburg	31 December 1843	!	
1	M. M. Dostoyevsky; Brother	Saint Petersburg	2nd half of January 1844	!	
1	M. M. Dostoyevsky; Brother	Saint Petersburg	July – August 1844	!	
1	M. M. Dostoyevsky; Brother	Saint Petersburg	2nd half of August / early September 1844	!	
1	P. A. Karepin; Widower	Saint Petersburg	7 September 1844	!	
1	M. M. Dostoyevsky; Brother	Saint Petersburg	30 September 1844	!	
1	P. A. Karepin; Widower	Saint Petersburg	1st half of October 1844	?	
1	M. M. Dostoyevsky; Brother	Moscow	November 1844	?	
1	M. M. Dostoyevsky; Brother	Saint Petersburg	24 March 1845	!	
1	M. M. Dostoyevsky; Brother	Saint Petersburg	3 September 1845	!	
1	M. M. Dostoyevsky; Brother	Saint Petersburg	8 October 1845	!	
1	M. M. Dostoyevsky; Brother	Saint Petersburg	16 November 1845	!	
1	S. D. Yanovsky; Physician	Saint Petersburg	January – February 1846	?	
1	M. M. Dostoyevsky; Brother	Saint Petersburg	1 February 1846	!	
1	M. M. Dostoyevsky; Brother	Saint Petersburg	1 April 1846	!	
1	M. M. Dostoyevsky; Brother	Saint Petersburg	26 April 1846	!	
1	M. M. Dostoyevsky; Brother	Saint Petersburg	5 September 1846	!	
1	M. M. Dostoyevsky; Brother	Saint Petersburg	17 September 1846	!	
1	M. M. Dostoyevsky; Brother	Saint Petersburg	between 17 September and 7 October 1846	?	
1	M. M. Dostoyevsky; Brother	Saint Petersburg	26 November 1846	!	
1	M. M. Dostoyevsky; Brother	Saint Petersburg	17 December 1846	!	
1	M. M. Dostoyevsky; Brother	Saint Petersburg	January – February 1847	!	
1	M. M. Dostoyevsky; Brother	Pargolovo	summer 1847	?	
1	M. M. Dostoyevsky; Brother	Saint Petersburg	between April and 9 September 1847	?	
1	S. D. Yanovsky; Physician	Saint Petersburg	early September 1847	?	
1	E. P. Maykova; Apollon Maykov's mother	Saint Petersburg	14 May 1848	!	
1	A. A. Krayevsky; Journalist, founder of Notes of the Fatherland	Saint Petersburg	– 1 March half of April 1849	?	
1	A. A. Krayevsky; Journalist, founder of Notes of the Fatherland	Saint Petersburg	31 March 1849	!	
1	M. M. Dostoyevsky; Brother	Saint Petersburg (Peter and Paul Fortress)	18 July 1849	!	
1	M. M. Dostoyevsky; Brother	Saint Petersburg (Peter and Paul Fortress)	27 August 1849	!	
1	M. M. Dostoyevsky; Brother	Saint Petersburg (Peter and Paul Fortress)	14 September 1849	!	
1	M. M. Dostoyevsky; Brother	Saint Petersburg (Peter and Paul Fortress)	22 December 1849	!	
1	N. D. Fonvizina; Decembrist	Omsk	1853	?	
1	M. M. Dostoyevsky; Brother	Omsk	winter 1853	?	
1	N. A. Kryzhanovsky; Officer	Semipalatinsk	1854–1857	?	
1	M. M. Dostoyevsky; Brother	–	late January 1854	?	
1	V. M. Ivanova / А. F. Kumanina; Sister / aunt	–	late January – February 1854	?	
1	M. M. Dostoyevsky; Brother	Omsk	30 January – 22 February 1854	!	
1	N. D. Fonvizina; Decembrist	Omsk	late January – (20–29) February 1854	!	
1	E. M. Nevorotova	Semipalatinsk	from March 1854 on	?	
1	M. M. Dostoyevsky; Brother	Semipalatinsk	1st half of March 1854	?	
2	M. M. Dostoyevsky / V. M. Karepina; Brother / sister	Semipalatinsk	March – early August 1854	?	
1	M. M. Dostoyevsky; Brother	Semipalatinsk	late May – June 1854	?	
1	M. M. Dostoyevsky; Brother	Semipalatinsk	30 July 1854	!	
2	Relatives	Semipalatinsk	August 1854	?	
1	Unknown	Semipalatinsk	October 1854 – not later than 23rd	?	
1	Relatives	Semipalatinsk	1st half of November 1854	?	
1	Relatives	Semipalatinsk	November 1854	?	
2	Relatives	Semipalatinsk	December 1854 – not later than 18th	?	
1	E. I. Yakushkin; Lawyer, ethnographer, bibliographer	Semipalatinsk	15 April 1855	!	
1	K. I. Ivanov	Semipalatinsk	15 April 1855	?	
1	Relatives	Semipalatinsk	May 1855 – not later than 21st	?	
1	M. D. Isayevna; First wife	Semipalatinsk	2nd half of May 1855	?	
1	Relatives	Semipalatinsk	late May – early June 1855	?	
1	M. D. Isayeva; First wife	Semipalatinsk	4 June 1855	!	
1	Relatives	Semipalatinsk	1st half of June	?	
1	A. E. Wrangel; Baron	Semipalatinsk	14 August 1855	!	
2	M. D. Isayeva; First wife	Semipalatinsk	14 August 1855	?	
1	M. D. Isayeva; First wife	Semipalatinsk	between 14 and 23 August 1855	?	
1	M. M. Dostoyevsky; Brother	Semipalatinsk	August 1855	?	
1	M. D. Isayeva; First wife	Semipalatinsk	– 1 September half of December 1855	?	
1	P. E. Annenkova; Decembrist	Semipalatinsk	18 October 1855	!	
2	Unknown	Semipalatinsk	late November – early December 1855	?	
1	M. M. Dostoyevsky; Brother	Semipalatinsk	late December 1855	?	
1	M. M. Dostoyevsky; Brother	Semipalatinsk	13 – 18 January 1856	!	
3	V. M. Karepina / V. M. Ivanova / A. A: Kumanin; Sister / sister / uncle	Semipalatinsk	between 13 and 18 January 1856	?	
1	K. I. Ivanov	Semipalatinsk	between 13 and 18 January 1856	?	
1	V. F. Odoevsky; Philosopher, writer, music critic	Semipalatinsk	between 13 and 18 January 1856	?	
1	A. N. Maykov; Poet	Semipalatinsk	18 January 1856	!	
1	Unknown	Semipalatinsk	late February 1856	?	
1	M. D. Isayeva; First wife	Semipalatinsk	February – March 1856	?	
1	M. D. Isayeva; First wife	Semipalatinsk	2nd half of March 1856	?	
1	M. D. Isayeva; First wife	Semipalatinsk	18 March 1856	?	
1	A. E. Wrangel; Baron	Semipalatinsk	23 March 1856	!	
1	M. M. Dostoyevsky; Brother	Semipalatinsk	24 March 1856	!	
1	E. I. Totleben; General	Semipalatinsk	24 March 1856	!	
1	A. E. Wrangel; Baron	Semipalatinsk	13 April 1856	!	
1	M. D. Isayeva / N. B. Vergunov; First wife / husband of latter	Semipalatinsk	– 1 April half of July 1856	?	
1	I. V. Zhdan-Pushkin	Semipalatinsk	1st half of July 1856	?	
1	Y. A. Slutsky; Lawyer, General	Semipalatinsk	1st half of July – early November 1856	?	
1	A. E. Wrangel; Baron	Semipalatinsk	23 May 1856	!	
1	A. E. Wrangel; Baron	Semipalatinsk	14 July 1856	!	
1	Unknown	Semipalatinsk	early September 1856	?	
1	M. M. Dostoyevsky; Brother	Semipalatinsk	9 November 1856	!	
1	Susanne	Semipalatinsk	– 1 November half of December 1856	?	
1	A. A. de Grave	Semipalatinsk	late November – early December 1856	?	
1	S. S. Walikhanov; Scholar, ethnographer, historian	Semipalatinsk	14 December 1856	!	
1	A. E. Wrangel; Baron	Semipalatinsk	21 December 1856	!	
1	M. M. Dostoyevsky; Brother	Semipalatinsk	22 December 1856	!	
1	A. A: Kumanin; Uncle	Semipalatinsk	late December 1856	?	
1	M. M. Dostoyevsky; Brother	Semipalatinsk	9 March 1857	!	
1	E. I. Yakushkin; Jurist, ethnographer, bibliographer	Semipalatinsk	1 June 1857	!	
1	Colonel Belikhov; Commander of the 7th Siberian Line Battalion Lieutenant-Colonel	Semipalatinsk	27 July 1857	!	
3	Y. A. Slutsky / A. A. de Grave / Cadets; Lawyer, General	Semipalatinsk	late July 1857	?	
1	A. N. Pleshcheyev; Poet	Semipalatinsk	September 1957	?	
1	M. M. Dostoyevsky; Brother	Semipalatinsk	3 November 1857	!	
1	A. P. Ivanov; Brother-in-law (husband of sister Vera)	Semipalatinsk	23 November 1857	?	
1	M. N. Katkov; Journalist	Semipalatinsk	11 January 1858	!	
1	Reverse (Note: If a military personnel writes a letter with the title "reverse", it means that he apologizes for resigning from the military. The person affairs that he won't receive any subsidies.)	Semipalatinsk	16 January 1858	!	
1	M. M. Dostoyevsky; Brother	Semipalatinsk	18 January 1858	!	
1	Alexander II; Emperor	Semipalatinsk	early March 1858	!	
1	M. M. Dostoyevsky; Brother	Semipalatinsk	11 April 1859	!	
1	A. N. Pleshcheyev; Poet	Semipalatinsk	3 May 1858	?	
1	A. M. Pavlovsky; Director of the Siberian Cadet Corps	Semipalatinsk	2nd half of May 1858	!	
1	M. M. Dostoyevsky; Brother	Semipalatinsk	31 May 1858	!	
1	M. M. Dostoyevsky; Brother	Semipalatinsk	9 May 1859	!	
1	A. N. Pleshcheyev; Poet	Semipalatinsk	28 June 1858	?	
1	A. N. Pleshcheyev; Poet	Semipalatinsk	13 September 1858	?	
1	A. G. Kushelyov-Bezborodko; Patronage	Semipalatinsk	13 September 1858	?	
1	M. M. Dostoyevsky; Brother	Semipalatinsk	October 1858	?	
1	M. N. Katkov; Journalist	Semipalatinsk	January 1859	?	
1	A. N. Pleshcheyev; Poet	Semipalatinsk	January – early February 1859	?	
1	A. N. Pleshcheyev; Poet	Semipalatinsk	14 March 1859	?	
1	M. M. Dostoyevsky; Brother	Semipalatinsk	18 March 1859	?	
2	M. N. Katkov; Journalist	Semipalatinsk	March 1859 and 11 April 1859	?	
1	A. G. Kushelyov-Bezborodko; Patronage	Semipalatinsk	April – early May 1859	?	
1	Editors of The Russian Messenger	Semipalatinsk	1 July 1859	?	
1	M. M. Dostoyevsky; Brother	Tver	18–19 August 1859	?	
1	M. M. Dostoyevsky; Brother	Tver	between 19 and 24 August 1859	?	
1	A. P. Milyukov; Critic, publisher	Tver	late – 1 August half of December 1859	?	
2	M. M. Dostoyevsky; Brother	Tver	early September 1859	?	
1	N. A. Nekrasov; Poet	Tver	1st half of September 1859	?	
3	V. M. Karepina / V. M. Ivanova / А. M. Golenovskaya; Sisters	Tver	– 19 September September 1859	?	
1	M. M. Dostoyevsky; Brother	Tver	19 September 1859	!	
1	M. M. Dostoyevsky; Brother	Tver	late September 1859	?	
1	M. M. Dostoyevsky; Brother	Tver	1 October 1859	!	
2	A. N. Pleshcheyev; Poet	Tver	1st half of October 1859	?	
1	Alexander II; Emperor	Tver	10 – 18 October 1859	!	
1	A. N. Pleshcheyev; Poet	Tver	between 14 and 19 October 1859	?	
1	M. M. Dostoyevsky; Brother	Tver	15/16 October 1859	?	
1	M. M. Dostoyevsky; Brother	Tver	23/24/25 October 1859	?	
1	A. N. Pleshcheyev; Poet	Tver	late October – (26) October 1859	?	
1	V. A. Dolgoruky; Head of the Third Section of His Imperial Majesty's Own Chancellery	Tver	3 November 1859	!	
1	A. E. Timashev; Supervisor of the Third Section of His Imperial Majesty's Own Chancellery	Tver	3 November 1859	!	
1	M. M. Dostoyevsky; Brother	Tver	around 9 November 1859	?	
1	M. M. Dostoyevsky; Brother	Tver	12 November 1859	!	
1	M. M. Dostoyevsky; Brother	Tver	12 November 1859	!	
2	M. M. Dostoyevsky; Brother	Tver	14/15 November 1859	?	
1	V. A. Dolgoruky; Head of the Third Section of His Imperial Majesty's Own Chancellery	Tver	19 November 1859	!	
1	M. M. Dostoyevsky; Brother	Tver	19 – 22 November 1859	?	
1	A. N. Pleshcheyev; Poet	Tver	10 December 1859	?	
1	M. M. Dostoyevsky; Brother	Tver	14 and 15 November 1859	?	
1	A. N. Pleshcheyev; Poet	Tver	18/19 December 1859	?	
1	E. Tyumentsev; Poet	Saint Petersburg	March – December 1860	?	
1	A. N. Pleshcheyev; Poet	Saint Petersburg	1st half of March 1860	?	
1	A. N. Pleshcheyev; Poet	Saint Petersburg	mid-March 1860	?	
1	A. N. Pleshcheyev; Poet	Saint Petersburg	22 March 1860	?	
1	A. I. Shubert; Actress	Saint Petersburg	3 May 1860	!	
1	A. S. Gieroglifov; Publisher, critic, journalist	Saint Petersburg	23 August 1860	!	
1	N. V. Medem; Chairman of the St. Petersburg Censorship Committee	Saint Petersburg	20 September 1860	!	
2	P. V. Bykov; Poet, writer, translator, literary historian, bibliographer	Saint Petersburg	early 1861	?	
1	F. M. Tolstoy; Music critic, composer	Saint Petersburg	late April – early May 1861	?	
1	Y. P. Polonsky; Poet	Saint Petersburg	31 July 1861	!	
1	A. N. Ostrovsky; Poet	Saint Petersburg	24 August 1861	!	
1	Society for Aid to Needy Writers and Scholars (Note: Collaborative letter with Mikhail Dostoyevsky and publisher Nikolay Tiblen)	Saint Petersburg	23 September 1861	!	
1	N. L. Tiblen; Publisher, typographer	Saint Petersburg	3 October 1861	?	
1	I. S. Turgenev; Writer	Saint Petersburg	Late October 1861	?	
1	I. S. Turgenev; Writer	Saint Petersburg	December 1861	?	
1	A. F. Bazunov; Publisher	Saint Petersburg	16 January 1862	!	
1	I. S. Turgenev; Writer	Saint Petersburg	February 1862	?	
1	I. S. Turgenev; Writer	Saint Petersburg	1st half of March 1862	?	
1	A. N. Pleshcheyev; Poet	Saint Petersburg	1st half of March 1862	?	
1	S. S. Walikhanov; Scholar, ethnographer, historian	Saint Petersburg	May – early June 1862	?	
1	M. F. Dostoyevskaya; Mother	Saint Petersburg	6 June 1862	!	
1	M. M. Dostoyevsky; Brother	Berlin	mid-June 1862	?	
1	N. N. Strakhov; Philosopher, publicist, literary critic	Paris	26 June 1862	!	
1	M. M. Dostoyevsky; Brother	Paris	mid-July 1862	?	
1	M. M. Dostoyevsky; Brother	Geneva	2nd half of July 1862	?	
1	M. M. Dostoyevsky; Brother	Florence	1st half of August 1862	?	
1	E. I. Korsini	Saint Petersburg	September – October 1862	?	
1	N. A. Nekrasov; Poet	Saint Petersburg	3 November 1862	!	
1	N. Adamov	Saint Petersburg	15 November 1862	?	
1	I. S. Turgenev; Writer	Saint Petersburg	January 1863	?	
1	E. N. Akhamatova; Writer, translator	Saint Petersburg	10–12 February 1863	?	
1	I. N. Berezin; Paymaster of the Society for Aid to Needy Writers and Scholars (Note: Collaborative letter with Yegor Kovalevsky, head of the Literary Fund)	Saint Petersburg	18 February 1863	!	
1	N. Adamov	Saint Petersburg	around 28 February 1863, 1864 or 1865	?	
1	I. N. Berezin; Paymaster of the Society for Aid to Needy Writers and Scholars	Saint Petersburg	2 March 1863	!	
1	I. N. Berezin; Paymaster of the Society for Aid to Needy Writers and Scholars	Saint Petersburg	4 March 1863	!	
1	I. N. Berezin; Paymaster of the Society for Aid to Needy Writers and Scholars	Saint Petersburg	4 March 1863	!	
1	IOU to the Committee of the Society for Aid to Needy Writers and Scholars	Saint Petersburg	18 March 1863	!	
1	I. N. Berezin; Paymaster of the Society for Aid to Needy Writers and Scholars	Saint Petersburg	25 March 1863	!	
1	M. A. Zagulyaev; Writer, journalist, translator	Saint Petersburg	8–9 May 1863	?	
1	I. S. Turgenev; Writer	Saint Petersburg	17 – 19 June 1863	!	
1	M. V. Rodevich; Writer	Saint Petersburg	July 1863	!	
1	Government Bank	Saint Petersburg	5 August 1863	!	
1	A. P. Suslova; Writer	Berlin	Around 6 August 1863	?	
1	M. M. Dostoyevsky; Brother	Berlin	6 August 1863	?	
1	M. M. Dostoyevsky; Brother	Berlin	6 August 1863	?	
1	M. M. Dostoyevsky; Brother	Berlin	6 August 1863	?	
1	A. P. Suslova; Writer	Berlin	14 August 1863	?	
1	M. M. Dostoyevsky; Brother	Paris	16 August 1863	?	
1	M. V. Rodevich; Writer	Paris	16 August 1863	?	
1	M. M. Dostoyevsky; Brother	Paris	Around 20 August 1863	?	
1	M. M. Dostoyevsky; Brother	Baden-Baden	27 August 1863	?	
1	M. M. Dostoyevsky; Brother	Baden-Baden	27 August 1863	?	
1	M. M. Dostoyevsky; Brother	Rome	September 1863	?	
1	M. M. Dostoyevsky; Brother	Turin	8 September 1863	!	
1	N. N. Strakhov; Philosopher, publicist, literary critic	Rome	18 September 1863	!	
1	I. S. Turgenev; Writer	Rome	6 October 1863	!	
1	A. P. Suslova; Writer	Bad Homburg	14 October 1863	?	
1	M. M. Dostoyevsky; Brother	Moscow	19 November 1863	!	
1	A. K. Tolstoy; Poet, novelist, playwright	Saint Petersburg	5 December 1863	?	
1	I. S. Turgenev; Writer	Saint Petersburg	23 December 1863	!	
1	A. P. Suslova; Writer	?	late 1863 – May 1864	?	
1	M. M. Dostoyevsky; Brother	Moscow	11 – 12 January 1864	?	
1	M. M. Dostoyevsky; Brother	Moscow	25 January 1864	?	
1	M. M. Dostoyevsky; Brother	Moscow	late January 1864	?	
1	M. M. Dostoyevsky; Brother	Moscow	29 February 1864	!	
1	M. M. Dostoyevsky; Brother	Moscow	20 March 1864	!	
1	M. M. Dostoyevsky; Brother	Moscow	26 March 1864	!	
7	N. Popov	Saint Petersburg	April 1864 – 25 January 1866	?	
1	M. M. Dostoyevsky; Brother	Moscow	5 April 1864	!	
1	M. M. Dostoyevsky; Brother	Moscow	13 – 14 April 1864	!	
1	M. M. Dostoyevsky (Note: A telegram); Brother	Moscow	15 April 1864	?	
1	M. M. Dostoyevsky; Brother	Moscow	23 April 1864	?	
1	A. P. Suslova; Writer	Saint Petersburg	2 June 1864	?	
1	IOU to the Committee of the Society for Aid to Needy Writers and Scholars	Saint Petersburg	4 June 1864	!	
1	N. M. Dostoyevsky; Brother	Pavlovsk	8 – 9 July 1864	?	
1	M. M. Dostoyevsky; Brother	Saint Petersburg	29 July 1864	!	
2	I. S. Turgenev; Writer	Saint Petersburg	24 August – 20 September 1864	?	
1	D. A. Insarsky	Saint Petersburg	27 August 1864	?	
1	A. V. Korvin-Krukovskaya; Socialist, feminist	Saint Petersburg	late August – early September 1864	?	
1	A. A. Golovachev	Saint Petersburg	2 – 3 September 1864	?	
1	P. N. Gorsky; Poet, writer	Saint Petersburg	2nd half of September 1864	?	
1	I. S. Turgenev; Writer	Saint Petersburg	20 September 1864	!	
1	A. A. Golovachev	Saint Petersburg	23 October 1864	?	
1	A. A. Golovachev	Saint Petersburg	late November 1864	?	
1	A. V. Korvin-Krukovskaya; Socialist, feminist	Saint Petersburg	November / early December 1864	?	
1	A. V. Korvin-Krukovskaya; Socialist, feminist	Saint Petersburg	14 December 1864	!	
1	N. Adamov	Saint Petersburg	around 20 December 1864	?	
1	A. N. Pleshcheyev; Poet	Saint Petersburg	around 20 December 1864	?	
1	M. Brown	Saint Petersburg	late December 1864	?	
1	A. N. Ostrovsky; Poet	Saint Petersburg	late December 1864	?	
1	N. F. Fyodorov; Philosopher	Saint Petersburg	December 1864 – February 1865	?	
1	P. N. Gorsky; Poet, writer	Saint Petersburg	early January 1865	?	
1	N. A. Chayev; Writer, dramaturg	Saint Petersburg	7 January 1865	?	
1	N. A. Chayev; Writer, dramaturg	Saint Petersburg	2nd half of January 1865	?	
1	A. V. Zimenko	Saint Petersburg	2nd half of January 1865	?	
1	P. N. Rybnikov; Ethnographer	Saint Petersburg	26 January 1865	?	
1	A. V. Zimenko	Saint Petersburg	February – March 1865	?	
1	I. S. Turgenev; Writer	Saint Petersburg	13 February 1865	!	
1	N. F. Fyodorov; Philosopher	Saint Petersburg	25 February 1865	?	
1	Receipt of a downpayment from A. F. Bazunov	Saint Petersburg	9 March 1865	!	
1	A. E. Wrangel; Baron	Saint Petersburg	31 March – 14 April 1865	!	
2	O. Zhuravskaya	Saint Petersburg	1st half of April 1865	?	
1	N. P. Suslova; Physician	Saint Petersburg	19 April 1865	!	
1	N. P. Suslova; Physician	Saint Petersburg	19 April 1865	?	
1	A. V. Zimenko	Saint Petersburg	1st half of May 1865	?	
1	А. А. Suvorov; General-Governor of St. Petersburg	Saint Petersburg	10 May 1865	!	
1	Note to F. I. Gofman	Saint Petersburg	14 May 1865	!	
1	IOU to the Committee of the Society for Aid to Needy Writers and Scholars	Saint Petersburg	7 June 1865	!	
1	V. F. Korsh; Journalist, translator, literary historian	Saint Petersburg	June – early July 1865	?	
1	V. F. Korsh; Journalist, translator, literary historian	Saint Petersburg	around 5 June 1865	?	
1	A. A. Krayevsky; Journalist, founder of Notes of the Fatherland	Saint Petersburg	8 June 1865	!	
1	F. T. Stellovsky; Publisher, typographer	Saint Petersburg	1 July 1865	?	
1	N. N. Voskoboynnikov; Publisher	Wiesbaden	early August 1865	?	
1	A. E. Wrangel; Baron	Wiesbaden	early August 1865	?	
1	I. S. Turgenev; Writer	Wiesbaden	3 August 1865	!	
1	A. I. Herzen; Writer, philosopher, publisher	Wiesbaden	3 August 1865	?	
1	A. P. Suslova; Writer	Wiesbaden	10 August 1865	!	
1	A. P. Suslova; Writer	Wiesbaden	12 August 1865	!	
1	A. E. Wrangel; Baron	Wiesbaden	24 August 1865	!	
1	A. P. Milyukov; Critic, publisher	Wiesbaden	early September 1865	?	
1	M. N. Katkov; Journalist	Wiesbaden	10 – 15 September 1865	?	
1	M. N. Katkov; Journalist	Wiesbaden	10 – 15 September 1865	!	
1	A. E. Wrangel; Baron	Kronstadt	15 October 1865	?	
1	Editors of The Russian Messenger	Saint Petersburg	November – December 1865	?	
1	A. E. Wrangel; Baron	Saint Petersburg	8 November 1865	!	
1	A. V. Korvin-Krukovskaya; Socialist, feminist	Saint Petersburg	24 November 1865	?	
1	M. N. Katkov; Journalist	Saint Petersburg	December 1865	?	
1	V. F. Korsh; Journalist, translator, literary historian	Saint Petersburg	late December 1865	?	
1	M. N. Katkov; Journalist	Saint Petersburg	between 19 and 22 January 1866	?	
1	A. E. Wrangel; Baron	Saint Petersburg	18 February 1866	!	
1	N. Popov	Saint Petersburg	13 March 1866	?	
1	Court	Saint Petersburg	April 1866	?	
1	M. N. Katkov; Journalist	Saint Petersburg	25 April 1866	!	
1	A. V. Korvin-Krukovskaya; Socialist, feminist	Moscow	17 June 1866	!	
1	A. F. Bazunov; Publisher	Lyublino	4 July 1866	?	
1	V. A. Lyubimova; Artist	Lyublino	8 July 1866	!	
1	A. P. Milyukov; Critic, publisher	Lyublino	10 – 15 July 1866	!	
1	M. N. Katkov; Journalist	Lyublino	19 July 1866	!	
1	N. A. Lyubimov; Physicist	Saint Petersburg	2 November 1866	!	
1	N. A. Lyubimov; Physicist	Saint Petersburg	16 November 1866	!	
1	N. A. Lyubimov; Physicist	Saint Petersburg	9 December 1866	!	
1	N. A. Lyubimov; Physicist	Saint Petersburg	13 December 1866	!	
1	A. Y. Rizenkampf; Physician	Geneva	1867	?	
1	A. V. Korvin-Krukovskaya; Socialist, feminist	Saint Petersburg	January 1867	?	
1	A. G. Snitkina; Stenographer	Moscow	2 January 1867	!	
1	K. I. Babikov; Writer	Saint Petersburg	10 January 1867	?	
1	K. I. Babikov; Writer	Saint Petersburg	February 1867	?	
1	A. P. Milyukov; Critic, publisher	Saint Petersburg	13 February 1867	!	
2	A. S. Ushakov; Economist, dramaturg	Saint Petersburg	late February – March 1867	?	
1	A. P. Suslova; Writer	Dresden	23 April 1867	!	
1	A. G. Dostoyevskaya; Stenographer, second wife	Dresden	5 May 1867	!	
1	A. G. Dostoyevskaya; Stenographer, second wife	Bad Homburg	6 May 1867	!	
1	A. G. Dostoyevskaya; Stenographer, second wife	Bad Homburg	9 May 1867	!	
1	A. G. Dostoyevskaya; Stenographer, second wife	Bad Homburg	10 May 1867	!	
1	A. G. Dostoyevskaya; Stenographer, second wife	Bad Homburg	13 May 1867	!	
1	M. N. Katkov; Journalist	Dresden	17 May 1867	?	
1	M. N. Katkov; Journalist	Dresden	early June 1867	?	
1	M. N. Katkov; Journalist	Dresden	mid-July 1867	?	
1	A. G. Snitkina; Stenographer	Geneva	August – September 1867	?	
1	A. N. Maykov; Poet	Geneva	16 August 1867	!	
1	K. I. Babikov; Writer	Geneva	around 3 September 1867	?	
1	A. N. Maykov; Poet	Geneva	15 September 1867	!	
1	K. I. Babikov; Writer	Geneva	26 – 27 September 1867	?	
1	S. D. Yanovsky; Physician	Geneva	28 September 1867	?	
1	S. D. Yanovsky; Physician	Geneva	28 September 1867	!	
1	S. A. Ivanova; Niece	Geneva	29 September 1867	!	
1	F. M. Dostoyevsky	Geneva	11 October 1867	?	
1	S. D. Yanovsky; Physician	Geneva	1 – 2 November 1867	!	
1	S. D. Yanovsky; Physician	Geneva	1 – 2 November 1867	?	
1	M. N. Katkov; Journalist	Geneva	10 November 1867	?	
1	E. F. Dostoyevskaya	Geneva	December 1867	?	
1	M. N. Katkov; Journalist	Geneva	5 December 1867	?	
1	M. N. Katkov; Journalist	Geneva	24 December 1867	?	
1	A. N. Maykov; Poet	Geneva	31 December 1867	!	
1	F. M. Dostoyevsky	Geneva	early January 1868	?	
1	S. A. Ivanova; Niece	Geneva	1 January 1868	!	
1	M. N. Katkov; Journalist	Geneva	15 December 1868	?	
1	A. N. Maykov; Poet	Geneva	18 February 1868	!	
1	S. D. Yanovsky; Physician	Geneva	21 – 22 February 1868	?	
1	I. M. Alonkin; Trader	Geneva	March 1868	?	
1	My Explanation; Project	Geneva	March 1868	!	
1	A. N. Maykov; Poet	Geneva	21 – 22 March 1868	!	
1	A. G. Dostoyevskaya; Stenographer, second wife	Saxon les Bains	23 March 1868	!	
1	S. A. Ivanova; Niece	Geneva	29 March 1868	!	
1	M. N. Katkov; Journalist	Geneva	late March – early April 1868	?	
1	M. N. Katkov; Journalist	Geneva	early May 1868	?	
1	A. N. Maykov; Poet	Geneva	18 May 1868	!	
1	P. A. Isayev	Vevey	1st half of May 1868	?	
2	M. G. Gavrilov	Vevey	9 June 1868	?	
1	M. N. Katkov; Journalist	Vevey	21 June 1868	?	
1	A. N. Maykov; Poet	Vevey	22 June 1868	!	
1	A. N. Maykov; Poet	Vevey	21 July 1868	!	
1	I. M. Alonkin; Trader	Vevey	9 August 1868	?	
1	A foreign magazine's editor	Vevey	Late August – early September 1868	!	
1	E. F. Dostoyevskaya	Milan	September – October 1868	?	
1	M. N. Katkov; Journalist	Milan	October 1868	?	
1	A. N. Maykov; Poet	Milan	22 October 1868	!	
1	M. N. Katkov; Journalist	Florence	December 1868	?	
1	M. N. Katkov; Journalist	Florence	11 December 1868	?	
1	A. N. Maykov; Poet	Florence	11 December 1868	!	
1	N. N. Strakhov; Philosopher, publicist, literary critic	Florence	12 December 1868	!	
1	A. K. Petrov / O. Petrova; Priest / his wife	Florence	around 6 January 1869	?	
1	M. N. Katkov (or The Russian Messenger); Journalist	Florence	20 January 1869 (new style date)	?	
1	S. A. Ivanova; Niece	Florence	25 January 1869	!	
1	N. N. Strakhov; Philosopher, publicist, literary critic	Florence	26 February 1869	!	
1	S. A. Ivanova; Niece	Florence	8 March 1869	!	
1	N. N. Strakhov; Philosopher, publicist, literary critic	Florence	18 March 1869	!	
1	M. G. Svatkovskaya; Sister-in-law	Florence	early April 1869	?	
1	A. F. Bazunov; Publisher, bookseller	Florence	early April 1869	?	
1	N. N. Strakhov; Philosopher, publicist, literary critic	Florence	6 April 1869	!	
1	Editors of The Russian Messenger	Florence	early May 1869	?	
1	Dresden post office	Florence	early May 1869	?	
1	A. N. Maykov; Poet	Florence	15 May 1869	!	
1	Editors of The Russian Messenger	Dresden	29 August 1869	?	
1	V. V. Kashpirev; Founder of Zarya	Dresden	17 September 1869	?	
1	V. V. Kashpirev; Founder of Zarya	Dresden	27 September 1869	?	
1	Editors of The Russian Messenger	Dresden	October – November 1869	?	
1	V. V. Kashpirev; Founder of Zarya	Dresden	10 October 1869	?	
1	A. N. Maykov; Poet	Dresden	27 October 1869	!	
1	V. V. Kashpirev; Founder of Zarya	Dresden	mid-November 1869	?	
1	V. V. Kashpirev; Founder of Zarya	Dresden	6 December 1869	?	
1	P. A. Isayev	Dresden	10 December 1869	?	
1	V. M. Ivanova; Sister	Dresden	Around 14 December 1869	?	
1	S. D. Yanovsky; Physician	Dresden	1870	?	
1	N. A. Lyubimov; Physicist	Saint Petersburg	1870s	?	
1	M. N. Katkov; Journalist	Dresden	January – February 1870	?	
1	V. V. Kashpirev; Founder of Zarya	Dresden	30 January 1870	?	
1	V. V. Kashpirev; Founder of Zarya	Dresden	around 12 February 1870	?	
1	A. N. Maykov; Poet	Dresden	12 February 1870	!	
1	N. N. Strakhov; Philosopher, publicist, literary critic	Dresden	26 February 1870	!	
1	N. N. Strakhov; Philosopher, publicist, literary critic	Dresden	24 March 1870	!	
1	A. N. Maykov; Poet	Dresden	25 March 1870	!	
1	N. N. Strakhov; Philosopher, publicist, literary critic	Dresden	28 May 1870	!	
1	N. N. Strakhov; Philosopher, publicist, literary critic	Dresden	11 June 1870	!	
1	M. N. Katkov; Journalist	Dresden	8 October 1870	!	
1	A. N. Maykov; Poet	Dresden	9 October 1870	!	
1	N. N. Strakhov; Philosopher, publicist, literary critic	Dresden	9 October 1870	!	
1	А. М. GorchakovStatesman, diplomat	Dresden	13 November 1870	!	
1	Editors of The Russian Messenger	Dresden	December 1870 – early January 1871	?	
1	N. N. Strakhov; Philosopher, publicist, literary critic	Dresden	2 December 1870	!	
1	F. T. Stellovsky; Publisher, typographer	Dresden	between 15 and 30 December 1870	?	
1	A. N. Maykov; Poet	Dresden	30 December 1870	?	
1	Editors of The Russian Messenger	Dresden	5 January 1871	?	
1	P. I. Lamansky; Politician, Civil Councilor	Dresden	6 January 1871	?	
1	N. N. Strakhov; Philosopher, publicist, literary critic	Dresden	10 February 1871	!	
1	N. I. Solovyov; Physician, publisher, critic	Dresden	late February 1871	?	
1	Editors of The Russian Messenger	Dresden	late February – early March 1871	?	
1	A. N. Maykov; Poet	Dresden	2 March 1871	!	
1	N. N. Strakhov; Philosopher, publicist, literary critic	Dresden	18 March 1871	!	
1	A. G. Dostoyevskaya; Stenographer, second wife	Wiesbaden	16 April 1871	?	
1	M. N. Katkov; Journalist	Dresden	around 21 April 1871	?	
1	N. N. Strakhov; Philosopher, publicist, literary critic	Dresden	23 April 1871	!	
1	Penalty letter to V. I. Gubin; Advocate	Dresden	around 8 May 1871	?	
1	N. N. Strakhov; Philosopher, publicist, literary critic	Dresden	18 May 1871	!	
1	A. P. Milyukov; Critic, publisher	Saint Petersburg	mid-August 1871	?	
1	The Russian Messenger	Saint Petersburg	early September 1871	?	
1	A. A. Romanov; Future emperor	Saint Petersburg	autumn 1871 – 1st half of January 1872	?	
1	N. A. Lyubimov; Physicist	Saint Petersburg	mid-September 1871	?	
1	N. A. Lyubimov; Physicist	Saint Petersburg	late September 1871	?	
1	V. I. Gubin; Advocate	Saint Petersburg	29 October 1871	?	
1	A. F. Bazunov; Publisher	Saint Petersburg	25 November 1871	!	
1	V. M. Ivanova; Sister	Saint Petersburg	January 1872	?	
1	V. D. Obolenskaya; Princess	Saint Petersburg	20 January 1872	!	
1	N. A. Lyubimov; Physicist	Saint Petersburg	early March 1872	?	
1	N. A. Lyubimov; Physicist	Saint Petersburg	Late March – early April 1872	!	
1	P. M. Tretyakov; Physicist	Saint Petersburg	1st half of April 1872	?	
1	N. A. Lyubimov; Physicist	Saint Petersburg	7 April 1872	?	
2	I. I. Rumyantsev; Priest	Saint Petersburg	(around 20–27) May 1872	?	
1	N. A. Lyubimov; Physicist	Staraya Russa	13–14 July 1872	?	
1	Administration for Literary Affairs (Note: Collaborative letter with State Councilor Vladimir Meshchersky and Court Councilor Grigory Gradovsky)	Saint Petersburg	15 December 1872	!	
1	Editorial Subscription	Saint Petersburg	15 December 1872	!	
1	F. T. Stellovsky; Publisher, typographer	Saint Petersburg	1873	!	
1	I. I. Bogdanov; Littérateur	Saint Petersburg	(x–4) February 1873	?	
1	V. V. Chekhovich	Saint Petersburg	between 7 and 11 February 1873	?	
1	A. A. Romanov; Future emperor	Saint Petersburg	10 February 1873	!	
1	P. A. Kozlov; Poet, translator	Saint Petersburg	around 20 February 1873	?	
1	M. P. Pogodin; Historian, journalist	Saint Petersburg	21 February 1873	!	
1	M. P. Pogodin; Historian, journalist	Saint Petersburg	26 February 1873	!	
1	A. A. Shklyarevsky; Writer	Saint Petersburg	early March 1873	?	
1	V. S. Glinka	Saint Petersburg	(x–27) March 1873	?	
1	B. B. Polyakov	Saint Petersburg	16 May 1873	!	
1	B. B. Polyakov	Saint Petersburg	(after 10) June 1873	?	
1	Agreement with E. S. Polyanskaya (Note: Collaborative letter with Mikhail Dostoyevsky)	Saint Petersburg	13 June 1873	!	
1	B. B. Polyakov	Saint Petersburg	20–21 June 1873	?	
1	A. G. Snitkina; Stenographer	Saint Petersburg	5 July 1873	?	
1	I. I. Rumyantsev; Priest	Saint Petersburg	6 July 1873	?	
1	D. D. Kishensky; Writer, dramaturg	Saint Petersburg	between 12 and 27 July 1873	?	
1	V. P. Meshchersky; Journalist, novelist	Saint Petersburg	between 20 and 23 July 1873	?	
1	V. P. Meshchersky; Journalist, novelist	Saint Petersburg	1st half of August 1873	?	
1	A. G. Dostoyevskaya; Stenographer, second wife	Saint Petersburg	16 August 1873	?	
1	E. A. Belov; Historian, pedagogue, journalist	Saint Petersburg	(around 20–23) August 1873	?	
1	V. P. Meshchersky; Journalist, novelist	Saint Petersburg	16 September 1873	?	
1	M. P. Fyodorov; Publisher, politician	Saint Petersburg	19 September 1873	!	
1	V. P. Meshchersky; Journalist, novelist	Saint Petersburg	4–6 October 1873	?	
1	V. I. Pribytkova; Spritist, writer	Saint Petersburg	(around 20–25) October 1873	?	
1	V. P. Meshchersky; Journalist, novelist	Saint Petersburg	3–4 November 1873	!	
1	M. N. Longinov; Littérateur, writer, poet, memoirist, bibliographer, literary historian, politician	Saint Petersburg	11 November 1873	!	
1	A decision made by writers, poets, artists and public figures regarding the publishing of the digest Potluck for the poor people of the Samara administrative district (Note: Collaborative letter with V. Gaevsky, A. Kraevsky, N. Nekrasov, A. Gradovsky, Nik. Mikhailovsky, P. Efremov, I. Goncharov, A. Maykov, N. Kurochkin, A. Pleshcheyev, V. Korsh, Ya. Grot, K. Pobedonostsev, Sollogub, А. Ostrovsky, A. Pogossky, N. Karazin, Ya. Polonsky, M. Mikeshin, A. Nikitenko, I. Gorbunov, N. Solovyev, N. Leskov, T. Fillipov, V. Meshchersky, N. Gerbel, M. Stasyulevich, B. Markevich)	Saint Petersburg	15–19 December 1873	!	
1	Chairman of the Committee of the Society of Littérateurs	?	11 January 1874	!	
1	Censorship Committee of St. Petersburg	Saint Petersburg	19 January 1874	!	
1	V. M. Kachenovsky; Writer, literatéur	Saint Petersburg	late January 1874	?	
1	A. F. Koni; Lawyer, judge	Saint Petersburg	February 1874	!	
1	I. A. Goncharov; Novelist	Saint Petersburg	between 11 and 14 February 1874	?	
1	A. Shuttenbach	Saint Petersburg	March 1874	?	
1	Administration for Literary Affairs	Saint Petersburg	13 March 1874	!	
1	Agreement with A. N. Snitkina; Mother-in-law	Saint Petersburg	19 March 1874	!	
1	Administration for Literary Affairs	Saint Petersburg	19 March 1874	!	
1	Administration for Literary Affairs (Note: Collaborative letter with Viktor Putsykovich)	Saint Petersburg	24 April 1874	!	
1	O. F. Sher / M. D. Stavrovsky / F. D. Stavrovsky (Note: Collaborative letter with A. M. Dostoyevsky, N. M. Dostoyevsky, M. M. Dostoyevsky (nephew), F. D. Dostoyevsky (nephew)); Aunt / engineers	Saint Petersburg	30 April 1874	!	
1	Agreement with B. B. Polyakov	Saint Petersburg	May 1874	!	
1	A. M. Dostoyevsky / V. I. Veselovsky; Brother / advocate	Saint Petersburg	9 May 1874	!	
1	I. L. Trishin	Saint Petersburg	June 1874	!	
1	A. G. Dostoyevskaya; Stenographer, second wife	Bad Ems	12 June 1874	!	
1	N. A. Nekrasov; Poet	Saint Petersburg	– 1 September decade of October 1874	?	
1	N. A. Nekrasov; Poet	Staraya Russa	20 October 1874	!	
1	P. Smirnov	Saint Petersburg	early (to 4) November 1874	?	
1	I. L. Trishin	Saint Petersburg	December 1874	!	
1	L. Gislyanzoni	?	1875–1876	?	
1	A. F. Pisemsky (Note: Collaborative letter with A. Maykov, L. Maykov, Meshchersky, Prakhov, Filippov, Poretsky, Belov, Putsikovich, Polonsky, Strakhov, Bychkov, Barsukov, Kashpirev, Goncahrov); Novelist	Saint Petersburg	18 January 1875	!	
1	A. G. Dostoyevskaya; Stenographer, second wife	Saint Petersburg	6 February 1875	!	
1	A. G. Dostoyevskaya; Stenographer, second wife	Saint Petersburg	9 February 1875	!	
1	A. G. Dostoyevskaya; Stenographer, second wife	Saint Petersburg	12 February 1875	!	
1	E. M. Gotsky-Danilovich; District police officer of Staraya Russa	Staraya Russa	21 April 1875	!	
1	N. A. Nekrasov; Poet	Staraya Russa	27–28 April 1875	?	
1	A. G. Dostoyevskaya; Stenographer, second wife	Saint Petersburg	24 May 1875	!	
1	S. A. Ivanova; Niece	Saint Petersburg	1st half of June 1875	?	
1	S. A. Ivanova; Niece	Bad Ems	5 June 1875	?	
1	A. G. Dostoyevskaya; Stenographer, second wife	Bad Ems	10 June 1875	!	
1	Editors of Notes of the Fatherland	Bad Ems	21 June 1875	?	
1	N. A. Nekrasov; Poet	Bad Ems	21 June 1875	?	
1	Chancellery of the Novgorod Governor	Staraya Russa	31 July 1875	!	
1	A. N. Pleshcheyev; Poet	Staraya Russa	21 August 1875	!	
1	Agreement with P. E. Kekhribardzhi on the first independent publishing of the novel A Raw Youth	Saint Petersburg	8 November 1875	!	
1	N. A. Nekrasov; Poet	Saint Petersburg	Around 1 December 1875	?	
1	Administration for Literary Affairs	Saint Petersburg	22 December 1875	!	
1	The Kharkov Government News	Saint Petersburg	January 1876	!	
1	Editors of Caucasian Governmental Record	Saint Petersburg	1st half of January 1876	?	
1	I. R. Trishin; Usurer	Saint Petersburg	6 January 1876	!	
1	N. P. Semenov; Literatéur	Saint Petersburg	15 January 1876	?	
1	M. O. Wolff's book store	Saint Petersburg	19 January 1876	!	
1	Y. P. Polonsky; Poet	Saint Petersburg	4 February 1876	!	
1	D. I. Titov; Poet	Saint Petersburg	around 12 March 1876	?	
1	V. P. Meshchersky; Journalist, novelist	Saint Petersburg	around 24 March 1876	?	
1	K. D. Alchevskaya; Pedagogue	Saint Petersburg	9 April 1876	!	
1	S. E. Lurie; Translator, correspondent	Saint Petersburg	16 April 1876	!	
1	N. E. Lebedev	Saint Petersburg	29 May 1876	?	
1	V. A. Alekseyev; Philologist	Saint Petersburg	7 June 1876	!	
1	P. N. Polev	Staraya Russa	18 June 1876	?	
1	A. G. Dostoyevskaya; Stenographer, second wife	Bad Ems	12 July 1876	?	
1	A. G. Dostoyevskaya; Stenographer, second wife	Bad Ems	15 July 1876	!	
1	V. S. Solovyov; Novelist	Bad Ems	16 July 1876	!	
1	A. G. Dostoyevskaya; Stenographer, second wife	Bad Ems	21 July 1876	!	
1	L. V. Golovina; Follower of Rasputin	Bad Ems	23 July 1876	!	
1	K. P. Pechatkin; Publisher, book seller, creditor	Staraya Russa	mid-August 1876	?	
1	V. A. Savostyanova; Nice	Saint Petersburg	6 September 1876	?	
1	Committee on the Organization of a Musical and Dancing Evening at the Meeting of Artists in Petersburg for Students of the Medical-Surgical Academy on 2 December 1876	Saint Petersburg	November 1876	!	
1	K. I. Maslyannikov	Saint Petersburg	5 November 1876	!	
1	V. A. Fausek; Zoologist, entomologist, women's educational rights fighter	Saint Petersburg	11–12 November 1876	?	
1	A. P. Korba	Saint Petersburg	16–20 November 1876	?	
1	A. I. Normansky	Saint Petersburg	around 19 November 1876	?	
1	A. G. Dostoyevskaya; Stenographer, second wife	Saint Petersburg	16 December 1876	!	
1	O. A. Antipov	Saint Petersburg	2nd half of January 1877	?	
1	K. V. Nazareva; Author of children's literature	Saint Petersburg	4–6 February 1877	?	
1	K. V. Nazareva; Writer	Saint Petersburg	mid-February 1877	?	
1	Administration for Literary Affairs	Saint Petersburg	26 January 1877	!	
1	Administration for Literary Affairs	Saint Petersburg	21 February 1877	!	
1	B. B. Polyakov; Advocate	Saint Petersburg	early March 1877	!	
1	S. K. Govorov	Saint Petersburg	March – April 1877	?	
1	A. F. Gerasimova	Saint Petersburg	7 March 1877	!	
1	S. E. Lurie; Translator, correspondent	Saint Petersburg	11 March 1877	!	
1	V. K. Stukalich	Saint Petersburg	mid-March 1877	?	
1	N. S. Drentel	Saint Petersburg	2nd half of March 1877	?	
1	S. I. Pomerantseva	Saint Petersburg	2nd half of March 1877	?	
1	A. E. Gorn; Journalist	Saint Petersburg	late March – early April 1877	?	
1	V. N. Andreyev; Actor, writer	Saint Petersburg	mid- – 2 April half of April 1877	?	
1	S. E. Lurie; Translator, correspondent	Saint Petersburg	17 April 1877	!	
1	S. E. Lurie; Translator, correspondent	Saint Petersburg	May 1877	?	
1	A. G. Dostoyevskaya; Stenographer, second wife	Saint Petersburg	6 July 1877	!	
1	A. G. Dostoyevskaya; Stenographer, second wife	Saint Petersburg	9 July 1877	?	
1	A. G. Dostoyevskaya; Stenographer, second wife	Saint Petersburg	15 – 16 July 1877	!	
1	E. P. Pechatkin / K. P. Pechatkin / V. P. Pechatkin; Publishers, book sellers, creditors	Maly Prikol	1st half of August – mid-August 1877	?	
1	S. E. Lurie; Translator, correspondent	Maly Prikol	late August 1877	?	
1	K. S. Konstantinov	Saint Petersburg	mid-October 1877	?	
1	V. M. Ivanova; Sister	Saint Petersburg	around 20 October 1877	?	
1	A. V. Lokhvitsky; Lawyer, journalist	Saint Petersburg	late October 1877	?	
1	L. Tsepelin	Saint Petersburg	November 1877	?	
1	D. V. Averkiyev; Playwright, writer, theatrical critic, translator	Saint Petersburg	5 November 1877	!	
1	D. V. Averkiyev; Playwright, writer, theatrical critic, translator	Saint Petersburg	18 November 1877	!	
1	N. Y. Kapustina; Writer	Saint Petersburg	2nd half of November 1877	?	
1	B. B. Polyakov; Advocate	Saint Petersburg	1878	!	
1	A. Shults	Saint Petersburg	late January 1878	?	
1	N. L. Ozmidov; Writer	Saint Petersburg	February 1878	!	
1	V. V. Mikhailov	Saint Petersburg	16 March 1878	!	
1	N. P. Peterson; Pedagogue	Saint Petersburg	24 March 1878	!	
1	Unknown	Saint Petersburg	27 March 1878	!	
1	E. About; Novelist, publicist, journalist (Note: In French)	Saint Petersburg	2 April 1878	!	
1	F. F. Radetsky; Soldier	Saint Petersburg	16 April 1878	!	
1	A. P. Filosofova; Feminist	Saint Petersburg	8 May 1878	!	
1	A. K. Detengof	Saint Petersburg	mid-May 1878	?	
1	N. M. Dostoyevsky; Brother	Saint Petersburg	16 May 1878	!	
1	P. A. Isayev	Saint Petersburg	16 May 1878	!	
1	A. K. Detengof	Saint Petersburg	late May – early June 1878	?	
1	Y. D. Zasetskaya; Translator	Saint Petersburg	1st half of June 1878	?	
1	Y. I. Wolfram; Book seller	Staraya Russa	7 June 1878	!	
1	A. G. Dostoyevskaya; Stenographer, second wife	Moscow	20 – 21 June 1878	!	
1	A. G. Dostoyevskaya; Stenographer, second wife	Moscow	22 June 1878	!	
1	A. G. Dostoyevskaya; Stenographer, second wife	Moscow	29 June 1878	!	
1	G. M. Alfimova	Staraya Russa	late June 1878	?	
1	V. D. Sher; Second cousin	Staraya Russa	July 1878	!	
1	S. A. Yuryev; Writer, actor	Staraya Russa	11 July 1878	!	
1	P. A. Alfimov / G. M. Alfimova	Staraya Russa	around 14 July 1878	?	
1	N. N. Beketov; Chemist, metallurgist, professor	Staraya Russa	1st half of August 1878	?	
1	F. D. Weber	Staraya Russa	17–23 August 1878	?	
1	I. R. Trishin; Usurer	Staraya Russa	27 August 1878	?	
1	Y. D. Zasetskaya; Translator	Staraya Russa	early September 1878	?	
1	A. G. Dostoyevskaya; Stenographer, second wife	Moscow	9 November 1878	!	
1	A. G. Dostoyevskaya; Stenographer, second wife	Moscow	10 November 1878	!	
1	O. A. Levkovich	Saint Petersburg	March 1879	?	
1	L. S. Makov; Minister of Internal Affairs	Saint Petersburg	March 1879	!	
1	A. E. Zurov; Mayor of St. Petersburg	Saint Petersburg	3 March 1879	?	
1	V. P. Gayevsky; Critic, literary historian	Saint Petersburg	10 March 1879	!	
1	V. F. Putsykovich; Writer, journalist	Saint Petersburg	12 March 1879	!	
1	K. K. Romanov; Grand Duke	Saint Petersburg	15 March 1879	!	
1	S. D. Konstant; Sister-in-law (sister of first wife)	Saint Petersburg	9–10 April 1879	?	
1	N. A. Lyubimov; Physicist	Staraya Russa	10 May 1879	!	
1	S. E. Gurovich; Student, translator	Staraya Russa	2nd half of May 1879	?	
1	К. P. Pobedonostsev; Jurist, statesman, religious supervisor, Tsarist adviser	Staraya Russa	19 May 1879	!	
1	N. A. Lyubimov; Physicist	Staraya Russa	25 May 1879	!	
1	S. E. Gurovich; Student, translator	Staraya Russa	June 1879	?	
1	N. A. Lyubimov; Physicist	Staraya Russa	11 June 1879	!	
1	Е. А. Stackenschneider; Littérateur, daughter of Andrei Stackenschneider	Staraya Russa	15 June 1879	!	
1	F. Thomon; President of the National Literary Association	Staraya Russa	Early July 1879	!	
1	A. P. Filosofova; Feminist	Staraya Russa	11 July 1879	!	
1	N. A. Lyubimov; Physicist	Bad Ems	7 August 1879	!	
1	A. G. Dostoyevskaya; Stenographer, second wife	Bad Ems	13 August 1879	!	
1	К. P. Pobedonostsev; Jurist, statesman, religious supervisor, Tsarist adviser	Bad Ems	24 August 1879	!	
1	Agreement between the relatives of А. F. Kumanina (Note: Collaborative letter with Aleksandr Dostoyevsky, Mikhail Dostoyevsky)	Saint Petersburg	November 1879	!	
1	N. A. Lyubimov; Physicist	Saint Petersburg	16 November 1879	!	
1	N. A. Ivanova; Niece	Saint Petersburg	(after 22) November 1879	?	
1	N. A. Lyubimov; Physicist	Saint Petersburg	(after 22) November 1879	?	
1	N. A. Lyubimov; Physicist	Saint Petersburg	late 1879 – 1st days of January 1880	?	
1	V. V. Samoylov; Actor	Saint Petersburg	17 December 1879	!	
1	A. N. Kurnosova	Saint Petersburg	15 January 1880	!	
1	N. A. Lyubimov; Physicist	Saint Petersburg	29 January 1880	?	
1	P. I. Veinberg; Poet, translator, journalist, historian	Saint Petersburg	5 March 1880	?	
1	P. I. Veinberg; Poet, translator, journalist, historian	Saint Petersburg	between 6 and 10 March 1880	?	
1	I. F. Gorbunov (Note: Collaborative letter with Miller)	Saint Petersburg	28 March 1880	!	
1	Agreement on the Ryzansk Estate	Saint Petersburg	30 March 1880	!	
1	E. Richter	Saint Petersburg	April 1880	?	
1	Excuse to the Magistrate	Saint Petersburg	April 1880	!	
1	E. F. Junge; Artist, cousin of Leo Tolstoy, daughter of sculptor Fyodor Tolstoy	Saint Petersburg	11 April 1880	!	
1	A. S. Suvorin; Publisher, journalist	Staraya Russa	14 May 1880	!	
1	A. G. Dostoyevskaya; Stenographer, second wife	Moscow	23 – 24 May 1880	!	
1	A. G. Dostoyevskaya; Stenographer, second wife	Moscow	25 May 1880	!	
1	A. G. Dostoyevskaya; Stenographer, second wife	Moscow	26 May 1880	!	
1	A. G. Dostoyevskaya; Stenographer, second wife	Moscow	27 May 1880	!	
1	A. G. Dostoyevskaya; Stenographer, second wife	Moscow	28 May 1880	!	
1	A. G. Dostoyevskaya; Stenographer, second wife	Moscow	29 May 1880	!	
1	A. G. Dostoyevskaya; Stenographer, second wife	Moscow	30 – 31 May 1880	!	
1	Moscow State Duma	Moscow	June 1880	!	
1	A. G. Dostoyevskaya; Stenographer, second wife	Moscow	1 June 1880	!	
1	A. G. Dostoyevskaya; Stenographer, second wife	Moscow	3 June 1880	!	
1	A. G. Dostoyevskaya; Stenographer, second wife	Moscow	4 June 1880	!	
1	A. G. Dostoyevskaya; Stenographer, second wife	Moscow	5 June 1880	!	
1	A. G. Dostoyevskaya; Stenographer, second wife	Moscow	7 June 1880	!	
1	A. G. Dostoyevskaya; Stenographer, second wife	Moscow	8 June 1880	!	
1	K. A. Islavin	Staraya Russa	11 June 1880	?	
1	S. A. Tolstaya; Wife of Leo Tolstoy	Staraya Russa	13 June 1880	!	
1	Е. А. Stackenschneider; Littérateur, daughter of Andrei Stackenschneider	Staraya Russa	17 July 1880	!	
1	S. A. Yuryev; Critic, translator, journalist	Staraya Russa	late June – first half of July 1880	?	
1	E. N. Geiden; Baroness	Staraya Russa	2nd half of July – early August 1880	?	
1	N. A. Lyubimov; Physicist	Staraya Russa	10 August 1880	!	
1	A. G. Dostoyevskaya; Stenographer, second wife	Staraya Russa	11 August 1880	!	
1	M. A. Polivanova; Wife of pedagogue Leo Polivanov	Staraya Russa	16 August 1880	!	
1	N. L. Ozmidov; Writer	Staraya Russa	18 August 1880	!	
1	I. S. Aksakov; Littérateur	Staraya Russa	28 August 1880	!	
1	N. A. Lyubimov; Physicist	Staraya Russa	8 September 1880	!	
1	Administration for Literary Affairs	Saint Petersburg	25 October 1880	!	
1	S. G. Rekhnevsky	Saint Petersburg	(after 27) October 1880	?	
1	N. A. Lyubimov; Physicist	Saint Petersburg	8 November 1880	!	
1	V. M. Karepina; Sister	Saint Petersburg	around 4 December 1880	?	
1	К. P. Pobedonostsev; Jurist, statesman, religious supervisor, Tsarist adviser	Saint Petersburg	9 December 1880	?	
1	P. I. Veinberg; Poet, translator, journalist, historian	Saint Petersburg	(x–14) December 1880	?	
1	E. S. Polyanskaya	Saint Petersburg	(x–15) December 1880	?	
1	E. S. Polyanskaya	Saint Petersburg	16–17 December 1880	?	
1	P. G. Kuznetsov; Book seller	Saint Petersburg	3 January 1881	!	
1	A. A. Tolstaya; Great aunt of Leo Tolstoy	Saint Petersburg	5 January 1881	!	
1	N. A. Lyubimov; Physicist	Saint Petersburg	26 January 1881	!	
1	E. N. Geiden; Baroness	Saint Petersburg	28 January 1881	!	
