= Dostoevskaya =

Dostoyevskaya may refer to:

- Dostoyevskaya (Saint Petersburg Metro)
- Dostoevskaya (Moscow Metro)

== People with the surname ==
- Anna Dostoevskaya, the second wife of writer Fyodor Dostoyevsky
- Lyubov Dostoevskaya, second daughter of Fyodor Dostoyevsky and Anna Snitkina

== See also ==
- Dostoevsky (surname)
