= Dostoevsky (surname) =

Dostoevsky (Russian: Достоевский) is a Belarusian toponymic surname referring to a person from the Belarusian village Dostoyevo. The feminine form is Dostoevskaya. Notable people with the surname include:

- Fyodor Dostoevsky (1821–1881), Russian writer and essayist
- Anna Dostoevskaya, second wife of Fyodor
- Andrey Dostoevsky (1825–1897), Fyodor's brother, an architect
- Lyubov Dostoevskaya, second daughter of Fyodor
- Mikhail Dostoevsky (1820–1864), Fyodor's brother, short story writer and publisher

== See also ==
- MS Fyodor Dostoevsky, the cruise ship
- L. Tolstoy and Dostoyevsky, an essay by Dmitry Merezhkovsky
