= Twenty Six Days from the Life of Dostoyevsky =

1981 film

- Film poster
- Directed by: Aleksandr Zarkhi
- Written by: Pavel Finn; Vladimir Vajnshtok
- Starring: Anatoly Solonitsyn; Yevgeniya Simonova
- Cinematography: Vladimir Klimov
- Music by: Irakli Gabeli (ru)
- Production company: Mosfilm
- Release date: 2 February 1981
- Running time: 87 minutes
- Country: Soviet Union
- Language: Russian

Twenty Six Days from the Life of Dostoyevsky (Russian: Двадцать шесть дней из жизни Достоевского, romanized: Dvadtsat shest dney iz zhizni Dostoevskogo) is a 1981 Soviet biographical film about writer Fyodor Dostoevsky directed by Aleksandr Zarkhi. It was entered into the 31st Berlin International Film Festival where Anatoly Solonitsyn won the Silver Bear for Best Actor.

== Plot ==
The film is set in October 1866. Dostoyevski is experiencing a hard and dark period in his life, including his wife's funeral, then his brother's, debts and an unsettled personal life. He signs a leonine contract with the publisher Stellovsky which dictates that in a short time he needs to provide the manuscript of his new novel.

On the advice of his friends, Fyodor uses services of a stenographer, one of the best course trainees of Olkhin.

For the little time that was given to him, the novel The Gambler was completed. A gentle, sincere feeling that arose between the writer and his assistant, grows into love. Anna, having overcome doubt, becomes his wife and loyal friend.

== Cast ==
- Anatoly Solonitsyn as Fyodor Mikhailovich Dostoyevsky
- Yevgeniya Simonova as Anna Grigoryevna Snitkina
- Ewa Szykulska as Appolinariya Suslova
- Nikolai Denisov as Misha
- Yevgeni Dvorzhetsky as Pasha Isaev, Dostoevsky's stepson
- Yuri Katin-Yartsev as office worker
