= Polina Suslova =

Russian writer (1839–1918)

- Полина Суслова
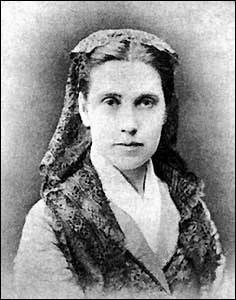
- Suslova, c. 1890
- Born: Apollinaria Prokofyevna Suslova (Аполлинария Прокофьевна Суслова); 1839; Panino, Nizhny Novgorod Governorate
- Died: 1918 (aged 78–79); Sevastopol
- Education: Saint Petersburg State University
- Occupation: Writer
- Spouse: Vasily Rozanov (m. 1880)
- Partner: Fyodor Dostoyevsky

Apollinaria Prokofyevna Suslova (Russian: Аполлинария Прокофьевна Суслова; 1839–1918), commonly known as Polina Suslova (Полина Суслова), was a Russian short story writer, who is perhaps best known as a mistress of writer Fyodor Dostoyevsky, wife of Vasily Rozanov and a sister of Russia's first female physician Nadezhda Suslova. She is considered to be the prototype of several female characters in Dostoyevsky's novels, such as Polina in The Gambler, Nastasya Filipovna in The Idiot, Katerina Ivanovna Marmeladova in Crime and Punishment, Lizaveta Nikolaevna in Demons, and both Katerina and Grushenka in The Brothers Karamazov. Suslova has often been portrayed as a femme fatale. Dostoyevsky called her one of the most remarkable women of his time.

Her own works include a short story Pokuda, published in Mikhail Dostoyevsky's Vremya magazine in 1861, Do svadby (1863), and the autobiographical Chuzhaya i Svoy, published in 1928.

== Early life ==
Polina Suslova was born in Panino, Nizhny Novgorod guberniya. Polina's father, Prokofiy Suslov, was a serf of the Sheremetevs, but was able to succeed as a merchant and manufacturer. He decided to provide proper education for his daughters, Polina (a diminutive form of the given name Apollinaria) and Nadezhda. The girls had a governess, and a dancing teacher.

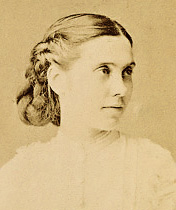
Suslova in 1867

Polina attended a finishing school, and when the Suslov family moved to Saint Petersburg, she attended the Saint Petersburg State University. She enjoyed the political struggle, the demonstrations, and students' meetings. She was sympathetic to the radical views of that time, especially regarding women rights.

Lyubov Dostoyevskaya in Dostoyevsky as Portrayed by His Daughter described her as a young provincial woman, whose "rich relatives were able to send her enough money to live comfortably in Saint Petersburg. Every autumn she entered the University as a student, but she never actually studied or passed any exams. However, she attended lectures, flirted with the students, … made them sign petitions, participated in all political demonstrations, … sang La Marseillaise, scolded the Cossacks and behaved provocatively."

== Relationship with Fyodor Dostoyevsky ==
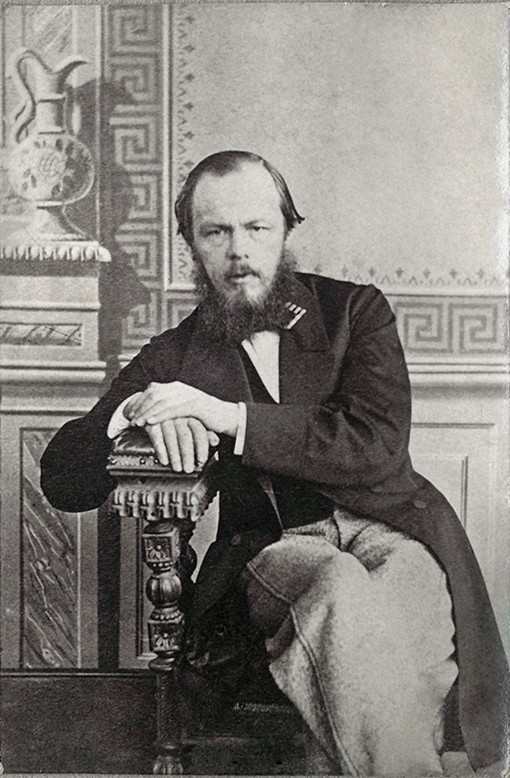
Fyodor Dostoyevsky in 1863

In 1861, Suslova attended the classes taught by Fyodor Dostoyevsky, already a renowned writer, whose lectures were very popular among young people. At that time, Dostoyevsky was 40, and she was 21. Daughter Lyubov Dostoyevskaya (who was born several years later, well after the affair had come to an end) opined that Suslova "spun around Dostoevsky and tried to please him in every way, but Dostoevsky did not notice her. Then she wrote him a love letter". Another version is that Suslova brought her writings to Dostoyevsky and asked for advice. Her story was bad, but Dostoyevsky was attracted to a beautiful young girl and promised to teach her writing. Yet another explanation is that Dostoyevsky had read Suslova's story, liked it and wanted to meet the author.

The relationship was difficult and painful for both sides, but mostly for Dostoyevsky. He was exhausted by work, poor health, and increasing financial distress. Suslova was imperious, manipulative, jealous, and she constantly demanded that he divorce his "consumptive wife" Maria Isayeva. Dostoyevsky later noted that she was "a sick selfish woman", whose "selfishness and self-esteem were colossal" and who did not tolerate any imperfection in other people. After Maria's death in 1865, he proposed to Suslova, but she declined.

Unlike Dostoyevsky's second wife Anna Snitkina, Polina Suslova rarely read his books, did not respect his work, and regarded him as a simple admirer. Dostoyevsky wrote her once: "My dear, I am not inviting you to a cheap essential happiness." After their breakup, she burned the compromising papers, including their letters. In 1867, Fyodor Dostoyevsky married Anna Snitkina.

== Later life ==
Vasily Rozanov met Suslova when he was a schoolboy, and she was already over thirty years old. He fell in love at first sight. Rozanov had known her as the former mistress of Fyodor Dostoyevsky. It was enough to spark his interest, because Dostoyevsky was the writer whom Rozanov admired most. Rozanov made only a brief entry in his diary: "Meeting Apollinaria Prokofyevna Suslova. My love for her. Suslova loves me, and I love her very much. She is the most wonderful woman I've ever met." They had an affair for three years, and married in November 1880. She was 40 at that time, and he was 24.

They parted in 1886. Their life together was a torture for Rozanov, as evident from his personal correspondence. Suslova made public scenes of jealousy and flirted with his friends at the same time. Rozanov's daughter, Tatyana, stated in her memoirs: "Suslova mocked him, saying that what he was writing were just some stupid books, she insulted him, and finally dumped him". Suslova broke up with Rozanov twice, but he always forgave her and begged to return home. After they finally parted, Rozanov admitted: "There was something brilliant (in her temperament) that made me love her blindly and timidly despite all the suffering."

After Rozanov met his future wife, Varvara, Polina refused to divorce him for 20 years.

Beginning in the early 1900s, Polina Suslova lived alone in Sevastopol. She died in 1918 at the age of 78.

== See also ==
Media related to Polina Suslova at Wikimedia Commons
