= Grazhdanin =

Russian magazine (1872–1914)

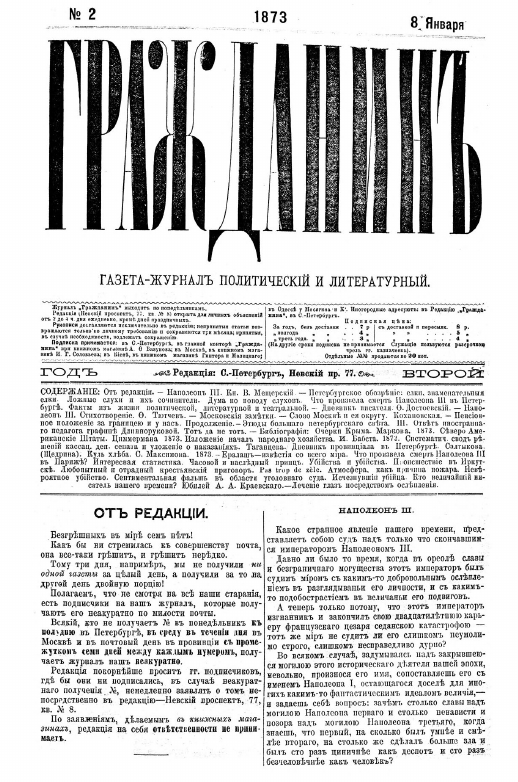
Гражданин

Grazhdanin (Russian: Гражданинъ, lit. The Citizen) was a Russian conservative political and literary magazine published in Petersburg in 1872–1914 (with a one-year interval in 1880–1881). The magazine was founded by Prince Vladimir Meshchersky. It came out weekly or two times a week, and daily in 1887–1914. Grazhdanin exerted some influence on policies of the Russian government. It adhered to principals of monarchism and opposed liberal press and revolutionary movements. Fyodor Dostoyevsky was the magazine's chief editor from the early 1873 to April 1874. Throughout this magazine's existence, people like Konstantin Pobedonostsev, Nikolay Strakhov, Aleksey Pisemsky, Nikolai Leskov, Fyodor Tyutchev, Apollon Maykov, Yakov Polonsky, Aleksey Apukhtin, Vasily Nemirovich-Danchenko and others published their works on its pages.
