= The Beggar Boy at Christ's Christmas Tree =

1876 short story written by Fyodor Dostoevsky

- Short story by Fyodor Dostoevsky
- Original title: Мальчик у Христа на ёлке

Publication
- Published in: A Writer's Diary
- Publication date: January 1876

"The Beggar Boy at Christ's Christmas Tree" (Russian: Мальчик у Христа на ёлке; Mal'chik u Khrista na yolke) is a Christmas-time short story written by Russian author Fyodor Dostoevsky in 1876. It was first published in A Writer's Diary, January 1876. This story is also known as "The Heavenly Christmas Tree".

== Creation ==
On December 26, 1875, Fyodor Dostoevsky and his daughter Aimée attended a children's ball and a Christmas tree held at the St. Petersburg Artists' Club. On December 27, Dostoevsky and Anatoly Koni arrived at the Colony for Juvenile Delinquents on the Okhta (outskirts of St. Petersburg at that time) headed by the famous teacher and writer Pavel Rovinsky. On the same New Year's Eve, he met several times a beggar boy asking for alms ("a boy with a hand", Russian: Мальчик с ручкой) on the streets of St. Petersburg. All these New Year's impressions formed the basis of the Christmas (or Yule) story "The Beggar Boy at Christ's Christmas Tree".

Dostoevsky began the story on December 30, 1875, and by the end of January, "The Beggar Boy at Christ's Christmas Tree" was published along with other materials about "Russian present-day children" in the January issue of A Writer's Diary. In the first issue of his renewed edition, Dostoevsky intended to tell his readers "something about children in general, about children with fathers, about children without fathers in particular, about children on Christmas trees, without Christmas trees, about criminal children...". The story "The Beggar Boy at Christ's Christmas Tree" in the "Writer's Diary" was preceded by a small chapter "The Boy with a Hand", and all the materials taken together from the first two chapters of the "Writer's Diary" (in the first chapter the writer placed his journalistic reflections on the same topic) were united by the theme of compassion for children.

== Synopsis ==
The author begins by telling us he has made this story up, but that even so, he thinks it must have actually happened—on Christmas Eve, in a great town, at a time of terrible frost.

The boy of the title, "six years old or younger," awakens in a frigid cellar, reaches for his mother, and finds she is "as cold as the wall." He makes his way outside. Apparently he has just arrived from a remote village; this is the first time he has ever experienced the bustling streets of a vibrant city—especially festive, as this is Christmas Eve.

He stops to view a lovely party, with children dancing. He notices how lovely a young girl looks. Then he moves on to witness another grand party, with even more children, and with many people going in. He boldly walks in himself, but the people inside "shouted at him and waved him back". A woman puts a kopek in his hand and hustles him out the door; his fingers are too cold to hold on to the coin, and he immediately drops it.

Next he stops to watch some astonishing puppets behind yet another window. The show delights him; but after a few moments an older child comes up from behind, hits him on the head, trips him, and steals his hat. The boy gets up and runs into someone's courtyard and sits next to a wood stack.

Suddenly, he feels warm and comfortable. He hears his mother singing, and a "small voice" invites him to come see a Christmas tree. And then he is at a great party indeed—and his mother is there, and other children who suffered similar fates, and their mothers too. He learns that this is "Christ's Christmas tree." The children run up to their weeping mothers and tell them not to cry, because everything is all right.

The next morning, the frozen bodies of both the child and his mother are found, and they are said to have met before the Lord God in Heaven.

The author returns and says he felt it was important to tell this story because he is convinced it must have really happened. But then he clarifies himself, and explains that he is only sure about the first part—and that he has no idea whether the incident about Christ's tree might be true or not.

== See also ==
- A Dog of Flanders, a similar novel by Ouida
- List of Christmas-themed literature
- "The Little Match Girl", a similar story by Hans Christian Andersen

== Sources ==
- "The Beggar Boy at Christ's Christmas Tree"
- St. Petersburg Times - Dec 25, 1975
