= Epoch (Russian magazine) =

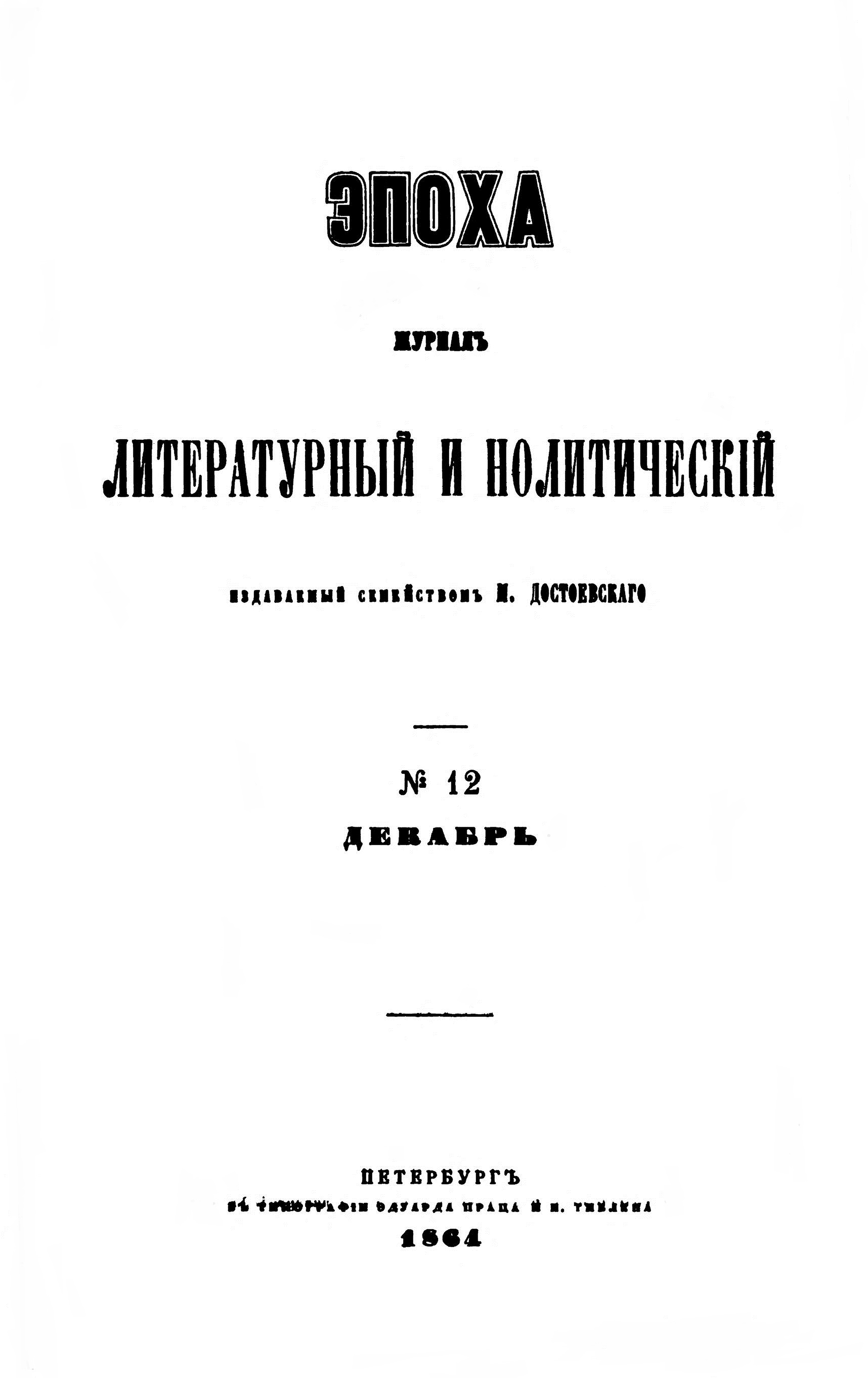
- Title page, 1864.
- Frequency: Monthly
- First issue: March 1864
- Final issue: 1865
- Country: Russian Empire
- Based in: St. Petersburg
- Language: Russian

Epoch (Russian: Эпо́ха, romanized: Epokha) was a Russian literary magazine published in 1864-65 by Fyodor Dostoyevsky and his brother Mikhail.

== Publication history ==
The first two combined numbers of Epoch, for January and February, 1864, were published in March, 1864, containing the opening chapters of Notes from Underground by Fyodor Dostoyevsky. Notes from Underground took up the first four issues of the magazine. His story The Crocodile was published in the last issue. The Crocodile, taken as an attack on Nikolay Chernyshevsky, and his article Mr -bov and the Question of Art, criticising the views of Nikolay Dobrolyubov, created considerable controversy between Dostoyevsky and Russian liberals.

After Mikhail Dostoyevsky's death in 1864, Fyodor became chief editor. He was forced to discontinue publication of the magazine in February 1865 due to financial problems.

Along with Dostoyevsky's works, Epoch published articles by Apollon Grigoryev and Nikolay Strakhov, stories by major writers such as Ivan Turgenev and Nikolai Leskov, and the popular fiction of Vsevolod Krestovsky and others.
