= Vasily Rozanov =

Russian writer and philosopher (1856–1919)

- Василий Розанов
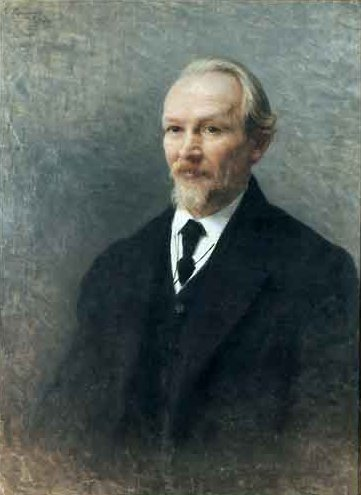
- Born: 2 May [O.S. 20 April] 1856; Vetluga, Russian Empire
- Died: 5 February 1919 (aged 62); Sergiyev Posad, Russian SFSR, Soviet Union

Philosophical work
- Era: 20th-century philosophy
- Region: Russian philosophy
- School: Christian philosophy; Russian symbolism
- Main interests: Philosophy of religion

Vasily Vasilievich Rozanov (Russian: Василий Васильевич Розанов; 2 May [O.S. 20 April] 1856 – 5 February 1919) was one of the most controversial Russian writers and a significant philosopher among the symbolists of the pre-revolutionary epoch.

== Views ==
Rozanov tried to reconcile Christian teachings with ideas of healthy sex and family life, but as his adversary Nikolai Berdyaev put it, he 'set up sex in opposition to the Word'. His interest in these matters, as in matters of religion, brought Rozanov close to Russian Symbolism. Because of references to the phallus in Rozanov's writings, Klaus von Beyme called him the Rasputin of the Russian intelligentsia.

Rozanov's mature works are personal diaries containing intimate thoughts, impromptu lines, unfinished maxims, vivid aphorisms, reminiscences, and short essays. In the loosely connected trilogy comprising Solitaria (1911) and the two volumes of Fallen Leaves (1913 and 1915), he attempted to recreate the intonations of speech.

Rozanov frequently referred to himself as Fyodor Dostoyevsky's 'Underground Man' and proclaimed his right to espouse contrary opinions at the same time. He first attracted attention in the 1890s when he published political sketches in the conservative newspaper Novoye Vremya ('New Time'), owned and run by Aleksey Suvorin. Rozanov's comments, always paradoxical and sparking controversy, led him into clashes with the Tsarist government and with radicals such as Lenin. For example, Rozanov readily passed from criticism of Russian Orthodoxy, and even of what he saw as the Christian preoccupation with death, to fervent praise of Christian faith, from praise of Judaism to unabashed Antisemitism, and from acceptance of homosexuality as yet another side of human nature to vitriolic accusations that Nikolai Gogol and some other writers had been latent homosexuals. He proclaimed that politics was 'obsolete' because 'God doesn't want politics any more'; constructed an 'apocalypse of our times'; and recommended the 'healthy instincts' of the Russian people, their longing for authority, and their hostility to modernism.

Rozanov starved to death in a monastery in the hungry years following the revolution. His work was suppressed and largely forgotten in the Soviet Union, but there were some prominent writers, including Maxim Gorky and Venedikt Erofeev, among his admirers, and his ideas are thought to have exercised an influence on Vladimir Nabokov's approach to the everyday world of existence (быт/byt) as utopian. Recently, however, his paradoxical writings have once again become available to Russian readers, and there has been somewhat of a resurgence among readers sympathetic to Rozanov's political views. Rozanov is the main source of inspiration for Dmitry Galkovsky's philosophical novel The Infinite Deadlock (1988), which revises 19th‑century Russian history and places Rozanov at the centre of Russian philosophical thought. Rozanov remains little known outside Russia, but some Western scholars have become increasingly fascinated by his work and his persona.

== Bibliography ==
- Legenda o velikom inkvizitore F.M. Dostoyevskogo (1894; Dostoevsky and the Legend of the Grand Inquisitor)
- Literaturnye ocherki (1899; 'Literary Essays')
- Sumerki prosvescheniya (1899; 'Twilight of Education')
- Semeyny vopros v Rossii (1903; 'The Family Question in Russia')
- Metafizika Khristianstva (1911; 'Metaphysics of Christianity'):
  Temnyi Lik ('Dark Representation of a Face')
  Liudi Lunnogo Sveta ('People of the Moonlight')
- Uyedinyonnoye (1912; Solitaria – 'Solitary Thoughts')
- Opavshiye listya (1913–15; Fallen Leaves)
- Apokalipsis nashego vremeni (1917–18; 'The Apocalypse of Our Time')

== See also ==
- Russian philosophy
- Polina Suslova
