= Vladimir Meshchersky =

Russian journalist and novelist (1839-1914)

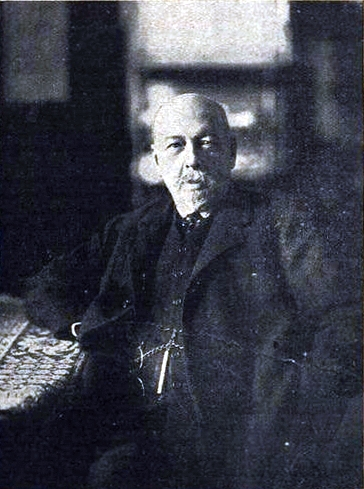
Prince Vladimir Meschersky

Prince Vladimir Petrovich Meshchersky (Russian: Влади́мир Петро́вич Меще́рский; 11 January 1839 – 23 July 1914) was a Russian journalist and novelist who, throughout his career, wielded significant political influence.

He was the grandson of historian Nikolay Karamzin.

A strong supporter of the role of the landed gentry in politics and administration, Meshchersky "turned politics into an industry with which he traded in the most shameless manner for the benefit of himself and his favourites" – young men whose careers he advanced. A friend of composer Pyotr Ilyich Tchaikovsky, he acquired a reputation as a homosexual philanderer. His patrons, the Tsars Alexander III and Nicholas II, protected him from public disgrace.

He was the editor of Grazhdanin (The Citizen), a traditional conservative newspaper which received subsidies from the imperial authorities. According to Leon Trotsky, "The sole paper which [Tsar] Nicholas read for years, and from which he derived his ideas, was a weekly published on state revenue by Prince Meshchersky, a vile, bribed journalist of the reactionary bureaucratic clique, despised even in his own circle."

Meshchersky also contributed to the periodicals The Russian Messenger and Moskovskiye Vedomosti (Moscow News). He was the author of several novels and memoirs.
