= Mikhail Dostoevsky =

Russian short story writer, publisher and literary critic

Mikhail Dostoyevsky
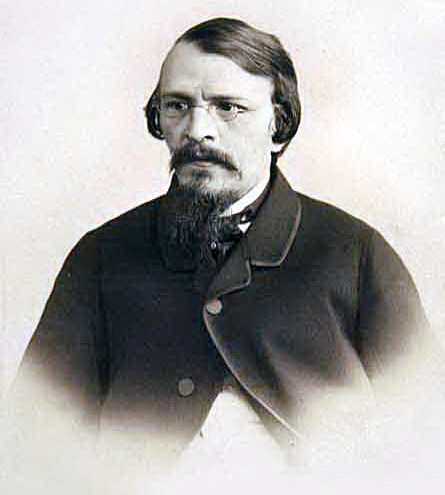
- Born: 25 November 1820; Moscow, Russian Empire
- Died: 22 July 1864 (aged 43); Saint Petersburg, Russian Empire
- Occupations: publisher, writer, translator, literary critic
- Relatives: Fyodor Dostoyevsky
- Writing career
- Period: 1848 to 1864
- Movements: Sentimentalism, Pochvennichestvo

Mikhail Mikhailovich Dostoevsky (Russian: Михаил Михайлович Достоевский; 25 November 1820 – 22 July 1864) was a Russian short story writer, publisher, literary critic and the elder brother of Fyodor Dostoevsky. They were less than a year apart in age and spent their childhood together.

== Biography ==
Mikhail Dostoevsky was born on 25 November 1820 in Moscow, where his father was a surgeon at the Mariinsky Hospital. Mikhail received a home education. He began to write poetry at the age of nine. In 1834 he was sent to the boarding school of L. Chermak, where he stayed until 1837. Then his father took him and his younger brother Fyodor to Saint Petersburg. He intended to enter the Petersburg's Academy of Engineering, but was not accepted because he was diagnosed with Tuberculosis after medical examinations.

In 1842 he married Emily von Ditmar with whom he had two sons, Fyodor and Mikhail, and three daughters, Catherine, Maria and Varvara. In 1849 he was arrested, along with his brother, because of his connections to the Petrashevsky Circle.

In 1861 he started a magazine titled Vremya (Russian: Время, lit. Time). Dostoevsky wanted to create a fresh independent publication—impartial, freestanding, sustainable, and not subservient to any authority. At the same time, it would appeal to common people and inspire the study of their lives and life principles. Mikhail Dostoevsky was convinced that all flaws in Russian society had come from "apathetic" cosmopolitanism.

Vremya became one of the most popular magazines in the early 1860s with approximately 4000 subscribers. Officially Mikhail was publisher and editor, but the editorial work was mostly borne by his brother, who worked as columnist, critic, essayist and writer all at once. Vremya was banned in April 1863 following the publication of an article by Nikolay Strakhov. In 1864 Dostoevsky established the magazine Epokha (Epoch). On 19 July 1864, under the strain of financial obligations arising with the magazine, and suffering from a liver ailment, Mikhail collapsed after hearing that an important article was rejected by the censorship. Three days later, at the age of 43, he died.

Fyodor Dostoevsky recalled his brother as a persistent, hard-working and energetic man, "a connoisseur of European languages and literature", and a harsh critic of his own writing. According to Fyodor, Mikhail did not consider himself an accomplished writer, and for that reason he stopped writing fiction and concentrated on publishing activities. They were close friends.

== Works ==
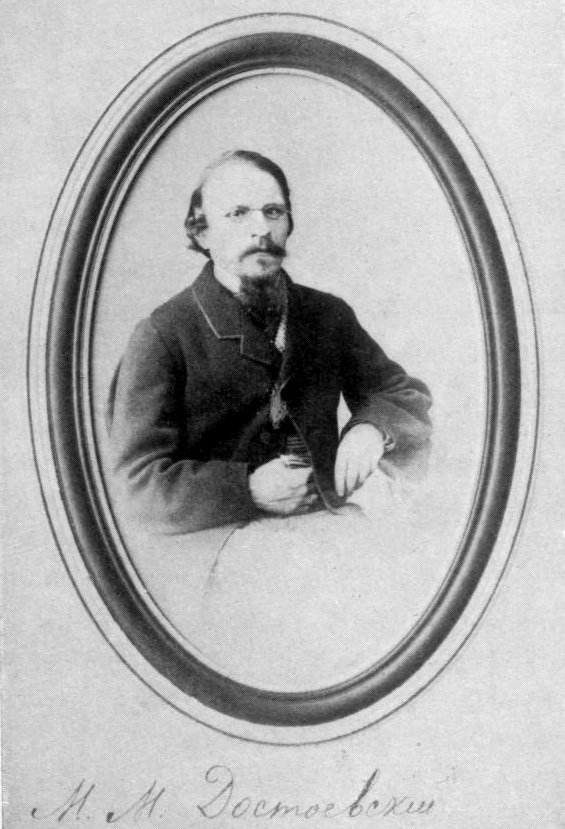
Mikhail Dostoyevsky.

In the 1840s Mikhail Dostoevsky's short stories were published in Notes of the Fatherland:

- A Daughter (Дочка; 1848)
- Mr. Svetelkin (Господин Светелкин; 1848)
- Sparrow (Воробей; 1848)
- Two Old Men (Два старичка; 1849)
- Fifty Years (Пятьдесят лет; 1850)
- The Older and the Younger (Старшая и меньшая, 1851)

He translated many European literature classics, including Goethe's Reineke Fuchs and Schiller's Don Carlos.
