= Nikolay Strakhov =

Russian philosopher (1828–1896)

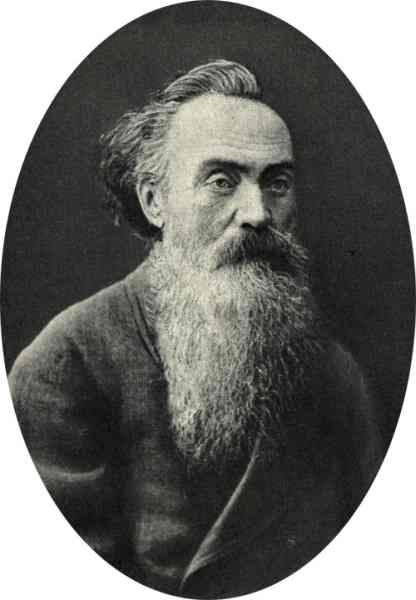
Nikolay Nikolayevich Strakhov

Nikolay Nikolayevich Strakhov, also transliterated as Nikolai Strahov (Russian: Никола́й Никола́евич Стра́хов; 16 October 1828 – 24 January 1896) was a Russian philosopher, publicist, journalist and literary critic. He shared the ideals of Pochvennichestvo and was a longtime friend and correspondent of Leo Tolstoy.

Strakhov was born in Belgorod, Kursk Governorate in a priest family. After leaving St Petersburg University (unable to afford the fees), in 1851 Strakhov graduated from Saint Petersburg's Main Pedagogical Institute, after which he taught for one year in Odessa, followed by nine years' teaching at a gymnasium in Saint Petersburg. In 1861, Strakhov became a prominent publicist and literary critic. Strakhov worked on the literary journals Time and Epoch together with Fyodor Dostoyevsky and Apollon Grigoryev. He became one of the very few close friends of Leo Tolstoy.

In the 1870s Nikolay Strakhov wrote his most famous philosophical work World as a Whole and was among the first (if not the first) to recognize Tolstoy's War and Peace as one of the world's greatest novels. Nikolay Strakhov was also one of the most prominent opponents of Liberalism, Rationalism and Utilitarianism in Russia, who contributed greatly to the development of traditionalist Slavophile ideology and its more conservative and nationalist variant known as Pochvennichestvo. In 1883 Nikolay Strakhov wrote The Struggle Against the West in Russian Literature and supported ideas of Nikolay Danilevsky and claimed that Western European rationalism lacks scientific grounds.

Nikolay Strakhov supported and encouraged the young Vasily Rozanov to become a writer and philosopher. Despite his conservatism and support for official government ideology of Orthodoxy, Autocracy, and Nationality he was at times criticized by pro-government publications such as Mikhail Katkov's Moskovskie Vedomosti. Russian liberals bitterly resented Strakhov and considered him a reactionary philosopher.

Strakhov died in Saint Petersburg in 1896; he never married and had no children.
