= Lyubov Dostoevskaya =

Russian writer and memoirist (1869–1926)

- Любовь Достоевская
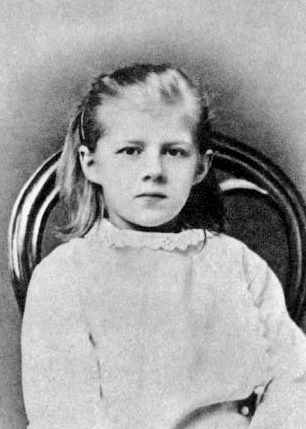
- Lyubov Dostoevskaya as a child in the 1870s
- Born: Lyubov Fyodorovna Dostoevskaya; 14 September 1869; Dresden, Germany
- Died: 10 November 1926 (aged 57); Gries, Bolzano, Italy
- Occupation: Writer
- Parents: Fyodor Dostoevsky; Anna Dostoevskaya
- Writing career
- Notable work: Dostoyevsky According to His Daughter (1920)

Lyubov Fyodorovna Dostoevskaya (Russian: Любо́вь Фёдоровна Достое́вская; 14 September 1869 – 10 November 1926), also known by the name Aimée Dostoyevskaya, was a Russian writer and memoirist.

== Personal life ==
She was the second daughter of famous writer Fyodor Dostoevsky and his wife Anna. Their first, Sofya, was born in 1868 and died the same year.

Lyubov never married. Later in her life she became estranged from her mother and moved out of their house. In 1913, after a trip abroad for medical treatment, Lyubov decided to stay there, and she lived abroad until her death in 1926. At that period she was also known by the name Aimée Dostoyevskaya (Russian: Эме Достоевская).

She died in Italy of pernicious anemia.

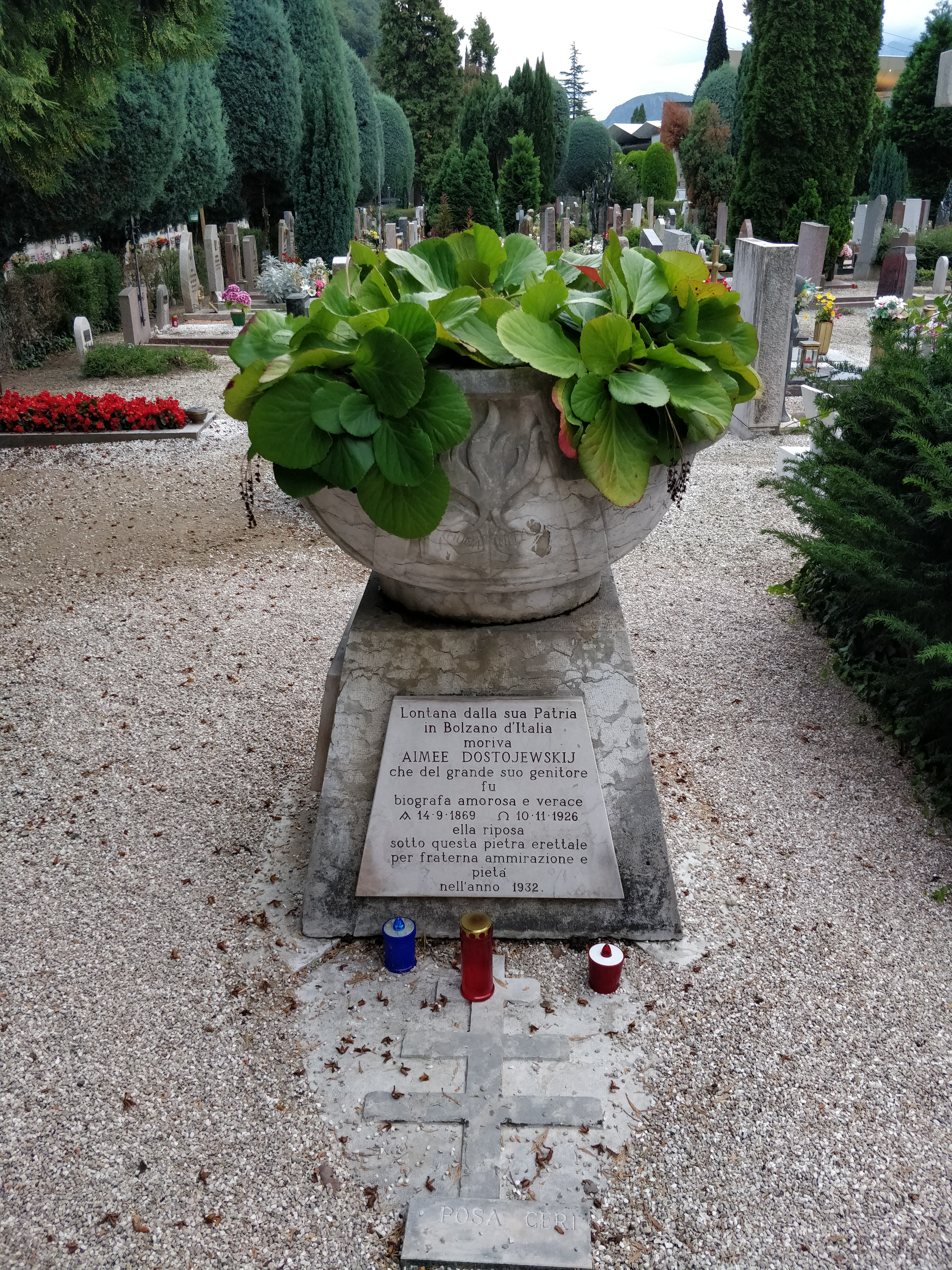
The tomb in the Bolzano cemetery

Although Lyubov Dostoevskaya was Orthodox, the funeral rite was Catholic by mistake. A simple wooden cross on her grave was soon replaced by a small porphyry tomb. In 1931 Italia Letteraria magazine suggested that since Dostoevskaya was buried in Italy, it was the Italian government that should establish a memorial. In December 1931 a granite pedestal was constructed, with an epitaph written by the editor of Venezia Tridentina magazine. Her resting place in Gries has been preserved after cemetery reconstruction. Her tomb was moved to Bolzano city's cemetery in 1957.

== Works ==
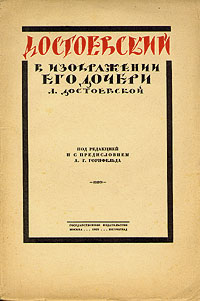
Dostoyevsky as Portrayed by His Daughter, published in Russian by Gosudarstvennoe Izdatelstvo.

Lyubov Dostoevskaya is best known for the book Dostoyevsky as Portrayed by His Daughter (German: Dostoejewski geschildert von seiner Tochter, also known as Dostoyevsky According to His Daughter), originally published in Munich in 1920. Her memoirs, written in French and published in German, were later translated into other European languages. In 1920 the book was released in Dutch (in Arnhem), the following year there were translations into Swedish and English, and in 1922 it was published in the United States and Italy. A Russian version, highly abridged, was published in 1922 by Gosudarstvennoe Izdatelstvo (Saint Petersburg) under the title "Достоевский в изображении его дочери Л. Достоевской".

The work contains many factual inaccuracies, partly because Lyubov was only 11 at the time of her father's death, and partly because she based the memoirs on her mother's stories. Many researchers tend to see this memoir as subjective and unreliable, citing as an example her bias in the description of the relationship between Dostoevsky and his first wife, Mariya Isayeva. Both Lyubov and her mother Anna expressed hatred towards Isayeva.

Her other works include the short story collection Bolnye devushki (Russian: Больные девушки; 1911), and the novels Emigrantka (Эмигрантка; 1912) and Advokatka (Адвокатка; 1913).

== English translations ==
- The Emigrant, (Novel), Constable and Co, London, 1916. from Archive.org
- Fyodor Dostoyevsky: A Study, Yale University Press, 1922. from Archive.org
