= Anna Dostoevskaya =

Russian memoirist (1846–1918)

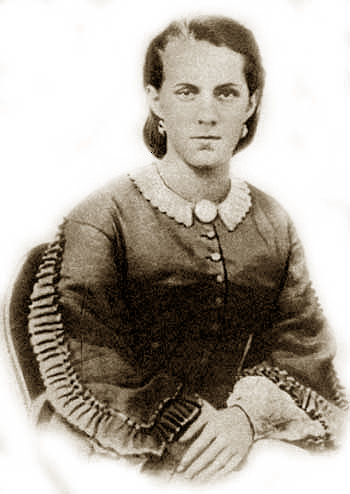
- Born: Anna Grigoryevna Snitkina (Анна Григорьевна Сниткина); 30 August 1846; Saint Petersburg, Russian Empire
- Died: 9 June 1918 (aged 71); Yalta, Taurida Governorate
- Resting place: Tikhvin Cemetery
- Occupations: Memoirist; stenographer
- Spouse: Fyodor Dostoevsky (m. 1867; died 1881)
- Children: 4, including Lyubov Dostoevskaya

Anna Grigoryevna Dostoevskaya (née Snitkina; Russian: Анна Григорьевна Достоевская; 30 August 1846 – 9 June 1918) was a Russian memoirist, stenographer, and assistant, as well as the second wife (from 1867) of writer Fyodor Dostoevsky. She was also one of the first female philatelists in Russia. Dostoevskaya wrote two biographical books about her husband, Fyodor Dostoevsky, both of which were published posthumously: Anna Dostoyevskaya's Diary in 1867, which was issued in 1923, and Memoirs of Anna Dostoyevskaya (also known as Reminiscence of Anna Dostoyevskaya), in 1925.

== Early life ==
Anna Grigoryevna Snitkina was born to Maria Anna and Grigory Ivanovich Snitko, who upon moving from Poltava Governorate to Saint-Petersburg changed his surname from Snitko to Snitkin.

She graduated from an academic high school summa cum laude and subsequently trained as a stenographer.

== Marriage ==
On 4 October 1866, Anna Snitkina started working as a stenographer on Fyodor Dostoevsky's novel The Gambler. A month later they became engaged.

In the Memoirs, Anna describes how Dostoevsky began his marriage proposal by outlining the plot of an imaginary new novel, as if he needed her advice on female psychology. In the story an old painter makes a proposal to a young girl whose name is Anya. Dostoevsky asked if it was possible for a girl so young and different in personality to fall in love with the painter. Anna answered that it was quite possible. Then he told Anna: "Put yourself in her place for a moment. Imagine I am the painter, I confessed to you and asked you to be my wife. What would you answer?" Anna said: "I would answer that I love you and I will love you forever".

On 15 February 1867, the couple were married. Two months later they went abroad, where they remained for over four years (until July 1871). Shortly before their departure two of Dostoevsky's creditors filed charges against him.

During a stop in Baden, Dostoevsky lost all of his money playing roulette, as well as his wife's clothes and belongings. Anna seems to have succeeded, like Dostoevsky himself, in divorcing his gambling mania from his moral personality, and in regarding it as something extraneous to his true character. At that time Anna started writing the diary. For almost a year they lived in Geneva. Dostoevsky worked very hard to regain his fortune. On 5 March [O.S. 22 February] 1868 their first daughter Sofia was born, but she died on 24 May at the age of three months. In 1869, in Dresden, their second daughter was born, named Lyubov Dostoyevskaya (died in 1926). Back in St. Petersburg Anna gave birth to two sons Fyodor (16 July 1871 – 4 January 1922) and Alexey (10 August 1875 – 16 May 1878). Anna took over all financial issues, including publishing business matters and negotiations, and soon liberated her husband from debt. In 1871, Dostoevsky gave up gambling.

== Later life ==
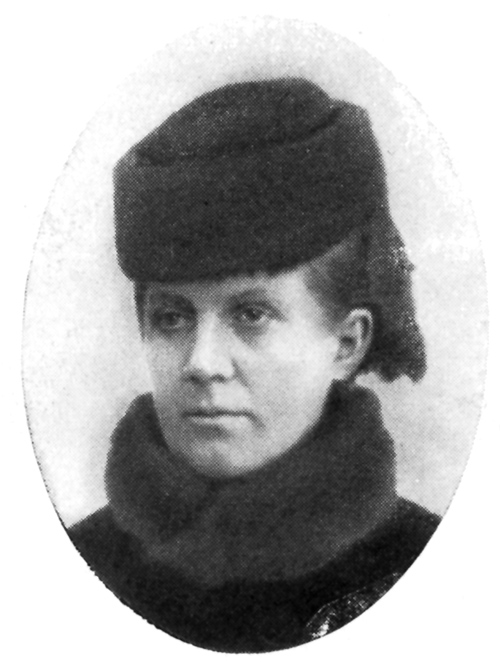
Dostoevskaya in the 1880s

In the year of Dostoevsky's death (1881) Anna turned 35 years old. She never remarried. After the death of her husband she collected his manuscripts, letters, documents and photographs. In 1906 she created a room dedicated to Fyodor Dostoevsky in the State Historical Museum.

== Career ==
Anna Dostoevskaya née Snitkina trained to be a stenographer and planned to earn her own living. She was recommended by her professor to Fyodor Dostoevsky to help him complete his novel The Gambler. Dostoevsky had agreed to a contract with publisher F. T. Stellovsky which would have forfeited his copyright for this novel and future novels for nearly 10 years if he did not meet a deadline. Anna's family were great admirers of Dostoevsky, particularly her father, who had read all of his books. They did not have much time, but Anna was determined. Initially Dostoevsky dictated too fast but once they established a pace they completed the project just in time. They also fell in love.

Anna did not have the career she planned but she was essential to Dostoevsky's work. She took over sales of his novels, particularly Demons, from their apartment in St Petersburg, and began managing his business affairs.

== Philately ==
Her stamp collection was established in 1867 in Dresden. It started, as explained in the Memoirs of Anna Dostoyevskaya, with a dispute between Anna and Fyodor Dostoyevsky, who made some critical comments about female inconstancy. Anna was annoyed that her husband did not consider women of her generation capable of persistence or devotion to anything. She told her husband that she would prove him wrong and show him that a woman may pursue one goal for years. She decided to collect stamps and filled up her collection throughout her life. According to the Memoirs, she did not buy a single stamp. All of them were either her own discoveries or donations from friends. The fate of this collection is unknown.

== See also ==
- Twenty Six Days from the Life of Dostoyevsky
- Oru Sankeerthanam Pole
