= Graber =

Graber or Gräber is a German surname originating from Switzerland, people or entities may include:

== People ==
- Anthony Graber, American cleared of charges of violation of Maryland wiretapping law
- Bill Graber, American pole vaulter
- Bill Graber, founder of the Lez Get Real website
- Christoph Beat Graber, Swiss academic
- Doug Graber, former American football coach
- Erich Graber, Italian luger
- Fred A. Graber (1895–1950), New York politician
- George Alexander Graber, who wrote under the name Alexander Cordell
- Giovanni Graber, Italian luger
- Hermann Veit Graber (1873–1939), Austrian geologist
- Jay Graber, founder and CEO of Bluesky, a microblogging social platform.
- Juston R. Graber, specialist involved in Operation Iron Triangle
- Manfred Gräber, Italian luger
- Martin Graber, American politician in Iowa
- Phyllis Graber, American tennis player
- Pierre Graber, Swiss politician and member of the Swiss Federal Council
- Richard Graber, American lawyer
- Rod Graber, former Major League Baseball center fielder
- S. Graber, Italian luger
- Sheila Graber, British animator
- Susan P. Graber, American attorney and jurist
- Ted Graber, American interior designer
- Travis Graber, American football coach
- Vincent J. Graber, Sr. (1931–2014), member of the New York State Assembly
- Vitus Graber or Veit Graber (1844–1892), Austrian zoologist

== Other uses ==
- Carrosserie Hermann Graber is a coachbuilder based in Wichtrach in central Switzerland.
- Graber Olive House
- House at 1648 Riverside Drive, also known as the Graber Residence
