= Friedrich Erismann =

Swiss ophthalmologist and hygienist

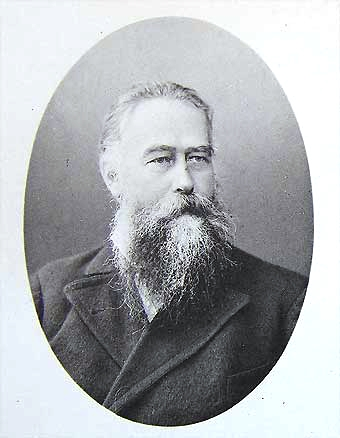
- Born: 14 November 1842; Gontenschwil, Switzerland
- Died: 13 November 1915 (aged 72)
- Education: University of Zurich
- Relatives: Nadezhda Suslova (spouse, 1867–1883, divorced)
- Medical career
- Profession: ophthalmologist, hygienist

Friedrich Huldreich Erismann, or Fyodor Fyodorovich Erismann (14 November 1842 – 13 November 1915) was a Swiss ophthalmologist and hygienist.

== Biography ==
Erismann was born in Gontenschwil, Switzerland. In 1867, Erismann earned his medical doctorate at the University of Zurich, subsequently furthering his studies in ophthalmology in Heidelberg, Vienna and Berlin. In 1867 he married Nadezhda Suslova, and two years later relocated to Saint Petersburg as an ophthalmologist. His interests soon turned to issues such as public health and conditions of the poor. In the early 1870s he studied hygiene and physiology in Munich, where his instructors were Max von Pettenkofer (1818–1901) and Carl von Voit (1831–1908).

Following participation in Russo-Turkish War, he moved to Moscow, where from 1881 he served as a lecturer at the University of Moscow. In 1884 he was appointed professor of hygiene and director at the institute of hygiene. At the University of Moscow, one of his students was playwright Anton Chekhov. In 1870 he invented the new construction of school desk which was used in Russian schools till the beginning of 1960s.

Erismann was a pioneer of scientific hygiene in Russia, and sought to improve water quality and food standards in St. Petersburg and Moscow. In 1896 Erismann was dismissed from his position at Moscow for political reasons, as he expressed support of student revolutionaries and denounced the living conditions of the Russian people. Afterwards, he returned to Switzerland and became involved with political and health issues in Zürich.

He published in German and Russian. Among his numerous writings was Gesundheitslehre für Gebildete aller Stände (Health education for the educated of all classes), a book that was published in several editions.
