= Anna Fischer-Dückelmann =

German physician (1856–1917)

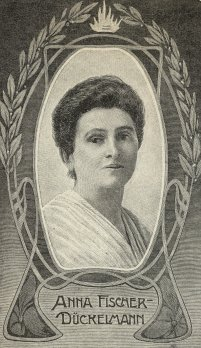
- Born: 5 July 1856; Wadowice, Tragwein
- Died: 1917 (aged 60–61); Ascona
- Occupation: Naturopath

Anna Fischer-Dückelmann (5 July 1856 – 1917) was a German physician and naturopath. She was among the first women to receive a medical degree in German-speaking Europe. She earned her degree at the University of Zurich in 1896, a time before women were allowed to enrol in German universities or medical schools, and would publish many books, which have been translated into multiple languages.

== Life ==
Anna Dückelmann was the daughter of the Austro-Hungarian military doctor and landowner Friedrich Dückelmann. She spent her youth in Vienna and Tragwein. Because of her early interest in medicine, she was allowed to accompany her father on visits to garrison hospitals. In her memoirs she wrote: "I was already enthusiastic about hydrotherapy at the age of fifteen, I also curated pets, and when I was sixteen years old I published my first hygiene article against the corset. During this time, the thought of studying medicine clearly entered my mind for the first time."

In 1880, against her parents' wishes, she married the philosopher Arnold Fischer. They originally lived in Graz and then moved to Frankfurt. She decided to keep her maiden name, which was not common in the 1800s. Arnold Fischer worked for the Frankfurter Tagblatt, and the couple founded the weekly newspaper Volkswohl together, in which Fischer-Dückelmann wrote about medical topics and also criticized the lack of female doctors: "It remains embarrassing for many women that they should let men teach them about the most delicate things. How immature our sex is until it is able to protect itself from such male interventions in its innermost affairs by female physicians." In Frankfurt she met the first gynaecologist in Germany, Hope Bridges Adams Lehmann.

As a mother of three children, she moved to Zürich with her family at the age of 34. She studied medicine there from 1890 to 1896. She received her doctorate with her dissertation The cases of postpartum infections observed from April 1888 to January 1895 in the Zurich women's clinic. She was one of the first women to study medicine, which was not without controversy and led to discussions in the specialist press. Early on, Fischer-Dückelmann criticized the use of untested methods in gynecology, which caused many women to die of bleeding. She called for a better distinction between new and actually useful methods and began to deal with naturopathy.

In the Bilz sanatorium in Oberloessnitz (today Radebeul) she acquired the practice as an assistant doctor to practice the medical profession. From 1897 to 1914, she ran a medical practice for gynaecology and paediatrics in the Villa Artushof in Oberloschwitz near Dresden. When World War I broke out, she moved to Monte Verità near Ascona in the canton of Ticino. In 1913, she acquired an estate near the local naturopathic institution based on a voluntary association. Critics denounced her medical self-help and naturopathy as quackery.

== Vegetarianism ==
Fischer-Dückelmann was a vegetarian and did not drink alcohol. Her 1901 domestic health manual The Woman as a Family Doctor advocated a vegetarian diet. The book went through multiple editions and was translated into thirteen languages. In the book she recommended that people should be eating "more sweet fruits and green vegetables instead of meat and alcohol".

She argued that her migraine attacks from her youth had been caused by meat consumption and that these attacks stopped when she gave up eating meat. However, she still considered herself a neurasthenic as she could not cope with mental stress.

== Works ==
Die Frau als Hausärztin (The Woman as a Family Doctor, 1901) was one of her best-known works. The original text was adapted for male readers; this version remained in print for 60 years. A version of the book was published up to 1993. Some of her writings were completed by her daughter Elsa.

== Legacy ==
The Anna Fischer-Dückelmann Visiting Professorship is awarded each year at the University of Zurich.
