= Danuser =

Danuser is a surname. Notable people with the surname include:

- Brigitta Danuser, Swiss academic
- Christian Danuser (born 1953), Swiss biathlete
- Hans Danuser (born 1953), Swiss artist and photographer
- Hermann Danuser (born 1946), Swiss-German musicologist
