= Henry Harfield =

American lawyer

Henry Harfield (October 17, 1913 – September 13, 2003) was an American lawyer with the New York law firm of Shearman & Sterling, representing Citibank. He developed the legal framework for certificates of deposit introduced as a banking product by his client, Citibank, in 1961.

He graduated from Yale in 1934 and Columbia Law in 1937.

He was involved in returning prisoners from the Bay of Pigs invasion, for which he received a letter of thanks from the White House in regards to his negotiation of a letter of credit. He also wrote articles and a practice handbook on the subject

He argued before the Supreme Court of the United States on two cases, First National City Bank v. Banco Nacional de Cuba (1971) and First National City Bank v. Banco Para el Comercio Exterior de Cuba (1982).

In 1988, he published "Extraterritorial Imperatives" in the Case Western Reserve Journal of International Law.
