= Maria Alexandrovna Sechenova =

First female Russian ophthalmologist

Maria Alexsandrovna Sechenova (Russian: Mария Aлександровна Cеченова; 1839–1929) was the first female ophthalmologist surgeon from the Russian Empire. She was one of the first women to receive an education from a foreign university and one of the first female doctors in Russia.

== Early life ==
Maria Alexsandrovna Sechenova was the daughter of Alexander Afnasevich Obruchev, a landowner of Tver Oblast and a famous army general in Russia. She was a sister of Vladimir Alexandrovich Obruchev. To become independent and to attend university, she organized a dummy marriage in August 1861 to her parents' home teacher, medical student, P. I. Bokov, who later became a popular doctor in Moscow. In the mid-1860s, she fell in love and entered a real marriage with I. M. Sechenov.

She was one of the first women to attend lecture in university in 1859. Prior, no woman tried to enter university. After her arranged marriage with Bokov, Sechenova and Nadezhda Suslova, the first Russian female to receive a doctoral degree, began studying at St. Petersburg.

At the Medical and Surgical Academy, she studied anatomy under V. L. Gruber and physiology under I. M. Sechenov. Sechenova was one of the first students to work with I. M. Sechenov in his laboratory at the Medical and Surgical Academy. Over the summer of 1862, she took Sechenov's supplementary physiology course. After universities began preventing women from attending lectures, Sechenova was forced to leave the academy. In 1868, she moved to Switzerland to study at the University of Zurich and graduated in 1871 with doctoral dissertation "On the doctrine of keratitis."

== Career ==
During the Franco-Prussian war (1870–1871), she worked voluntarily as a nurse of mercy in the French hospital of Verdun. After she returned to Russia, Sechenova began working in an eye disease clinic in Kiev. When women were banned from the university, before continuing her study, Sechenova conducted experiments and published them in the Medical Bulletin. Before leaving Europe and returning to Russia, she published the study, “A way to produce artificial color blindness”, under Sechenov's guidance. Upon her return to Russia, she practiced medicine at home. Later, due to the lack of opportunities to work as an eye surgeon, Sechenova became more engaged with literary and natural sciences. She is the translator of Bram's Animal Life.

== Popular culture ==
N. G. Chernyshevsky wrote What is to be done?, a famous novel that features Vera Pavlovna, a character based on Sechenova. At the beginning of his novel, Chernyshevsky notes, “... all the essential in my story are facts experiences by my good friends.” (Kirsanov - Sechenov, Vera Pavlovna - Maria Alexandrovna, Lopukhov - Bokov).
