= Christian Beyel =

Swiss mathematician

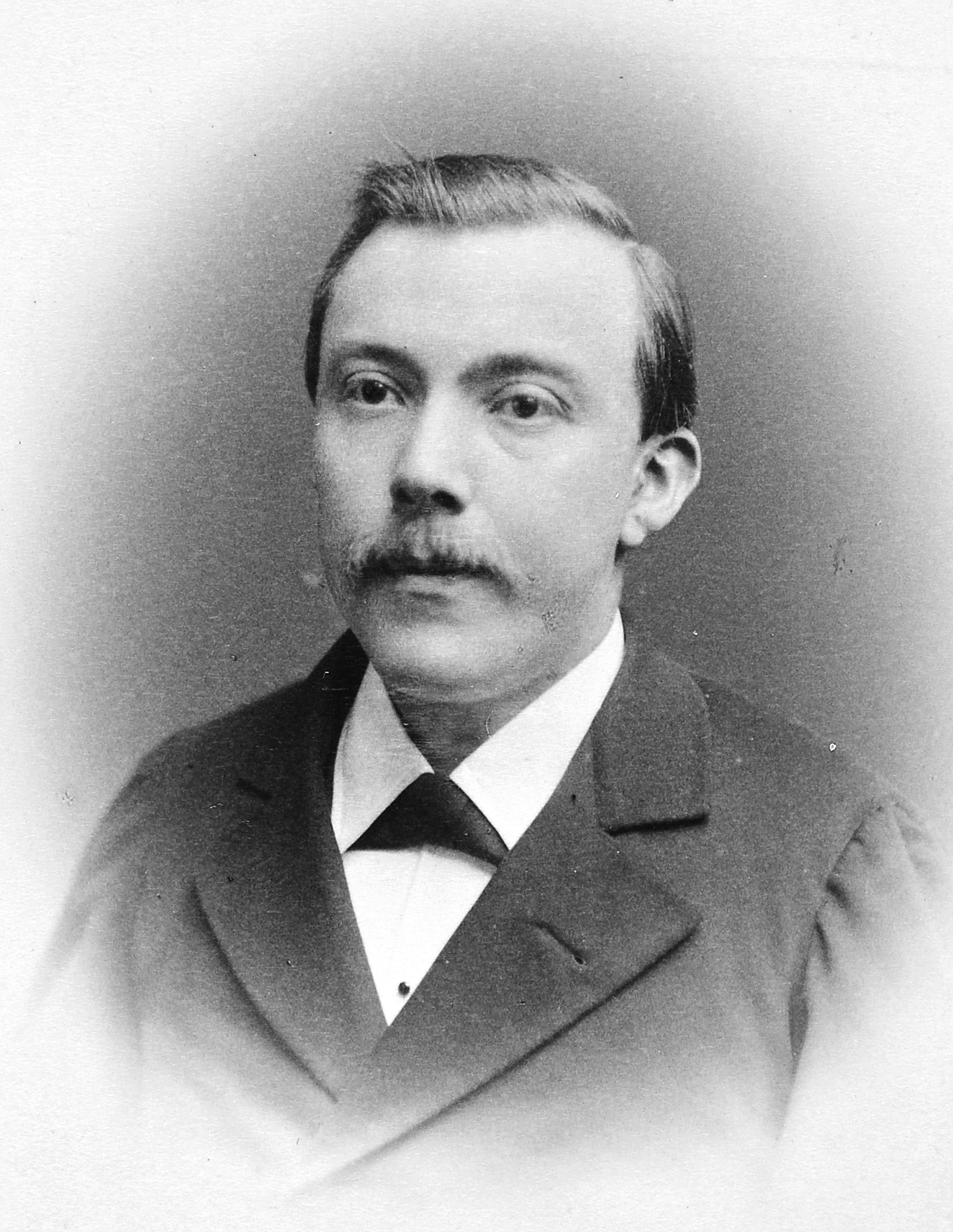
- Christian Beyel, c. 1886
- Born: 29 November 1854; Zürich, Switzerland
- Died: 16 January 1941 (aged 86)
- Education: University of Zurich
- Scientific career
- Fields: Mathematics
- Workplaces: ETH Zurich
- Thesis: Centrische Kollineation nter Ordnung in der Ebene vermittelt durch Aehnlichkeitspunkte von Kreisen (1882)

Christian Beyel (29 November 1854 – 16 January 1941) was a Swiss mathematician, professor in the Polytechnic of Zurich.

== Life and work ==
Beyel, son of a bookseller, studied at Polytechnic of Zurich from 1872 to 1876. The following year he worked as engineer in the Swiss Northeastern Railway Company, Schweizerische Nordostbahn only for one year but he moved to Göttingen University in 1877 in order to study mathematics. Returned to Polytechnicum in Zurich, he was assistant of the professors Wilhelm Fiedler and Wilhelm Ritter. In 1882 he was awarded a doctorate from University of Zurich and the following year the venia legendi from the Polytechnicum. He taught at Polytechnicum until his retirement in 1934.

He was a prolific writer. His most known book, Der mathematische Gedanke in der Welt (The mathematical thinking in the world), reprinted still today, is described as a declaration of love to mathematics. He also wrote several books and articles, mostly about geometry.

In addition to his mathematical work, he also published some articles about politics, literature and cinema. He was one of the founding members of the Swiss Association for Educational Cinematography (SAFU) in 1929. He was supporter of the germanophilist association Stimmen im Sturm (Voices in the Storm).

== Bibliography ==
- Billeter, Nicole (2016). "Voices in the Storm (journal)". 1914-1918-online. doi:10.15463/ie1418.10907.
- Eminger, Stefanie Ursula (2015). Carl Friedrich Geiser and Ferdinand Rudio: The Men Behind the First International Congress of Mathematicians (PDF). St. Andrews University. pp. Doctoral dissertation.
- Gertiser, Anita (2006). "Domestizierung des bewegten Bildes. Vom dokumentarischen Film zum Lehrmedium". Montage/Av (in German). 15/1: 58–73. ISSN 0942-4954.
