= Thomas G. Shearman =

Lawyer and political economist (1834–1900)

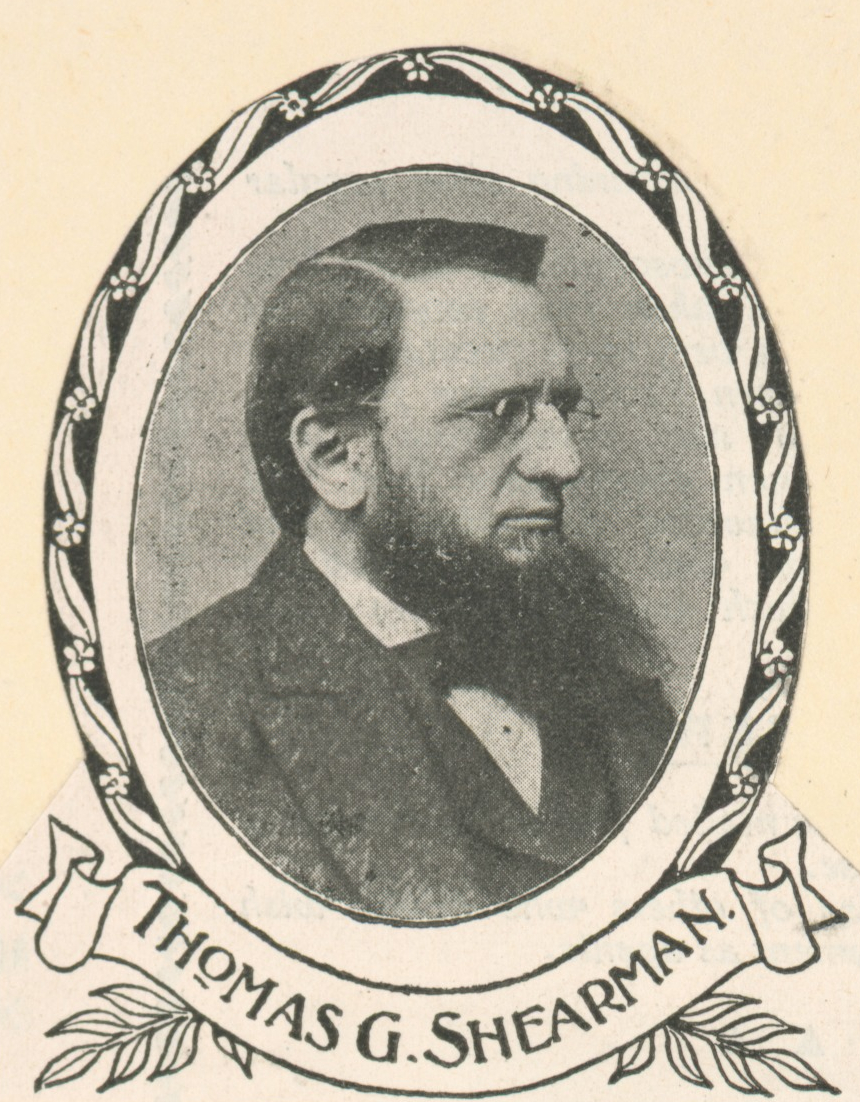
- Shearman c. 1899
- Born: 1834; Birmingham, England, U.K.
- Died: September 29, 1900 (aged 65–66); Brooklyn, New York, U.S.
- Occupation: Lawyer

Thomas Gaskell Shearman was a lawyer and political economist. He left school at age 13 and never attended a college or law school. However, he authored two important legal treatises early in his career. As a lawyer, he handled cases that are still written about today. In 1873 he co-founded a New York law firm, Shearman & Sterling. (Note: Shearman & Sterling merged with the London based law firm Allen & Overy in 2024.) In his time, he was a leading voice on many public issues. He is particularly remembered for speaking out against tariffs and excise taxation in the United States as an unjust burden on the poor. He was in favor of a tax on the unimproved value of all land.

== Early life ==
Thomas Gaskell Shearman was born in Birmingham, England in 1834, the youngest of five children of John and Sarah Price Shearman. He came to the United States with his family in 1844 and settled in New York. Because the family had very limited resources, Shearman left formal schooling at age 13.

He worked as a clerk in various businesses until 1857. He then began reading in the library of young lawyer friends and at the library of the New York Law Institute. To support himself, he found work digesting court decisions and other legal materials for lawyers involved in special projects and in writing treatises. He was admitted to the bar in 1859 based on "reading the law", rather than attending law school.

He married Ellen Partridge in January 1859.

An abolitionist, he tried to enlist in the Union Army at the outbreak of the Civil War but was rejected because of poor eyesight.

== Legal career ==
Among Shearman's first clients was David Dudley Field, a prominent lawyer in his time and a leader in movements to reform the law. Courtroom practice was then largely based on the complex English pleading system that required all claims to fit within established categories. Shearman was initially hired to work on one of Field's many law reform projects. Field subsequently hired Shearman as his firm's managing clerk in 1864. In 1868, Shearman became the third partner in the newly renamed firm of Field & Shearman. The firm, whose only other partner was Field's son Dudley, had a thriving practice. For example, in 1866 Field argued and won two politically sensitive cases in the U.S. Supreme Court, Ex parte Milligan and the Test Oath cases. The firm represented Field's brother Cyrus in his transatlantic cable venture that finally met with success in 1866 after more than a decade of effort.

An anonymous article, critical of certain New York judges affiliated with Tammany Hall, appeared in a prominent national magazine in 1867. It did not name the judges criticized, but they were easily identifiable from the information included. The article has been widely attributed to Shearman. It was apparently written shortly before the Field firm began to represent Jim Fisk and Jay Gould in 1868. Gould is still remembered as among the most widely reviled of the "robber barons" of the time. As managers of the Erie Railroad, Fisk and Gould sought advice in connection with their defense against a threatened Vanderbilt takeover of the Erie. Part of the Fisk-Gould defense included putting Tammany's William Marcy "Boss" Tweed on the Erie Board. After multiple legendary confrontations in and out of court, a settlement was reached that left Fisk and Gould in control. In this matter, Shearman was required to seek orders from some of the judges he had criticized in the article. In 1868, Fisk and Gould became active traders in Erie stock and again found Vanderbilt as their primary adversary. Once again, Fisk and Gould prevailed with the advice of Field & Shearman. A year later, Fisk and Gould tried to take over the Albany & Susquehanna Railroad and merge it with the Erie. That attempt failed. (Note: The "Erie" was the Scarlet Woman.) Together, these three efforts are often referred to as the "Erie Wars".

In the summer of 1869, Fisk and Gould became involved in an effort to corner the gold market. That effort, still referred to as "Black Friday", bankrupted many. Hundreds of lawsuits were filed against them. Field & Shearman acted for Fisk & Gould on these claims.

Later in 1869, Field & Shearman defended "Boss" Tweed, who had been indicted for misappropriating New York City funds. Tweed's trial ended in a hung jury. Soon thereafter, Gould became involved in the ownership and operation of the Union Pacific and other railroad properties, with the help of Field & Shearman. Despite this intense activity, the firm remained small, as was the custom in those days.

In 1873, after the Tweed trial, David Dudley Field withdrew from the practice of law and relocated to Europe for a year to try to bring his procedural reforms to the law there. The Field & Shearman partnership was dissolved. Shearman chose John W. Sterling as his new partner, and the firm of Shearman & Sterling was formed. Sterling was the fourth and newest partner in Field & Shearman. Many Field & Shearman clients, including Gould, opted to use Shearman & Sterling rather than Field's son, who continued in practice separately. Shearman & Sterling's initial engagements included many Gould cases remaining from Black Friday.

Field and Shearman each drew harsh public, bar and judicial criticism arising from their defense of their clients in the Erie Wars. (Note: Also see for example Frederick C. Hicks' High Finance in the Sixties (Yale U. Press 1929), a collection of previously published essays regarding the Erie Wars, some supporting Field but others criticizing his conduct and that of Shearman.) Field maintained that unpopular, even bad, clients were entitled to legal representation. Formal ethics rules for lawyers were not yet articulated. (Note: The courts have long asserted power to discipline lawyers. However, the first national ethical code for lawyers was the 1908 American Bar Association Canons of Ethics.) Nevertheless, a committee of the newly formed Association of the Bar of the City of New York met to consider a censure of Field. One New York judge threatened Field with contempt in the defense of Tweed, and another accused both Field and Shearman of "a preconcieved scheme ...[executed] by the use and abuse of legal oprocess and proceedings" in connection with the last of the Erie Wars. These threats continued for two years with Field vigorously disputing them. No censure was ever voted nor was contempt imposed on either Field or Shearman.

=== Faith and defence of Minister Beecher ===
Just months before the formation of Shearman & Sterling, Shearman began to take a leading role in defending his friend and minister, Henry Ward Beecher, both in and out of court. Beecher was then probably the most famous preacher in the United States, and lectured all over the world. Over several years Shearman counseled and defended Beecher against accusations of adultery with the wife of a friend, both of whom were parishioners. This was a civil matter, with the husband seeking damages. The husband was expelled from Beecher's Plymouth Church congregation. Thereafter, a trial involving 110 court days was held. It received unprecedented newspaper coverage. The case ended with the jury unable to reach a verdict, but said to have voted 9-3 in favor of Beecher.

Throughout his life, Shearman was deeply committed to his religion. Beginning in 1857, when the family moved to Brooklyn, he attended Plymouth Church. Over the years, he served as clerk, trustee and deacon of the church. For many years he was superintendent of its Sunday school.

== Political economics philosophy ==
Shearman took public positions on the great issues of the day, even as he practiced law. He was an abolitionist, a free-trader, and a friend to oppressed groups everywhere. He lectured and wrote articles on the many issues that attracted his interest.

At the center of his attention regarding public issues was taxation and the increasing concentration of wealth in the United States. (Note: For example, Shearman testified as an expert witness before a subcommittee of the House Ways and Means Committee on October 16, 1893 regarding a proposed revival of the income tax (Shearman Testimony"). His testimony is reprinted by Gale MOML Print Editions (undated).) The first permanent income tax was enacted in 1913. (Note: There was an income tax for 10 years during and after the Civil War. It ended in 1872.) Before that, the U.S. government was financed based on tariffs and excise taxes. He considered these taxes unjust because they burdened the poor and favored the rich.

The post-Civil War period brought remarkable economic growth for the country. However, those who worked on farms and in factories did not share in the economic benefits. For them, the Gilded Age was marked by depressions, unemployment and bloody strikes. The 1873 depression lasted until at least 1877. The 1880s brought mass demonstrations, and, in 1886, the first anarchist bombing. Strikes spread across the country in 1894. The depression of 1893 lasted until 1897.

Henry George became a major figure in the 1880s with the publication of his book, Progress and Poverty. He advocated a new tax on the value of all land (but not the improvements on it) to replace tariffs and excise taxes. The new tax came to be referred to as the "single tax" at Shearman's suggestion. George believed that this new revenue stream would change the economy and lift workers out of poverty. The book had a remarkable impact at the time and sold over 2 million copies. It is probably the all time bestseller for a book on economics. George came to New York in 1880 to publicize his book. Shearman became a fervent supporter of the George tax proposal, and became a leader in efforts to publicize and enact it.

Shearman gradually began withdrawing from the practice of law in the mid-1890s as he become more deeply involved in political economics. In 1889, Forum, a magazine of national circulation, published Shearman's article, "The Owners of the United States". In it, based on the rudimentary statistics available at the time, he concluded that much of the collective wealth of the country was in the hands of a small number of families. A historian of U.S. taxation referred to the article as "one of the most respected surveys" of the deep divide that had formed between rich and poor as the U.S. became industrialized.

Shearman published many articles on public issues. His only book, other than legal treatises, was Natural Taxation, published by G.P. Putnam's Son in 1895. It went through several editions. In it he supported George's ideas, although he viewed the single tax mainly as a fiscal matter rather than on a philosophical basis. The book provided a factual basis to supplement George's theoretical arguments. (Note: To demonstrate the practicality of George's moral approach, The Shortest Road to the Single Tax (Joseph Fels Fund undated) was published. It includes portions of Natural Taxation and an article by George published in 1891.) Shearman was a major force in organizing the New York Tax Reform Association in 1891. The now universal practice of assessing the value of land and improvements separately arose from the efforts of the association. Shearman took a leading role in failed efforts in 1895 to enact the single tax into law in Delaware. To this day, the single tax has its adherents, although some concede that the costs of government can no longer be supported solely by such a tax. (Note: See for example, Wenzer, An Anthology of Henry George's Thought (U. of Rochester Press 1997). A Henry George School continues to function in New York at this writing. See also, Annika Neklason, "The 140 Year Old Dream of Government Without Taxation", Atlantic Magazine, April 15, 2019.)

== Later life and death ==
Shearman died on September 29, 1900. He was survived by his wife of 41 years, Ellen. They were childless. A eulogy by Beecher's successor at Plymouth Church, Dr. Lyman Abbott, saw Shearman as "by profession a lawyer, by temperment and nature... a reformer".

== Bibliography ==
- Applegate, Debby (2006). The most famous man in America: the biography of Henry Ward Beecher. New York: Doubleday. ISBN 978-0385513968.
- Bergan, Philip J.; Fiss, Owen M.; McCurdy, Charles W. (1986). The Fields and the law. San Francisco: United States District Court for the Northern District of California Historical Society. ISBN 978-0-9616254-0-5.
- Earle, Walter K. (1973). Shearman and Sterling, 1873-1973 (2d ed.). New York. OL 5084339M.
- Heilbroner, Robert L. (1953). The Worldly Philosophers. Simon & Schuster.
- Martin, George (1970). Causes and Conflicts: The Centennial History of the Association of the Bar of the City of New York, 1870-1970. Houghton Mifflin.
- Weisman, Steven R. (November 3, 2004). The Great Tax Wars: Lincoln-Teddy Roosevelt-Wilson How the Income Tax Transformed America. Simon & Schuster. ISBN 9780743243810.
- Young, Arthur Nichols (1916). The Single Tax Movement in the United States. Princeton University Press.
