= Diego A. Pizzagalli =

Swiss neuroscientist, Professor of Psychiatry at Harvard Medical School

- Awards: Christensen Fellowships, St Catherine's College, Oxford University (2024) Visiting Professor, Oxford University (2023) Board Member, Anxiety and Depression Association of America (2024) Neuropsychopharmacology Editor's Award for a Review (NEAR), American College of Neuropsychopharmacology (ACNP) (2023) MERIT awards, the National Institute of Mental Health (2016, 2022) Editor-In-Chief, Cognitive, Affective and Behavioral Neuroscience (since 2021) Anna-Monika-Prize for Research in the Neurobiology and Treatment of Depressive Disorders (2019) NARSAD Distinguished Investigator Award, Brain & Behavior Research Foundation (2018) Joel Elkes Research Award, American College of Neuropsychopharmacology (ACNP) (2017) Stuart T. Hauser, M.D. PhD. Mentorship Award in Psychiatry, Harvard Medical School (2017) Anne M. Cataldo Excellence in Mentoring Award, McLean Hospital (2015)
- Scientific career
- Fields: Clinical and Affective Neuroscience
- Workplaces: Harvard University McLean Hospital

Diego A. Pizzagalli is a Swiss neuroscientist, the Founding Director of the Noel Drury, M.D. Institute for Translational Depression Discoveries, a Distinguished Professor in the Department of Psychiatry and Human Behavior & Department of Neurobiology and Behavior and the Noel Drury MD Endowed Chair at the University of California, Irvine. He is also a Visiting Professor at the University of Oxford.

Pizzagalli is known for his contributions to the neurobiology of anhedonia and depression. His research has focused on investigating the causes, consequences, and pathophysiology of depression, with particular emphasis on identifying neurobiological mechanisms and biomarkers associated with the disorder and treatment response..

== Education ==
Pizzagalli received his M.S. in Psychology in 1995 and Ph.D. in Psychology in 1998 from the University of Zurich, Switzerland. He then pursued a postdoctoral fellowship in affective neuroscience with Richard J. Davidson at the University of Wisconsin, Madison, where he used neuroimaging approaches (e.g., electroencephalogram, positron emission tomography) to identify neural markers associated with different symptom profiles and treatment response in major depression.

== Career ==
From 2002 to 2010, Pizzagalli was a faculty member in the Department of Psychology at Harvard University, where he served as the John and Ruth Hazel Associate Professor of the Social Sciences. In 2010, Pizzagalli joined McLean Hospital, Massachusetts to serve as the Founding Director of the Center for Depression, Anxiety and Stress Research (CDASR). At McLean Hospital, Pizzagalli was also the Director of the McLean Imaging Center (MIC), the Director of Research for the Division of Depression & Anxiety Disorders, the Director of the McLean Conte Center for the Neurobiology of Approach-Avoidance Decision Making, and the Director of the Laboratory for Affective and Translational Neuroscience.

In addition, he served as a Professor of Psychiatry at Harvard Medical School and held the position of Director of a Silvio O. Conte Center for Basic Translational Mental Health Research. Funded through a five-year grant from the National Institute of Mental Health (NIMH), this center is dedicated to studying the neurobiology of depression and anxiety disorders and identifying new treatment targets.

He served as Scientific Advisor on the US National Institute of Mental Health (NIMH) and the American Foundation for Suicide Prevention (AFSP). In 2021, he was named the Editor-in-Chief of Cognitive, Affective & Behavioral Neuroscience (CABN). He joined Anxiety and Depression Association of America (ADAA) in 2013 and joined the Board in 2024.

In January 2025, Pizzagalli joined the University of California, Irvine, serving as the Founding Director of the Noel Drury, M.D. Institute for Translational Depression Discoveries. Spanning the School of Medicine, School of Biological Sciences, and the School of Engineering, the Institute will lead the way in bench-to-bedside research, focusing on improved treatment and prevention strategies.

== Research ==
Pizzagalli's research is focused on three critical endophenotypes associated with depression: anhedonia, increased stress sensitivity, and executive function deficits. His studies use a wide range of methods, including behavioral, electrophysiological and neuroimaging approaches, as well as preclinical models. His latest research has uncovered clinical, behavioral, and neural markers that could assist in the selection of antidepressant treatments prior to the onset of the intervention, paving the way for prevention and personalized treatment.

Investigating Neurobiology of Anhedonia

Pizzagalli developed a laboratory-based measure of anhedonia – the Probabilistic Reward Task (PRT) – which has been used by hundreds of labs worldwide in both academia and the pharmaceutical industry. More recently, he has co-developed versions of the PRT that are functionally identical for use in humans, non-human primates, rats and mice. This development accelerates cross-species translation and evaluation of novel treatment targets.

Investigating Functional Neuroanatomy of Depression

Utilizing a combination of neuroimaging methods, Pizzagalli's research indicates that distinct brain activation patterns correlate with individual variances in treatment response and specific depression phenotypes. These findings hold significance in the identification of individuals at increased risk for depression and the advancement of more effective depression treatments.

Investigating Executive Dysfunction in Depression and At-Risk Individuals

Pizzagalli's research reveals the association between the behavioral impairments in depression and an exaggerated, automatic neural response to errors, along with limited recruitment of brain regions responsible for cognitive control. His ongoing studies aim to evaluate the hypothesis that these dysfunctions might increase vulnerability to subsequent depressive episodes.

Establishing Predictors of Treatment Response in Depression

Pizzagalli's research demonstrates that pretreatment resting EEG activity in the rostral anterior cingulate cortex predicted therapeutic improvement 4–6 months later in individuals with depression. Currently, his team is investigating innovative behavioral and EEG markers to assess treatment response, potentially improving treatment selection and reducing the personal and socioeconomic challenges associated with the current trial-and-error approach

== Awards and honors ==
- Christensen Fellowships, St Catherine's College, Oxford University, 2024
- Visiting Professor, Oxford University, 2023
- Gerald L. Klerman Senior Investigator Award, Depression and Bipolar Support Alliance (DBSA), 2023
- Board Member, Anxiety and Depression Association of America, 2024
- Neuropsychopharmacology Editor's Award for a Review (NEAR), American College of Neuropsychopharmacology (ACNP), 2023
- MERIT awards, the National Institute of Mental Health, 2016, 2022
- Editor-In-Chief, Cognitive, Affective and Behavioral Neuroscience, since 2021
- Anna-Monika-Prize for Research in the Neurobiology and Treatment of Depressive Disorders, 2019
- Highly Cited Researcher, Web of Science, since 2019
- NARSAD Distinguished Investigator Award, Brain & Behavior Research Foundation, 2017
- Scientific Advisor, American Foundation for Suicide Prevention, 2017
- Joel Elkes Research Award, American College of Neuropsychopharmacology (ACNP), 2017
- Stuart T. Hauser, M.D. PhD. Mentorship Award in Psychiatry, Harvard Medical School, 2017
- Anne M. Cataldo Excellence in Mentoring Award, McLean Hospital, 2015
- Early Career Award, the EEG and Clinical Neuroscience Society, 2007
- Distinguished Scientific Award for an Early Career Contribution to Psychophysiology, the Society for Psychophysiological Research, 2006

== Personal life ==
Pizzagalli was born and raised in Mendrisio, Switzerland. He is married to a clinical psychologist and has two adult children.
