= Markus U. Diethelm =

Swiss businessman and lawyer

Markus Diethelm
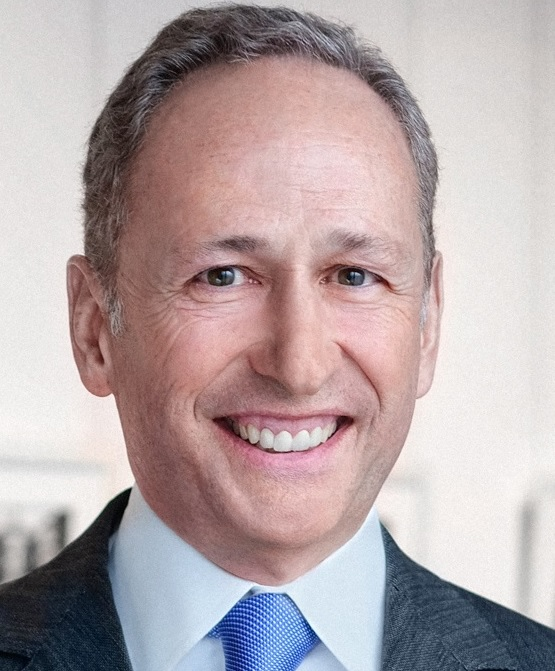
- Profile picture of Diethelm
- Born: 22 October 1957 (age 68)
- Education: University of Zurich; Stanford University

Markus U. Diethelm (born 22 October 1957) is currently the Group General Counsel of Credit Suisse AG and member of the Executive Board, holding this position since 2022. Prior to that, he held the same position at UBS AG since September 2008, when Diethelm was initially appointed as a member of the group executive board of UBS. Additionally, he served as an executive board member of UBS Business Solutions AG from 2015 to 2016.

== Education ==
Diethelm holds a law degree (lic.iur.) from the University of Zurich and a master's degree, and a PhD (JSD) from Stanford Law School.

== Career ==
Diethelm is a qualified attorney-at-law and is admitted to the bar in Zurich, Geneva and New York City.

In 1983, Diethelm started his career with the Zurich law firm Bär & Karrer.

He worked at Paul, Weiss, Rifkind, Wharton & Garrison in New York City in 1988 as a foreign associate. A year later, he practiced at New York's Shearman & Sterling, specializing in mergers and acquisitions. In 1992, he joined a Los Angeles law firm Gibson, Dunn & Crutcher, focusing on corporate matters, securities transactions, litigation and regulatory investigations while operating out of the firm's Brussels and Paris offices. He stayed with Gibson, Dunn & Crutcher until 1998.

=== Swiss Re ===
On 1 April 1998, Diethelm joined Swiss Re as group chief legal officer and was appointed to the executive board with effect from January 1, 2007.

Under his leadership, Swiss Re introduced a successful global model for the group's legal and compliance organization. Furthermore, Diethelm played a key role in the company's World Trade Center litigation and in major corporate development transactions.

=== UBS ===
Diethelm became a member of the group executive board and was appointed as group general counsel of UBS on 1 September 2008. Following the restructuring process, he was appointed to the same position within the UBS Group AG in 2014. He works closely with Colin Bell, the head of operational risk. In 2009, Diethelm negotiated with the U.S Department of Justice Tax Division Attorney Kevin M. Downing in an investigation about tax fraud. The UBS paid $780 million and revealed several client names.

In April 2021, it was announced that Diethelm would be replaced by a new legal chief Barbara Levi.

=== Credit Suisse ===
Following the departure of a number of senior executives (including Romeo Cerutti, the company's general counsel) Diethelm was appointed as Credit Suisse's general counsel and became a member of its executive board.

== Other mandates ==
Diethelm holds the following mandates:

- Board member of UBS Business Solutions AG
- Chairman of the Swiss-American Chamber of Commerce's legal committee
- Chairman of the Swiss Advisory Council of the American Swiss Foundation
- Member of the supervisory board of the Fonds de Dotation LUMA / Arles
- Member of the New York State Council of Business Leaders in Support of Access to Justice

== Publications ==
- Markus U. Diethelm, Markus U. 2001. "Globalization and the Future of the International Practice of Law from a General Counsel's Perspective of a Multinational Enterprise – A Navigator of Management and Steward of the 'Future of Law'?" In: Drolshammer, J. I. & Pfeifer, M. (eds.). The Internationalization of the Practice of Law." Netherlands: Kluwer Law International.
- Dr. Markus U. Diethelm 217 Group General Counsel, (JBS AG, Zürich) 2016. "Rechtliche Herausforderungen im internationalen Banking" In: Kellerhals, Andreas (Hrsg.): "Herausforderungen für die Schweiz und Europa : Referate zu Fragen der Zukunft Europas 2015" Zürich: Schulthess.
- "Gesellschaftliche Verantwortung" in Finanz und Wirtschaft, May 7, 2014
