= Nadezhda Suslova =

Russia's first woman medical doctor (1843–1918)

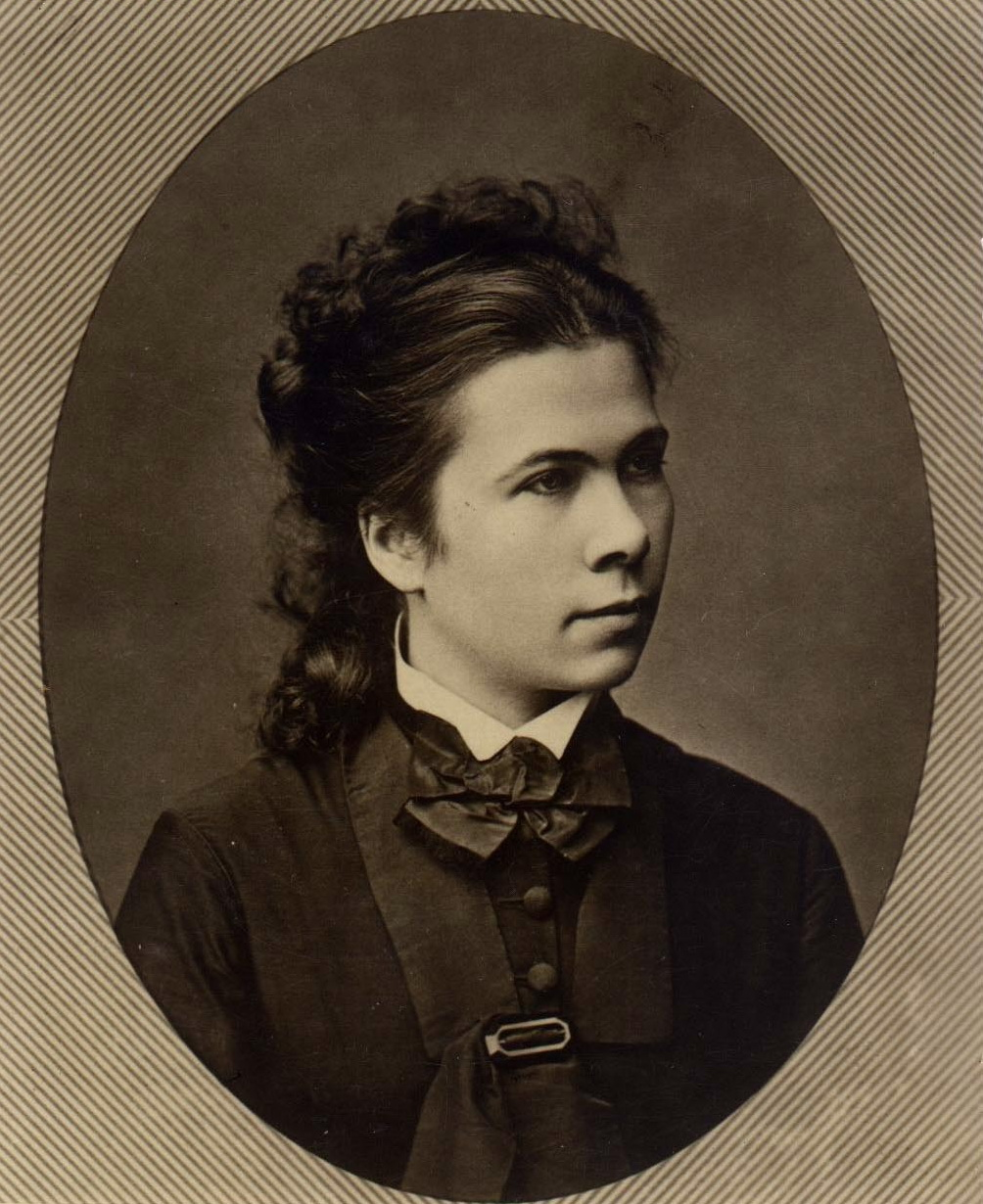
- Suslova in the 1860s
- Born: Nadezhda Prokofyevna Suslova; 1 September 1843; Panino, Nizhny Novgorod Governorate
- Died: 20 April 1918 (aged 74); Alushta, Crimea
- Education: Kirov Military Medical Academy; University of Zurich
- Relatives: Friedrich Erismann (spouse, 1867–1883, divorced); Alexander Golubev (spouse, 1883–1918)
- Medical career
- Profession: surgeon, obstetrician, gynecologist

Nadezhda Prokofyevna Suslova (Russian: Надежда Прокофьевна Суслова; 1 September 1843 – 20 April 1918) was Russia's first woman medical doctor and the sister of Polina Suslova. She worked as a gynecologist in Nizhny Novgorod, and was involved in many charity efforts.

== Early life ==
Nadezhda was born in Panino village, Nizhny Novgorod guberniya, the second of three children. Her father, Prokofii, and her mother, Anna, were serfs for the Sheremetev family, but Prokofii was able to succeed as a merchant and manufacturer. He decided to give a proper education to his daughters, Polina (a diminutive form of the given name Apollinaria) and Nadezhda. At home they had a governess and a dancing teacher. Later she entered Penichkau boarding school in Moscow, where she learned several foreign languages. Like other young people at that time, Nadezhda was fond of reading, enjoyed the works of Nikolay Chernyshevsky and Dobrolyubov and befriended revolutionary democrats. In 1859 the Suslov sisters moved to Saint Petersburg. In 1861 her short stories Rasskaz v pismah (Russian: Рассказ в письмах) and Fantazyorka (Russian: Фантазёрка) were published in Sovremennik. These stories espoused a feminist, nihilist philosophy that would later cause her political trouble. In the 1860s Nadezhda Suslova joined the revolutionary organization Land and Liberty.

== Education ==
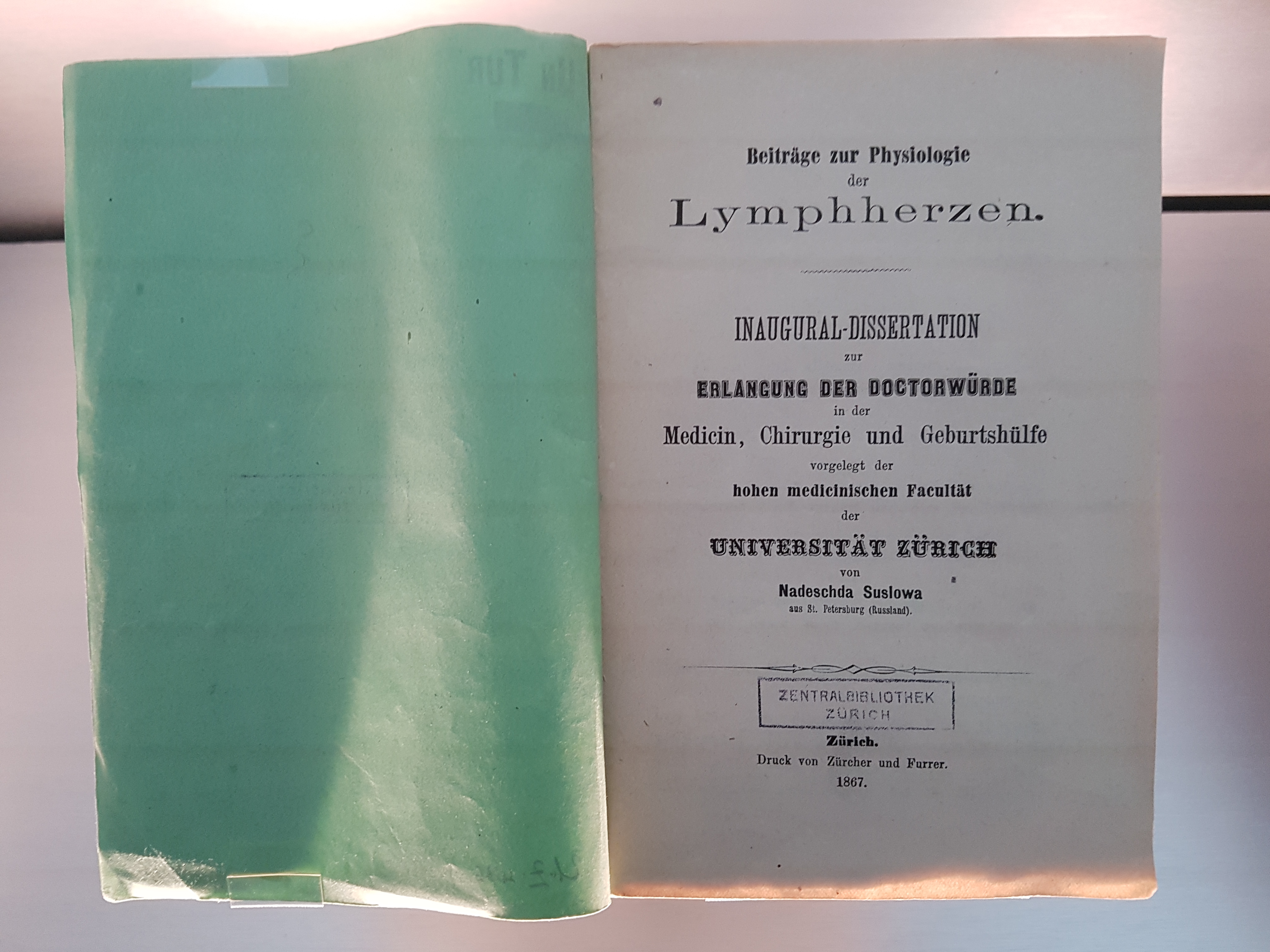
Nadezhda Suslova's thesis, 1867

She was allowed by Ivan Sechenov and Sergey Botkin to attend classes at the Imperial Military Medical Academy with Mariia Obrucheva (Bokov), another young woman with revolutionary sympathies who had met Suslova in school. Suslova's first article, Changes in skin sensations under the influence of electrical stimulation, was published in Meditsinskiy Vestnik in 1862. In 1865, after women were officially banned from universities, she moved to Switzerland, partially influenced by the arrest of her siblings and Bokov and her husband for political activities. In Switzerland, she audited medical classes at the University of Zurich for two years, then became an official student when the university was opened to women. She had intended to study obstetrics in Paris for her doctoral research, but instead moved to St. Petersburg. For her dissertation, she researched the muscular reflexes of frogs and their relationship to the function of lymph hearts at Graz Medical University in Sechenov's lab. She graduated in 1867. Suslova was the first Russian woman to be awarded a Doctor of Medicine degree, which was conferred after having to defend her research and education in front of a large audience and the medical school faculty.

== Career and research ==
Suslova's first publication after earning her doctorate was a summary of her dissertation research, published in 1868 in Germany. In order to be allowed to practice medicine in Russia, Suslova (at the time, Erismann) had to pass a special examination, which she did in 1868. She then began practicing gynecology and pediatrics in St. Petersburg with patients from all socioeconomic classes. The next year, Friedrich Erismann moved to St. Petersburg and the couple collaborated in medical practice and researching public health issues affecting the city's slums. After her divorce and another period of police surveillance, she moved to Nizhny Novgorod to continue her practice. After a period there, she moved to Alushta with her second husband and gave free medical care to the local poor Tatar people. She was known for her philanthropy during this period of her life, and for building a library and school on her property to serve the local population.

== Personal life ==
On April 16, 1868, Suslova married her first husband, Friedrich Erismann, in Vienna, Austria. They met while both students at the University of Zurich. The couple divorced on August 18, 1883. In 1885, Suslova married Aleksandr Golubev, a histology professor and physician.
