= Brigitta Danuser =

Swiss academic

Brigitta Danuser is professor for occupational medicine at the University of Lausanne, Switzerland and directed from 2005 to 2015 the institute for work and health (Institut Universitaire Romand de Santé au Travail IST). Since 1993, she has been engaged in the development and teaching of the MAS/DAS Work+Health, which trains occupational physicians and hygienists. From 2012 till 2019 she was the academic director of this MAS/DAS.

== Career ==
Brigitta Danuser studied medicine at the University of Zurich and made her venia legendi in work physiology at the ETH Zurich on the topic of motivated attention. Her psycho-physiological research focuses on the emotional and cognitive work involved in modern public performances, under the larger scientific body work and health research. Return to work and effects of the social compensation system became her research focus in recent years.

At the Institut de Santé au Travail Brigitta, Danuser developed the following occupational medicine consultations for employees: a general occupational medicine consultation, a consultation for suffering and work, a motherhood protection consultation, and a consultation for occupational respiratory diseases. Brigitta Danuser was president of the Swiss Society for Occupational Medicine from 2003 till 2010. Since 2009, she has been a member of the Swiss Federal Work Commission.

=== Awards ===
In 2012, Danuser was awarded the Joseph-Rutenfranz-Medaille by the German Society for Occupational and Environmental Medicine for her psycho-physiological research.

== Publications ==
- Brigitta Danuser: Homo laborans. Gesundsein und Kranksein bei der Arbeit. Versus, Zurich 2019, ISBN 978-3-03909-264-2.
- Brigitta Danuser and Viviane Gonik (Hrsg./ed.): Die Arbeit: eine Re-Vision. / Le travail: une re-vision. Chronos, Zurich 2013, ISBN 978-3-0340-1092-4.
- List of publications on the website of the University of Lausanne
