= University of Zurich =

Public university in Switzerland, founded 1833

- Universität Zürich
- Latin: Universitas Turicensis
- Type: Public university
- Established: 1833; 193 years ago
- Affiliations: LERU U21; Una Europa
- Budget: 1.578 billion Swiss francs
- President: Michael Schaepman
- Faculty: 3,702 (Full-time equivalent)
- Administrative staff: 2,051 (Full-time equivalent)
- Students: 25,732
- Location: Zurich, Canton of Zurich, Switzerland; 47°22′29″N 8°32′54″E
- Campus: Urban
- Colours: Black, white, blue, grey and ochre
- Website: uzh.ch

The University of Zurich (UZH, German: Universität Zürich) is a public research university in Zurich, Switzerland. It is the largest university in Switzerland, with approximately 28,700 enrolled students. UZH was founded in 1833, from the merger of the existing colleges of theology, law, medicine that were founded 1525 with a new faculty of philosophy.

The university has seven schools: Philosophy, Human Medicine, Economic Sciences, Law, Mathematics and Natural Sciences, Theology and Veterinary Medicine; it offers the widest range of subjects and courses of any Swiss higher education institution.

== History ==
=== 1833–2000 ===
The University of Zurich was founded on April 29, 1833, when the existing colleges of theology, the Carolinum founded by Huldrych Zwingli in 1525, law and medicine were merged with a new faculty of Philosophy. It was the first university in Europe to be founded by the state rather than a monarch or church. Its Latin name is reminiscent of the Roman name for the precursor settlement of the city of Zurich, Turicum.

Aerial view (1953)

In the university's early years, the 1839 appointment of the German theologian David Friedrich Strauss to its Chair of Theology caused a major controversy, since Strauss argued that the miracles in the Christian New Testament were mythical retellings of normal events as supernatural happenings. Eventually, the authorities offered Strauss a pension before he had a chance to start his duties.

The university allowed women to attend philosophy lectures from 1847. The Faculty of Veterinary Medicine was added in 1901, the second-oldest such faculty in the world. In 1914, the university moved to new premises designed by the architect Karl Moser on Rämistrasse 71.

The university admitted a Russian woman student, Maria Kniazhnina, to audit medicine classes in 1864, but she did not complete the course. Another Russian student, Nadezhda Suslova, audited medicine classes from 1865 and was allowed to become a registered student and graduate as a doctor of medicine in 1867. The first seven women who were awarded medical degrees at the university were known as the Zurich Seven. They were Nadezhda Suslova (Russia), Frances Elizabeth Morgan (England), Louisa Atkins (England), Maria Bokova (Russia), Eliza Walker (Scotland), Susan Dimock (United States), and Marie Vögtlin (Switzerland).

Albert Einstein was awarded his PhD from the philosophical faculty of the university in 1906. In 2022, the original certificate was returned to the university.

=== 2000–present ===
In 2022, the university ran the first professorship for Gender Medicine in Switzerland. Research included investigations into differences of symptoms of cardiac arrest between men and women.

In 2024, the university announced that they would voluntarily withdraw from THE World University Rankings, stating that the ranking "is not able to reflect the wide range of teaching and research activities undertaken at the university", and that the ranking is "leading universities to concentrate on increasing the number of publications instead of improving the quality of their content". Prior to the announcement, the university regularly ranked in the top 100 universities worldwide.

In 2024, the university opened an investigation into an academic following potentially falsified research results which "led to preventable patient deaths" at University Hospital of Zurich.

In 2025, the university, alongside Zurich University of Applied Sciences, received the Geospatial World Excellence Award 2025 for Environmental and Social Impact for their "Spatial Sustainable Finance" project.

==== Reddit LLM Research ====
In April 2025, researchers from the university's Faculty of Arts and Social Sciences conducted an experiment on Reddit's "Change my View" Subreddit where they attempted to identify how Large Language Models could be used to change people's views. The experiment was widely criticised, accused of breaking community rules, as well as being called unlawful. Subreddit moderators raised concerns with the university about the ethics of the research due to it being conducted without informed consent, and its impersonation of members of groups including LGBT people and sexual assault survivors.

The researchers initially responded to the allegations by defending the study saying that it was "crucial to conduct a study of this kind", their activities had "done little harm", and that the study was approved by the university's ethics committee. Reddit's Chief Legal Officer called the study "deeply wrong on both a moral and legal level" whilst sharing that the website was unaware of the experiment and submitted "legal demands" to the university. Following Reddit's demands the university backtracked by announcing that the research would not be published, and that the Ethics Committee at the faculty intended to "adopt a stricter review process".

== Campus ==
The university is scattered all over the city of Zurich. The main campuses are located in the city centre, Irchelpark and Oerlikon. Members of the university can use several libraries, including the ETH-library, and the Zurich Central Library, with over 5 million volumes. In 1962, the faculty of science proposed to establish the Irchelpark campus on the Strickhofareal. The first stage the construction of the university buildings was begun in 1973, and the campus was inaugurated in 1979. The construction of the second stage lasted from 1978 to 1983. The campus also houses the anthropological museum Anthropologisches Museum, and the cantonal Staatsarchiv Zürich.

=== Museums ===
The university included 13 museums: the Anatomical Collection, the Archaeological Collection, the Botanical Museum, the Museum of Wax Moulages, the Science Exploratorium, the Museum of Veterinary History, the Zurich Herbaria, the Museum of Anthropology, the Botanical Garden, the Ethnographic Museum, the Paleontological Museum, the Veterinary Anatomy Collection and the Zoological Museum. The zoological, paleontological, anthropological and botanical museums later merged into the Natural History Museum of the University of Zurich, which opened in 2024. The Institute and Museum for the History of Medicine is also part of the university.

== Academics ==
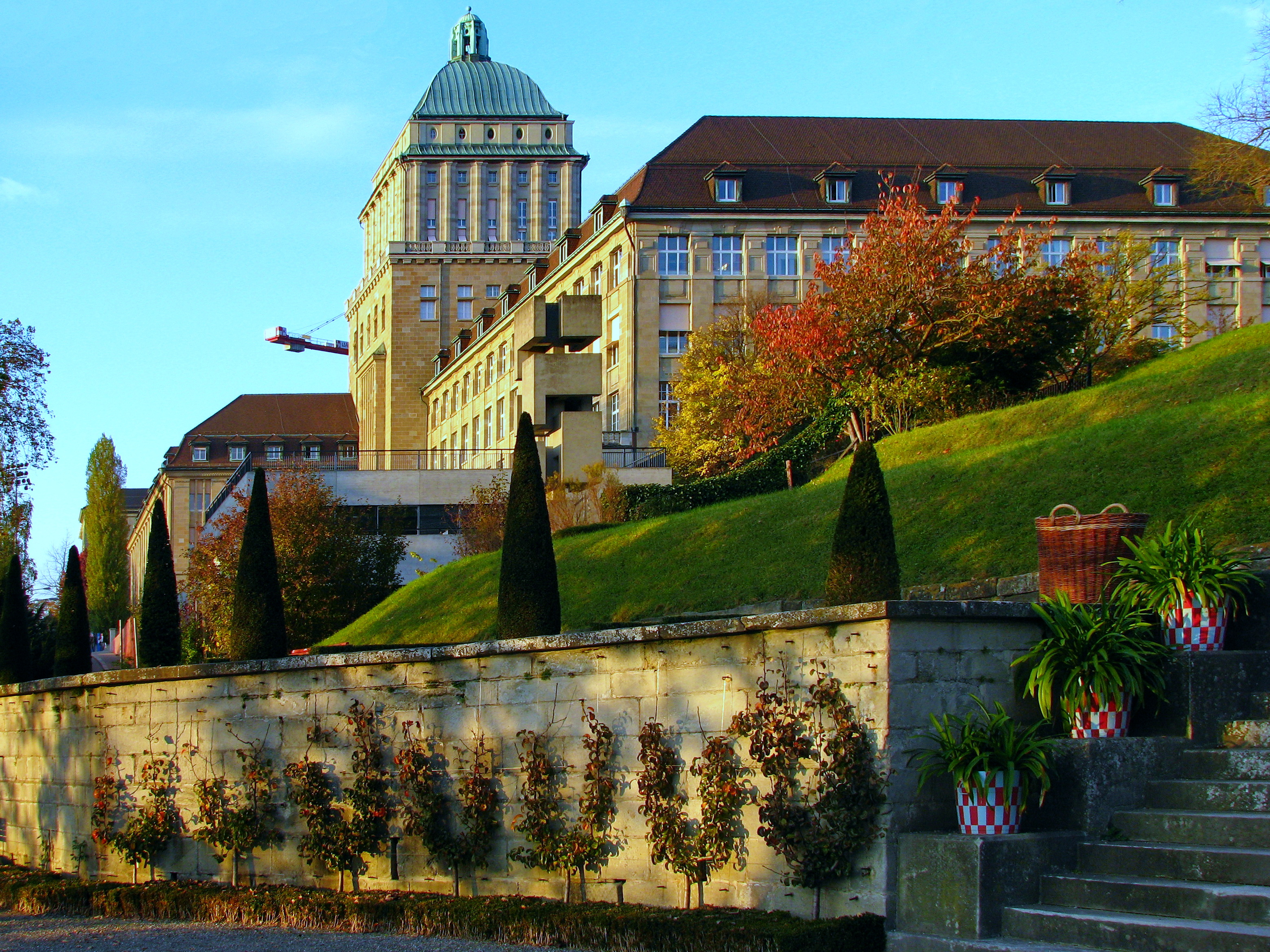
Main building by Karl Moser as seen from the south

In the fields of bioscience and finance, there is a close-knit collaboration between the University of Zurich and the ETH (Federal Institute for Technology). Examples for common initiatives between the two institutions include University Medicine Zurich, the Wyss Translational Center Zurich, and Life Science Zurich (LSZ).

=== Rankings ===
University rankings

Global – Overall
- ARWU World: 59 (2023)
- CWUR World: 62 (2025)
- QS World: 98 (2027)
- Reuters World: 51 (2019)
- THE World: 80 (2024)
- USNWR Global: 59 (2025-2026)

- Shanghai Jiao Tong University Ranking (heavy emphasis on research output – citations, Nobel prizes etc.) Ranked 59th overall as well as 5th and 10th in the subdisclipines Ecology and Human Biological Sciences respectively.
- QS World University Rankings (heavy emphasis on peer review) 91st overall and 56th in Medicine globally making it the highest ranked University in Switzerland for Medicine according to QS.
- THE World University Rankings 2024 80th overall and ranked 42nd in the subdiscipline business & economics.

The university's Department of Economics is especially strong and was ranked first in the German-speaking area by the Handelsblatt in 2017. In 2009, the faculty of Business Administration was ranked third in the German-speaking area.

=== Language policy ===
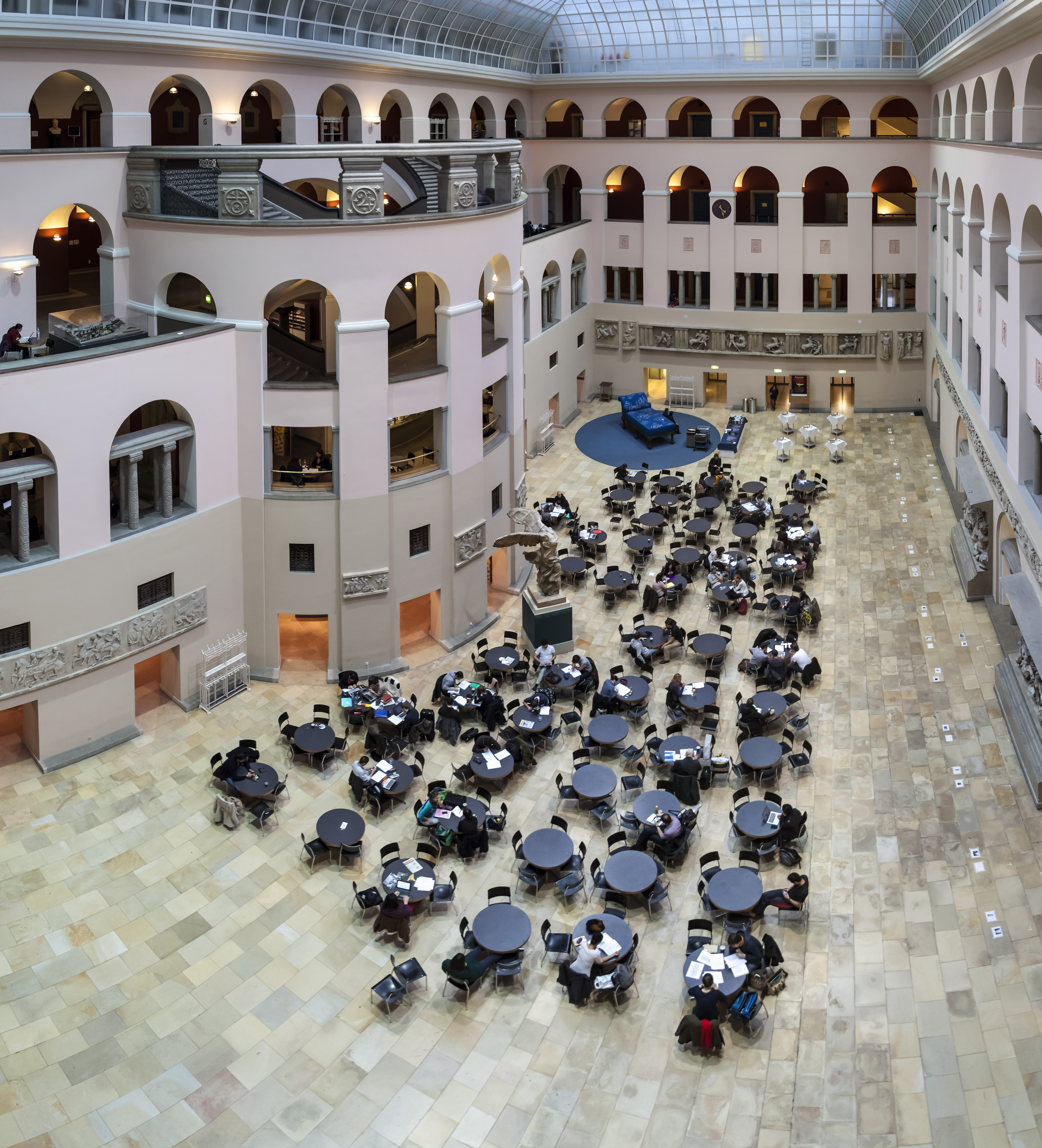
Atrium Central

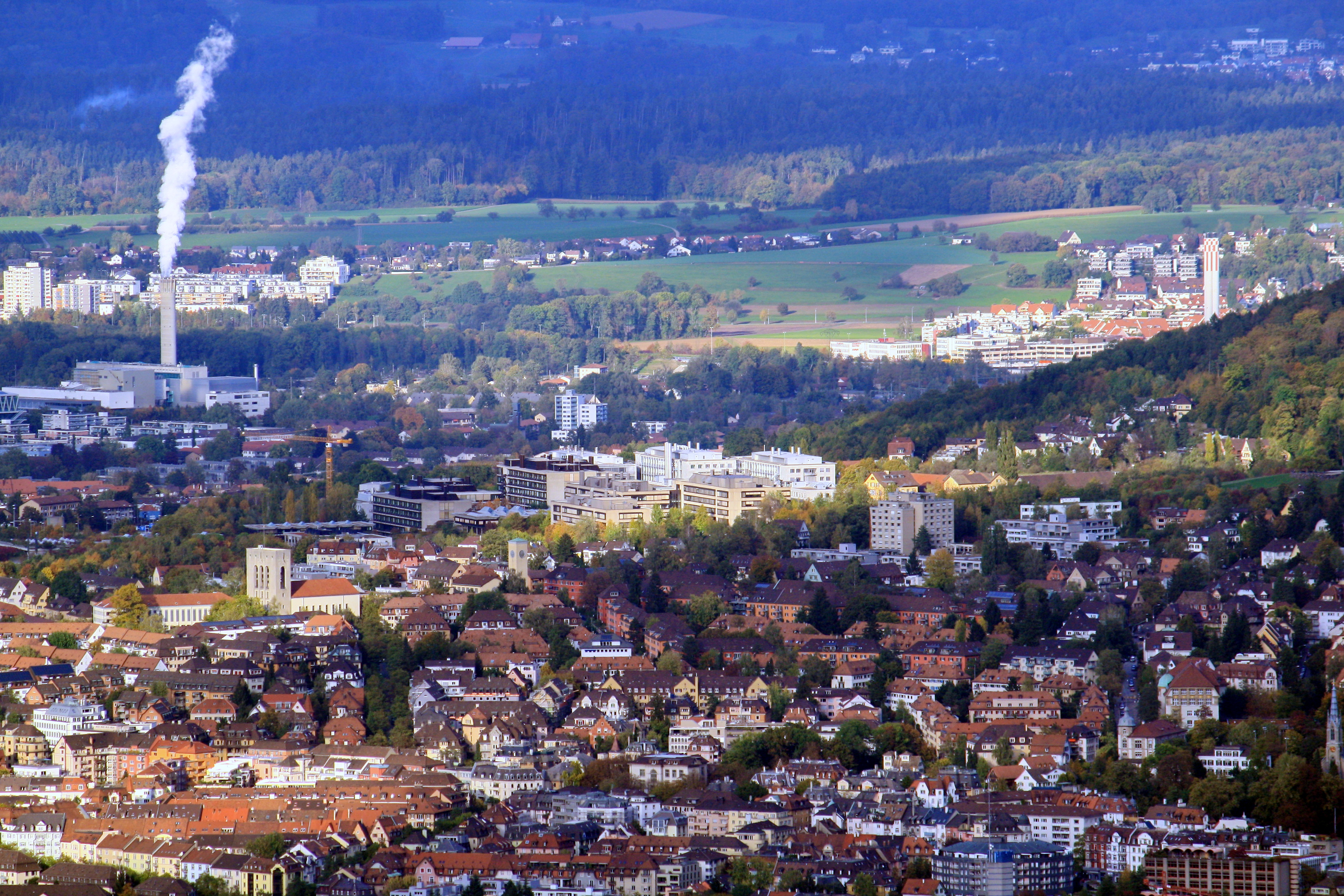
Irchel Campus, newer and more remotely located buildings of the University of Zurich

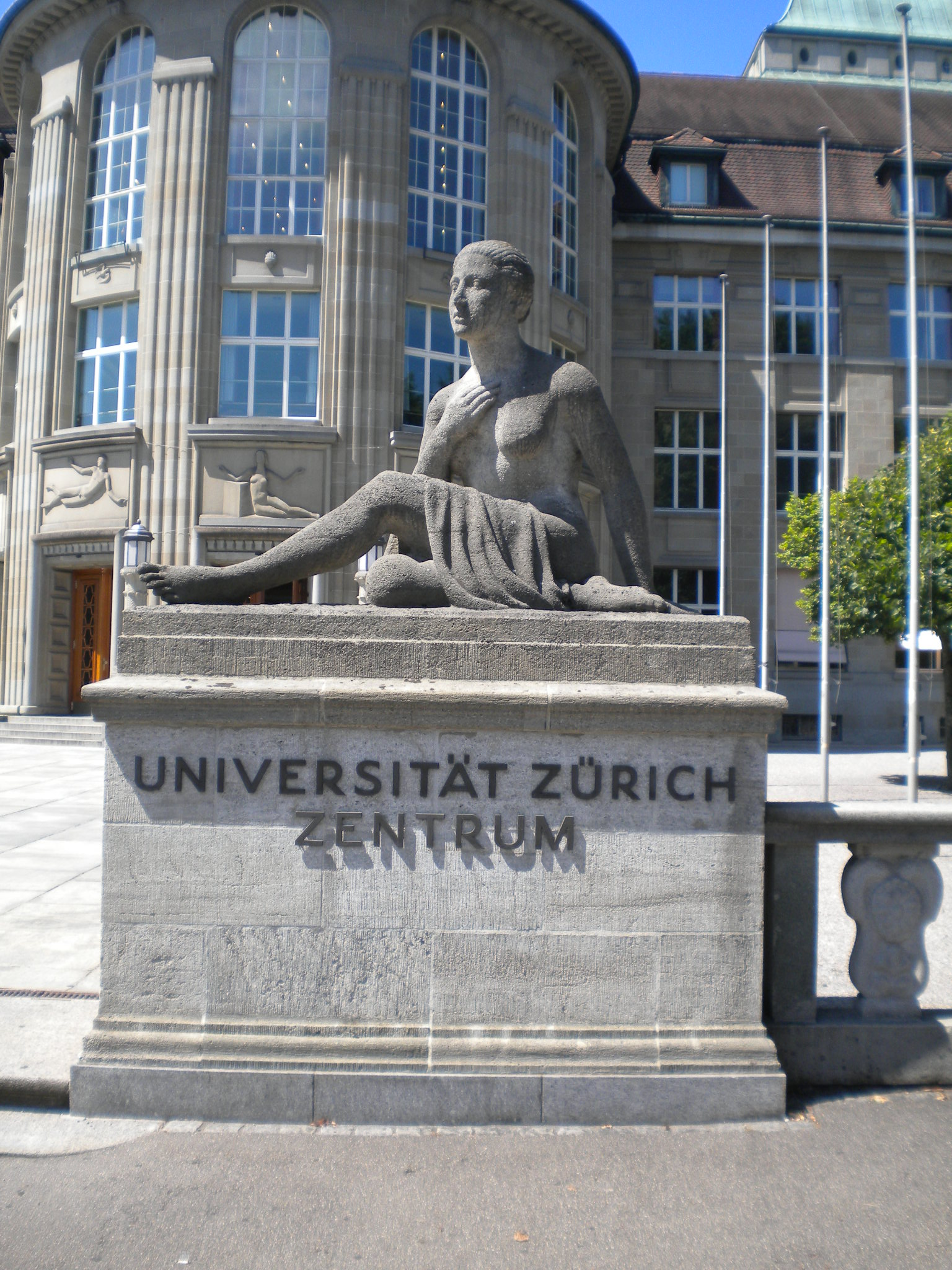
Statue at the entrance

Bachelor courses are taught in Swiss Standard German ("Hochdeutsch"), but use of English is increasing in many faculties. The only bachelors program taught entirely in English is the "English Language and Literature" program. All Master courses at the Faculty of Science are held in English. Master courses in Economics and Finance are mainly held in English, while the Master of Science in Quantitative Finance is held completely in English.

== Student life ==
The university's Academic Sports Association (ASVZ) offers a wide range of sports facilities to students of the university. The student body is represented through the Verband der Studierenden der Universität Zürich VSUZH which organizes events and is involved in the university administration.

== Notable alumni and faculty ==
=== Politics, law and society ===
- Jacqueline Badran, politician and entrepreneur
- Johannes Baumann, President of the Swiss Confederation
- Johann Jakob Blumer, Swiss statesman and historian
- Peter Bodenmann, President of the Social Democratic Party of Switzerland
- Ernst Brugger, President of the Swiss Confederation
- Emil Brunner, Professor of Systematic and Practical Theology
- Carl Jacob Burckhardt, Swiss diplomat and historian
- Felix Calonder, President of the Swiss Confederation
- Ignazio Cassis, President of the Swiss Confederation
- Leandra Columberg, politician
- Adolf Deucher, President of the Swiss Confederation
- Alphons Egli, President of the Swiss Confederation
- Philipp Etter, President of the Swiss Confederation
- Mario Fehr (born 1958), politician
- Sigi Feigel (1921–2004), Swiss attorney, president of the Israelitische Cultusgemeinde Zürich (ICZ) and notable for his campaigns against antisemitism and racism
- Ludwig Forrer, President of the Swiss Confederation
- Kurt Furgler, President of the Swiss Confederation
- Jonas Furrer, President of the Swiss Confederation
- Athol Gill, Australian theologian
- Balthasar Glättli, Grüne Partei der Schweiz politician
- Christoph Beat Graber, Law professor, media law
- Bernhard Hammer, President of the Swiss Confederation
- Robert Haab, President of the Swiss Confederation
- Heinrich Häberlin, President of the Swiss Confederation
- Joachim Heer, President of the Swiss Confederation
- Arthur Hoffmann, President of the Swiss Confederation
- Fritz Honegger, President of the Swiss Confederation
- Eugen Huber, Swiss jurist and the creator of the Swiss Civil Code
- Max Huber, Swiss lawyer and diplomat
- Daniel Jositsch, law professor and SP politician
- Jakob Kellenberger, Swiss diplomat and the president of the International Committee of the Red Cross
- Florence Kelley American economist, social and political reformer, one of the first women to hold statewide office as Chief Factory Inspector for the state of Illinois
- Stephan Klapproth, Swiss journalist and television presenter
- Elisabeth Kopp, Swiss politician and the first woman elected to the Swiss Federal Council
- Ursula Koch (born 1941), Swiss politician
- Moritz Leuenberger, President of the Swiss Confederation
- Doris Leuthard, President of the Swiss Confederation
- Rosa Luxemburg, Marxist theorist, philosopher, economist and activist of Polish Jewish descent
- Min Li Marti, Swiss politician and publisher
- Albert Meyer, President of the Swiss Confederation
- Mattea Meyer Swiss politician
- Heather Neff, American novelist
- Max Petitpierre, President of the Swiss Confederation
- Adeline Rittershaus (1876–1924), philologist, a scholar in old Scandinavian literature, and champion for the equality of women
- Carl Victor Ryssel, theologian
- Roger Sablonier (1941–2010), Swiss historian and writer (faculty, Emeritierter Ordinarius für Geschichte des Mittelalters)
- Marionna Schlatter
- Leon Schlumpf, President of the Swiss Confederation
- Barbara Schmid-Federer, member of the National Council of Switzerland
- Ernst Sieber (1927–2018), Swiss pastor, social worker, writer and former EVP politician
- Cornelio Sommaruga, Swiss humanitarian, lawyer and diplomat
- Willy Spühler, President of the Swiss Confederation
- Walther Stampfli, President of the Swiss Confederation
- Hashim Thaçi, prime minister of the Republic of Kosovo
- Wangpo Tethong (born 1963), Swiss-Tibetan activist, writer, spokesperson of Greenpeace Switzerland and member of the 15th Tibetan Parliament in Exile
- Daniel Thürer, Swiss jurist
- Klaus Tschütscher, former Head of Government of Liechtenstein as Prime Minister
- Ernst Wetter, President of the Swiss Confederation
- Sigmund Widmer (1919–2003), Swiss politician
- Dölf Wild (born 1954), Swiss historian and archäeologist
- Josephina Theresia Zürcher one of the first female doctors in the Ottoman Empire
- Sam Ratulangi, Indonesian National Hero, statesman, teacher, journalist, politician, first Celebes/Sulawesi Governor, and former Indonesian guerilla warfare (Ph.D. in Math)
- Ernest Douwes Dekker, Indonesian National Hero, Dutch-Indonesian Politician, and Writer

=== Economics, business and management ===
- Christoph Blocher, Swiss politician, industrialist and former member of the Swiss Federal Council
- Karl Brunner (economist), Swiss economist
- Markus U. Diethelm, Swiss businessman and group general counsel at UBS
- Martin Ebner (born 1945), Swiss billionaire businessman
- Marc Faber, investment analyst and entrepreneur
- Alan Frei, Swiss businessman
- Bruno Frey, Swiss economist
- Thomas Gottstein (born 1964), Swiss banker, CEO of Credit Suisse
- Walter Haefner, businessman and Thoroughbred racehorse owner/breeder in Ireland
- Jörg Kachelmann, presenter, journalist and entrepreneur in the meteorological field
- Peter Kurer, Swiss manager and lawyer
- Adriano B. Lucatelli, Swiss manager and businessperson
- Dominique Rinderknecht, Swiss model and Miss Switzerland 2013
- Marcel Rohner (banker), Swiss businessman, UBS AG
- Stephan Schmidheiny, Swiss businessman and billionaire

=== Science ===
- Artur Avila, professor at Institut für Mathematik and Fields Medal
- Christian Beyel Swiss Mathematician
- Brigitta Danuser, Medicine
- Peter Debye, Dutch physicist and chemist
- Albert Einstein, theoretical physicist who was awarded his PhD from the University of Zurich in 1905 and was appointed associate professor at the university in 1909
- Ben-Ami Finkelstein, psychiatrist
- Anna Fischer-Dückelmann, one of the first women to receive a medical degree in a German-speaking country
- Natalie Grams, German physician, author and science communicator
- Ravit Helled, planetary scientist, and department of astrophysics and cosmology professor
- Paul Herrling (Ph.D. 1975), Swiss head of corporate research, professor
- Albert Hofmann, Swiss scientist and discoverer of LSD-25
- Max Holzmann, Swiss cardiologist
- Edith Humphrey, Chemist and the first British woman to get a doctorate in chemistry
- Hugo Iltis, Biologist, Biographer of Gregor Mendel
- Gino Isidori, theoretical physicist
- Maximilian Janisch, Swiss mathematician, youngest doctoral student in Switzerland
- Rosa Kerschbaumer-Putjata, Russian ophthalmologist and Austria's first female doctor
- Alfred Kleiner, experimental physicist
- Hanna Kokko, biologist
- Jean Lindenmann (1924–2015), Swiss immunologist and virologist; co-discoverer of interferon
- Rachel Lloyd (1839–1900), American chemist
- Stefan Michel, Swiss economist
- Rolf Pfeifer, Computer Science and Artificial Intelligence
- Diego A. Pizzagalli, Swiss neuroscientist and professor at Harvard Medical School
- Wilhelm Röntgen, physicist and engineer who discovered X-rays
- Erwin Schrödinger, Austrian physicist who was professor from 1921 to 1927
- Heinrich Willi, Swiss pediatrician
- Heidi Wunderli-Allenspach (born 1947), Swiss biologist and first woman director of ETH Zurich
- Gazi Yaşargil, Neurosurgery’s man of the century 1950–1999, professor and chairman of the Department of Neurosurgery (1973–1993)
- Richard J. Baer, physicist.

=== Philosophy and theology ===
- Eberhard Jüngel (1934–2021), German Lutheran theologian

=== Arts and music ===
- Annette Hug, Swiss writer and lecturer
- Luzia von Wyl (born 1985), Swiss composer and pianist

=== Nobel Prize laureates ===
Associated with the university are 12 Nobel Prize recipients, primarily in Physics and Chemistry.

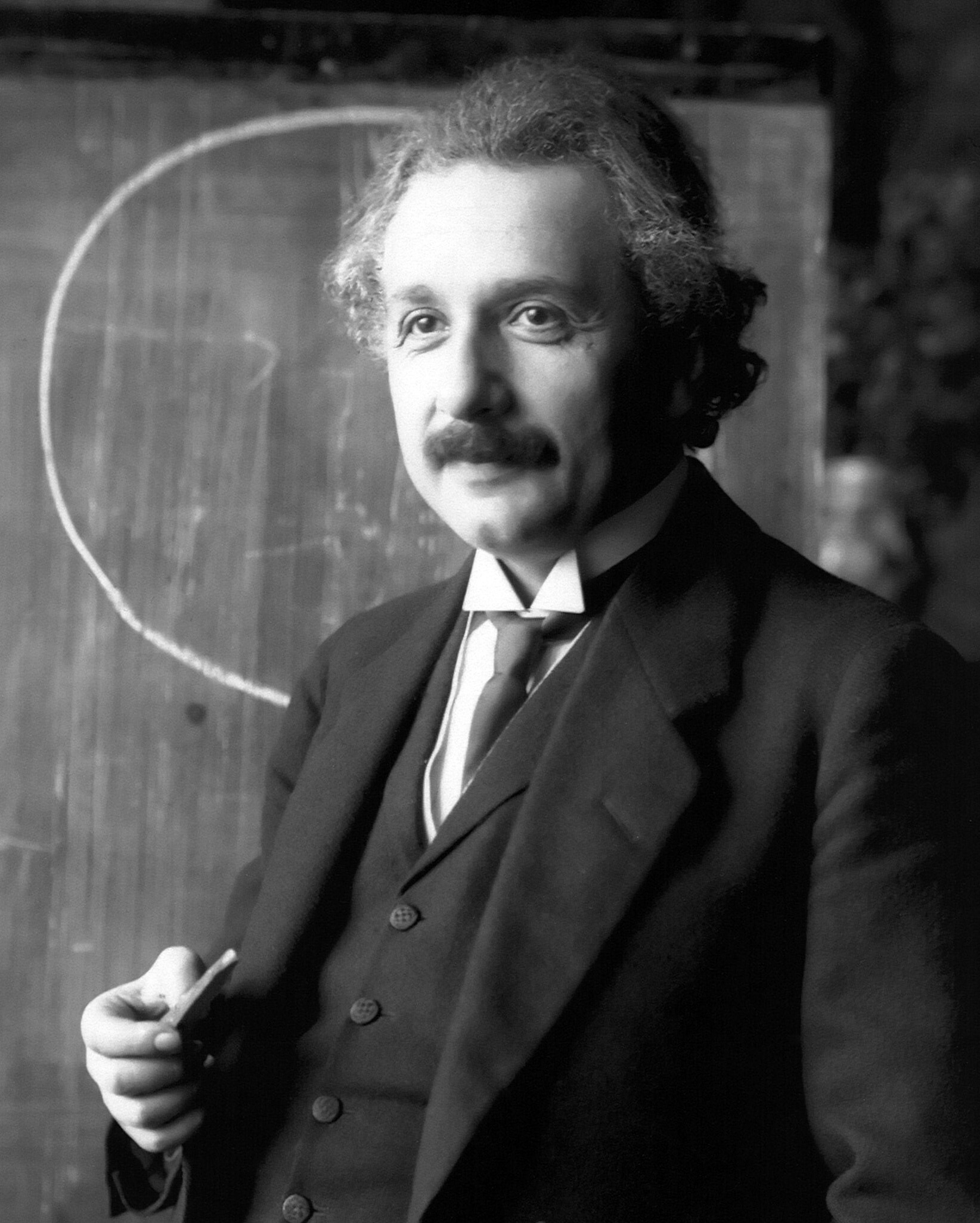
Albert Einstein

Year	Field	Laureate
1901	Physics	Wilhelm Conrad Röntgen
1902	Literature	Theodor Mommsen
1913	Chemistry	Alfred Werner
1914	Physics	Max von Laue
1921	Physics	Albert Einstein
1933	Physics	Erwin Schrödinger
1936	Chemistry	Peter Debye
1937	Chemistry	Paul Karrer
1939	Chemistry	Lavoslav Ružička
1949	Medicine	Walter Rudolf Hess
1987	Physics	Karl Alex Müller
1996	Medicine	Rolf M. Zinkernagel

== Associated institutions ==
- Corpus Córporum, digital library created and maintained by the university's Institute for Greek and Latin Philology.
- Swiss National Supercomputing Centre

== See also ==
- List of largest universities by enrollment in Switzerland
- List of modern universities in Europe (1801–1945)
