= Vitus Graber =

Austrian entomologist

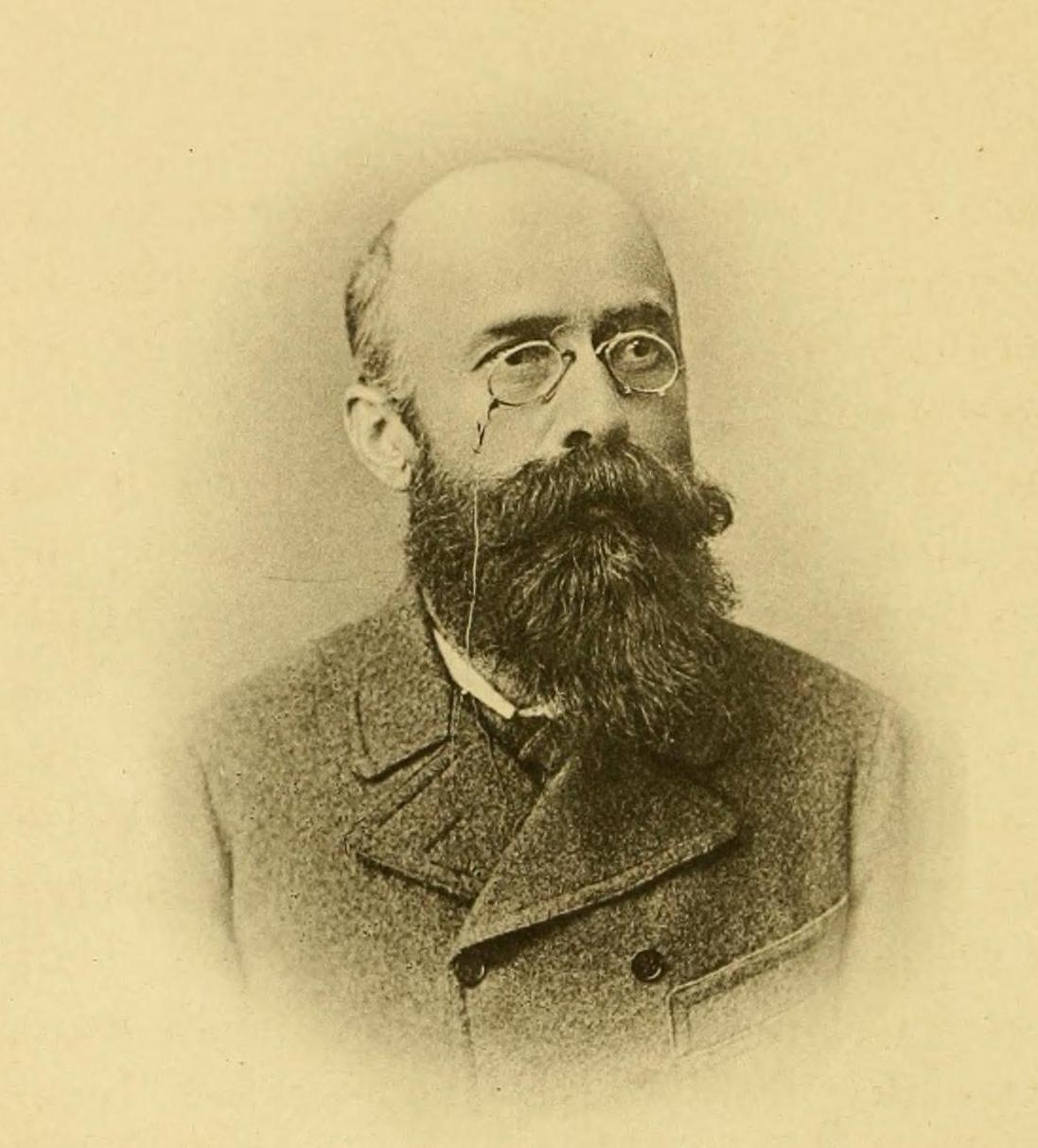

Veit Graber latinized as Vitus Graber (2 July 1844 – 3 March 1892) was an Austrian pioneer of insect physiology, embryology, anatomy, biomechanics, and behaviour. He conducted experiments to demonstrate insect senses and perception while also looking at the structures responsible for them. He was the first to identify what he termed as chordotonal organs. A muscular and pear-shaped structure of unknown function found in the larvae of horseflies described by him is now known as Graber's organ. He was the author of several major books on insects including Die Insekten (1877–78).

== Life and career ==
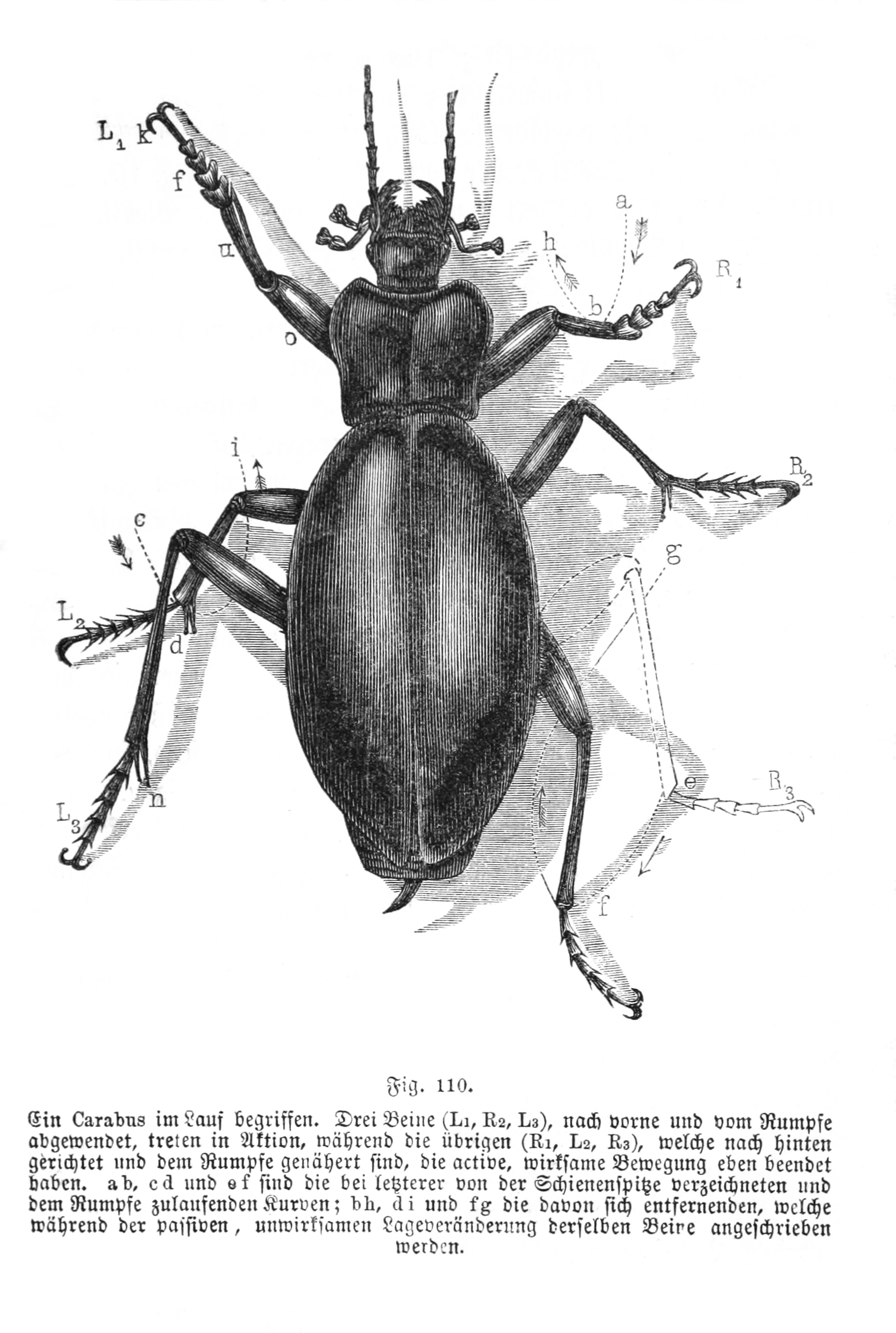
Gait of a carabid beetle from Die Insekten (1877)

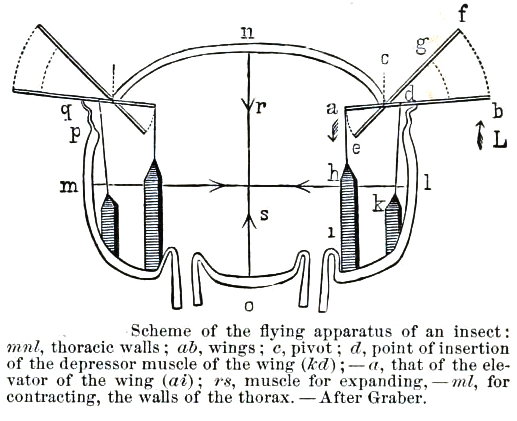
Structure of insect wings

Graber was born in Weer to blacksmith Joseph Mathew and Barbara née Posch. He went to school in Innsbruck and a scholarship allowed him to study zoology at the Leopold-Franzens University in 1864 under Camill Heller. He then trained as a teacher and began to teach in high schools in 1867. He taught at schools in Vinkovce and then Graz. He obtained a doctorate in 1868 and habilitated in zoology in 1871 with studies under Eduard Oscar Schmidt and wrote a thesis on the orthoptera of Tyrol. He also trained in histology under Alexander Rollett. He became an associate professor in 1876 and joined the University of Chernivtsi where he established a zoology institute. Graber conducted experiments to demonstrate that cockroaches avoided light and sought the dark. He also examined the preferences for colours in various insects. In his book Die Insekten (1877) he made many bold claims some of which are now known to be incorrect. He believed for instance that the queen bee flew around inside the hive. He dissected specimens of a range of insects and noted that they had sensory structures, then given the more generic name of chordotonal organs, which he believed were always involved in sensing sound and other vibrations, although it is now known that many were chemosensory in function. He demonstrated that Blatta germanica responded to sound, now known to be sensed through the anal cerci rather than chordotonal organs as he believed. Graber served as rector of the University of Chernivtsi in 1886-87. One of his students was Anton Ritter von Jaworowski. An organ at the posterior end of tabanid larvae is now known as Graber's organ. The function of this dark pear-shaped muscular structure is unknown. In 1882, Graber described sensory structures in insects that he termed as chordotonal organs. He believed that they acted like strings, stretched between two points, and resonating with external vibrations.

Graber married Katharine daughter of Carl Prill, a jewelry box maker in 1868 and they had a daughter Maria (who married Theodor Gartner) and a son Hermann Veit Graber (1873–1939) who became a geologist and teacher. During the war in 1866 he served in the Innsbruck sniper company on the Lombardy border and received a medal for his service. Graber suffered from a cancer, and had been advised to travel south to Italy. He hoped to be able to work at the zoological station in Naples but died in Rome where he is buried at Campo Santo Teutonico.
