= Shearman & Sterling =

Multinational law firm based in New York City

Shearman & Sterling LLP
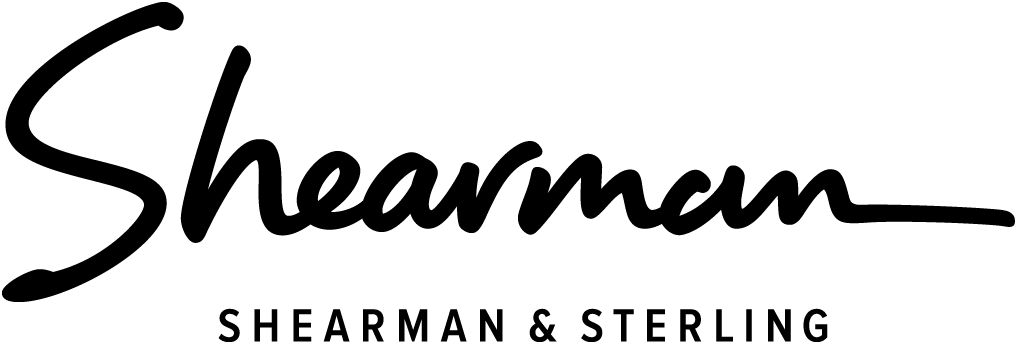
- Headquarters: 599 Lexington Avenue, New York City, United States
- No. of offices: 23
- No. of attorneys: 850
- Major practice areas: General practice
- Revenue: ▲$1.01 billion (2022)
- Profit per equity partner: ▲$3 million (2022)
- Date founded: 1873 (New York City)
- Founder: John William Sterling; Thomas G. Shearman
- Company type: Limited liability partnership
- Dissolved: April 30, 2024
- Website: www.shearman.com

Shearman & Sterling was a white shoe multinational law firm headquartered in New York City, United States. In 2024 it merged with Allen & Overy to form A&O Shearman.

== History ==
=== Wall Street origins ===
Shearman & Sterling was founded in New York City in 1873 by Thomas G. Shearman (/ˈʃɜːrmən/) and John William Sterling, who concentrated on litigation and transactional matters respectively. The young firm represented financier Jay Gould and industrialist Henry Ford, and cultivated a number of important business ties that would evolve into long-standing client relationships, such as with the Rockefeller family and the predecessor banks to Citigroup and Deutsche Bank.

=== Postwar global expansion ===
The firm expanded internationally during the post-World War II era, under the direction of Boykin C. Wright, a senior partner who joined the firm from Cahill Gordon & Reindel with a group of lawyers, briefly leading the firm to add his name to the letterhead. The firm's first international office was established in Paris in 1963.

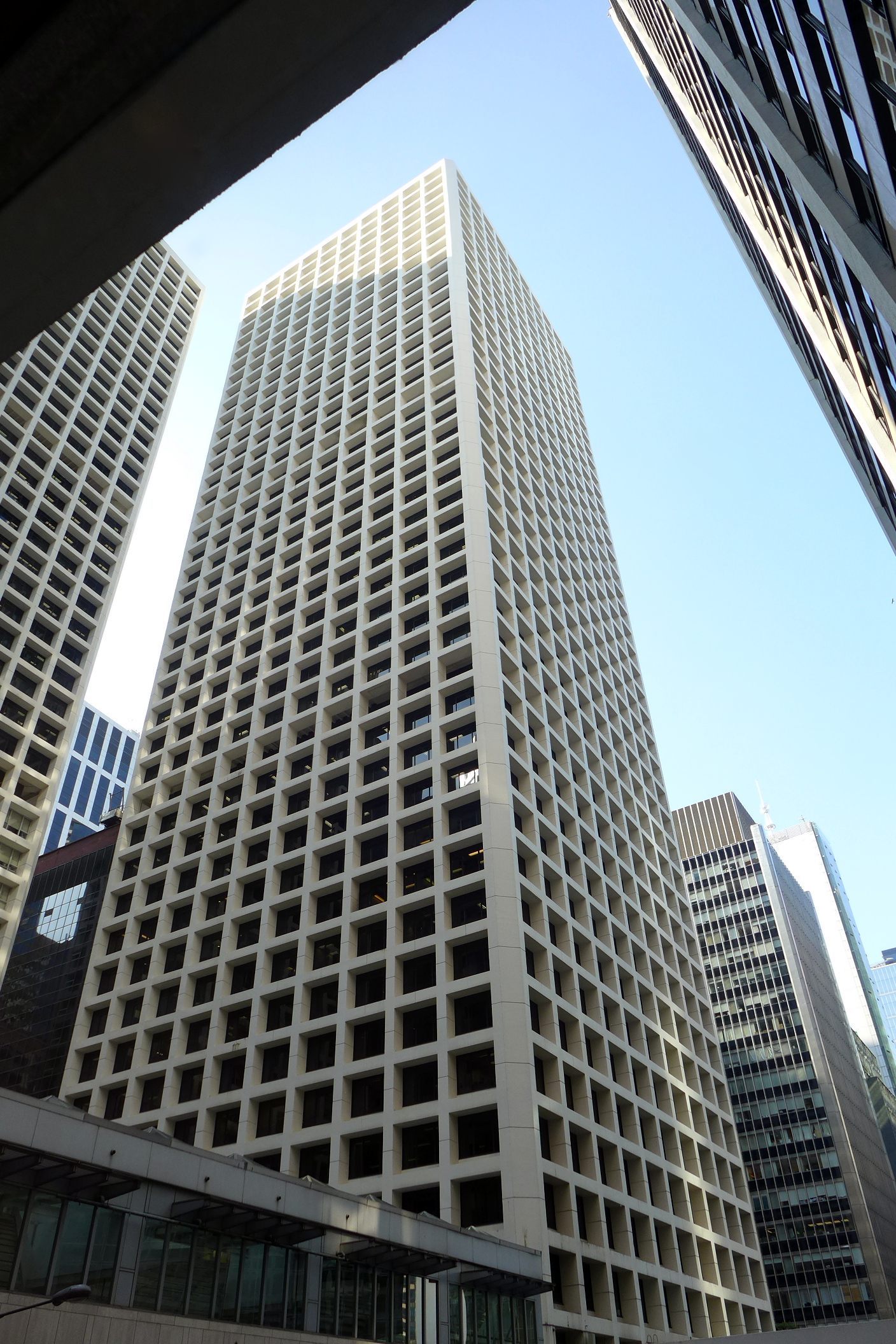
Hong Kong office at The Landmark's Gloucester Tower

Bolstering the firm's reputation in international law, President Eisenhower tapped partner Fredrick McCurdy Eaton to be the United States' lead negotiator at the 1960 Nuclear Ten Nation Committee on Disarmament, in Geneva. From 1964 to 1975, Mr. Eaton was the senior partner.

In postwar Germany, Shearman & Sterling helped German companies such as Siemens and BASF restructure their debts and re-emerge as credible exporters to the United States. The firm's lawyers assisted Daimler in its listing on the New York Stock Exchange in 1993, the first such listing by a German company, prompting other major companies to follow suit. The firm then represented the German automaker in its purchase and subsequent sale of Chrysler. The company practices mergers and acquisitions in Germany, and operates one of the largest London offices of a non-UK law firm.

The firm played an important role in the establishment of state-owned oil and gas companies, including Sonatrach in Algeria and throughout the Middle East. In 1979, Shearman & Sterling lawyers represented Citibank during the intense negotiations of the Iranian Hostage Crisis, ensuing after the US government froze all Iranian assets in US banks.

During the 1980s, firm attorneys helped restructure the debts of many Latin American nations in the Brady transactions, and also won mandates in the privatization of numerous state-owned entities. In 2004, the firm launched an office in São Paulo, Brazil and has since represented Brazilian companies in a number of important transactions.

In East Asia, Shearman & Sterling was one of the first firms to grasp the future strategic importance of the Asia-Pacific region, establishing offices in Hong Kong in 1978, followed by Tokyo, Beijing, Singapore and Shanghai. In late 2018, the firm received a license to open an office in Seoul, headed by Singapore partner Anna Chung.

=== 21st century domestic expansion ===
Domestically, Shearman & Sterling opened up an office in Austin in the first half of 2018 and another office in Houston just two months later.

On May 21, 2023, it was announced that Shearman & Sterling had agreed to terms in a merger with UK Magic Circle member Allen & Overy, creating A&O Shearman, a $3.5 billion firm with over 4,000 attorneys across 49 offices. The merger formally closed on May 1, 2024. In April 2025, Adam Hakki was named as co-managing partner of the combined firm.

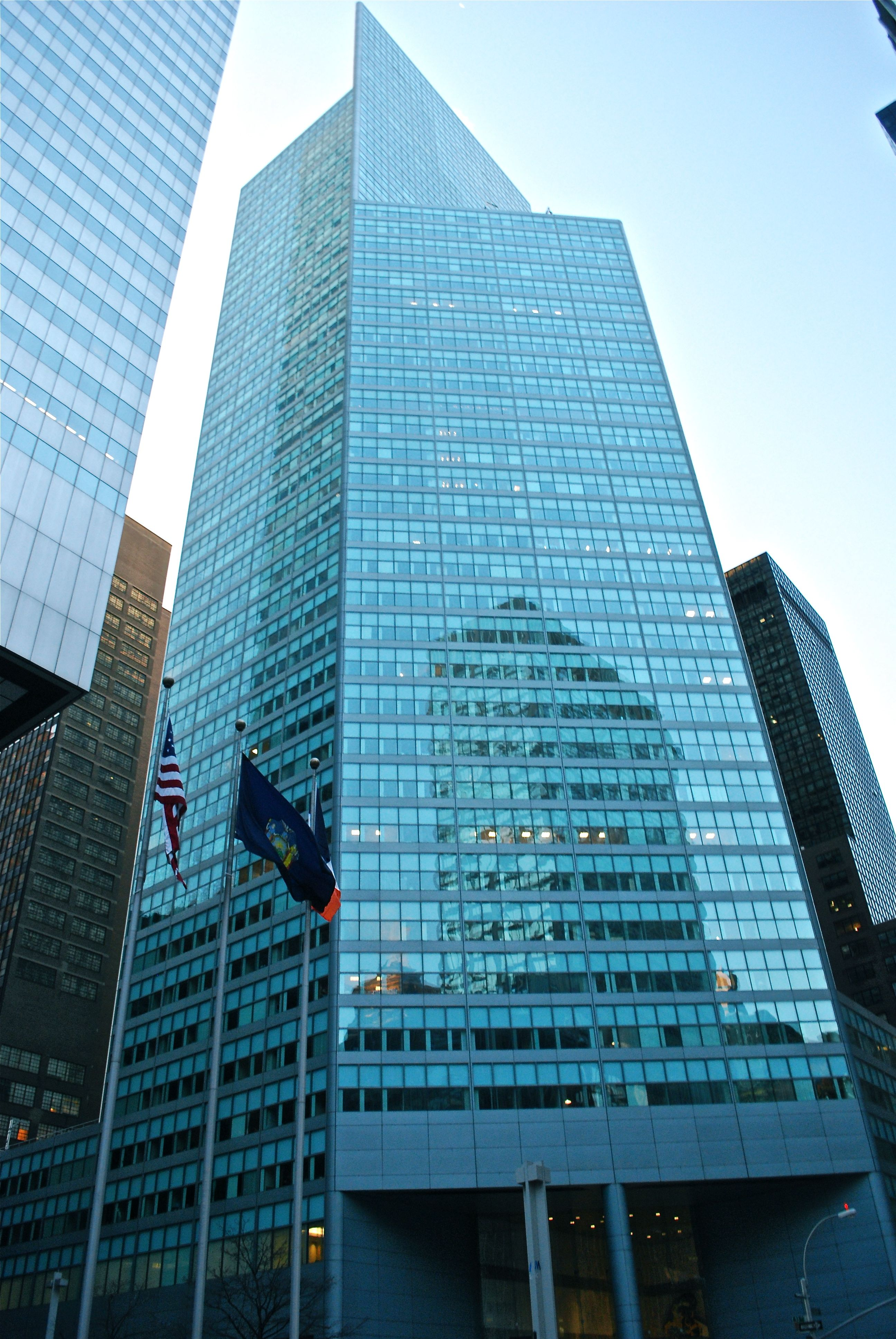
New York City office at 599 Lexington Avenue

== Notable clients and cases ==
- CVS Health in its $69 billion acquisition of health insurance company Aetna
- Electronic Arts in connection with a $1 billion investment grade senior notes public offering
- WebMD in its $2.8 billion sale to Internet Brands, a portfolio company of KKR
- Salesforce in its $2.8 billion acquisition of cloud-based e-commerce platform Demandware
- The Republic of Lithuania as Respondent in an ICSID arbitration brought by Veolia
- Dow Chemical Company in its $4.6 billion split off of the Dow Chlorine Products Business and the related debt-for-debt exchange
- Credit Suisse in class action lawsuits alleging price fixing of the "spreads" for initial public offerings
- General Electric in its $32 billion acquisition of Baker Hughes and combination with GE Oil & Gas to form a new publicly traded company
- JPMorgan Chase as lead arranger for €5.45 billion financings for Pirelli
- Qatar Investment Authority in its investment in Manhattan West, a development site valued upon completion at up to $8.6 billion
- Sony, as part of a consortium, in the $4.5 billion acquisition of Nortel's patents portfolio
- Boston Scientific in the $1.5 billion sale of its Neurovascular Business to Stryker Corporation
- Bank of America in connection with a $3.1 billion sale and repurchase agreement financing transaction related to Amgen's $10.5 billion purchase of Onyx Pharmaceuticals
- John Deere on the restructuring of its foreign operations
- David Karp, the founder and CEO of Tumblr, with his employment, retention and tax arrangements in Tumblr's $1.1 billion sale to Yahoo!
- Synthes in its $21.3 billion acquisition by Johnson & Johnson

== Controversies ==
Among Shearman & Sterling's East Asian clients was the Malaysian sovereign wealth fund 1MDB, which (under the control of Jho Low) had wired $368 million from a Swiss bank to the firm's trust account to pay for, among other things, a Beverly Hills hotel, private plane and yacht rentals, and the production of the film The Wolf of Wall Street. Shearman & Sterling was named in a series of civil complaints filed by the DOJ "for having provided a trust account through which hundreds of millions of dollars belonging to Malaysia's 1MDB fund were illicitly siphoned." However, the report added that neither Shearman nor any of its lawyers are accused of wrongdoing.

== Recognition ==
Shearman & Sterling attained recognition in a number of legal publications and industry rankings for its work in the United States and internationally across a range of practice areas, including dispute resolution/litigation, international arbitration, project finance, public international law, capital markets, and mergers and acquisitions.

== Pro bono ==
Shearman & Sterling had an active pro bono practice. Globally, the firm was pro bono counsel to the International Criminal Tribunal for Rwanda (ICTR) in Arusha, Tanzania. Shearman routinely assisted the ICTR through seconding one lawyer there per month to work on particular projects. The firm also assisted FINCA International, the pioneering microcredit and village banking non-profit organization. Other pro bono initiatives include asylum cases, Violence Against Women Act petitions, criminal appeals and art law representations.

== Notable alumni ==
=== Business ===
- Markus U. Diethelm, former international associate (1989–1992), and current general counsel of UBS AG.
- Philippe Dauman, former associate (1978–1987) and partner (1987–1993), and former CEO of Viacom.
- Mitch Caplan, former associate (1984–1990) and former CEO of E-Trade.
- Dr. Ann Olivarius, former Head of Corporate Practice, Washington, DC (1991-1992), and now Chair of the Executive Committee, McAllister Olivarius.
- Bob Woodruff, former associate and ABC News journalist.
- Nina Zagat, co-founder and co-chair of the Zagat Survey, was associated with the firm from 1966-1990.
- Tim Bezbatchenko, current general manager of Toronto FC of Major League Soccer.

=== Government ===
- Melody Barnes, former associate and former senior domestic policy adviser to former President Barack Obama.
- Laurens Jan Brinkhorst, Dutch politician, minister and member of the European Parliament.
- Raymond J. Dearie, former associate (1969–1971), Judge of the United States District Court for the Eastern District of New York.
- James Donato, former partner (2009–2014), Judge of the United States District Court for the Northern District of California.
- Joseph A. Doyle, former associate (1947–1956) and partner (1956–1979), Assistant Secretary of the Navy (Manpower and Reserve Affairs) in the Carter Administration.
- William Francis Kuntz, former associate (1978–1986), Judge of the United States District Court for the Eastern District of New York.
- John McCarthy, former associate (1966–1967), and former Australian ambassador to various countries including Vietnam, Mexico, the United States and Japan.
- Jeffrey A. Meyer, former associate, Judge of the United States District Court for the District of Connecticut.
- Caroline Mulroney, former associate and former Attorney General of Ontario.
- Clark T. Randt, Jr., formerly Shearman & Sterling's China Managing Partner, served as U.S. Ambassador to China from 2001-2009.

=== Academia ===
- Charles ("Chuck") W. Mooney Jr., the Charles A. Heimbold, Jr. Professor of Law, and former interim Dean, at the University of Pennsylvania Law School
- Robert Mundheim (born 1933), attorney, law professor, and Dean of the University of Pennsylvania Law School

== See also ==
- White shoe firms
- List of largest United States-based law firms by profits per partner
