= Tragwein =

- Municipality
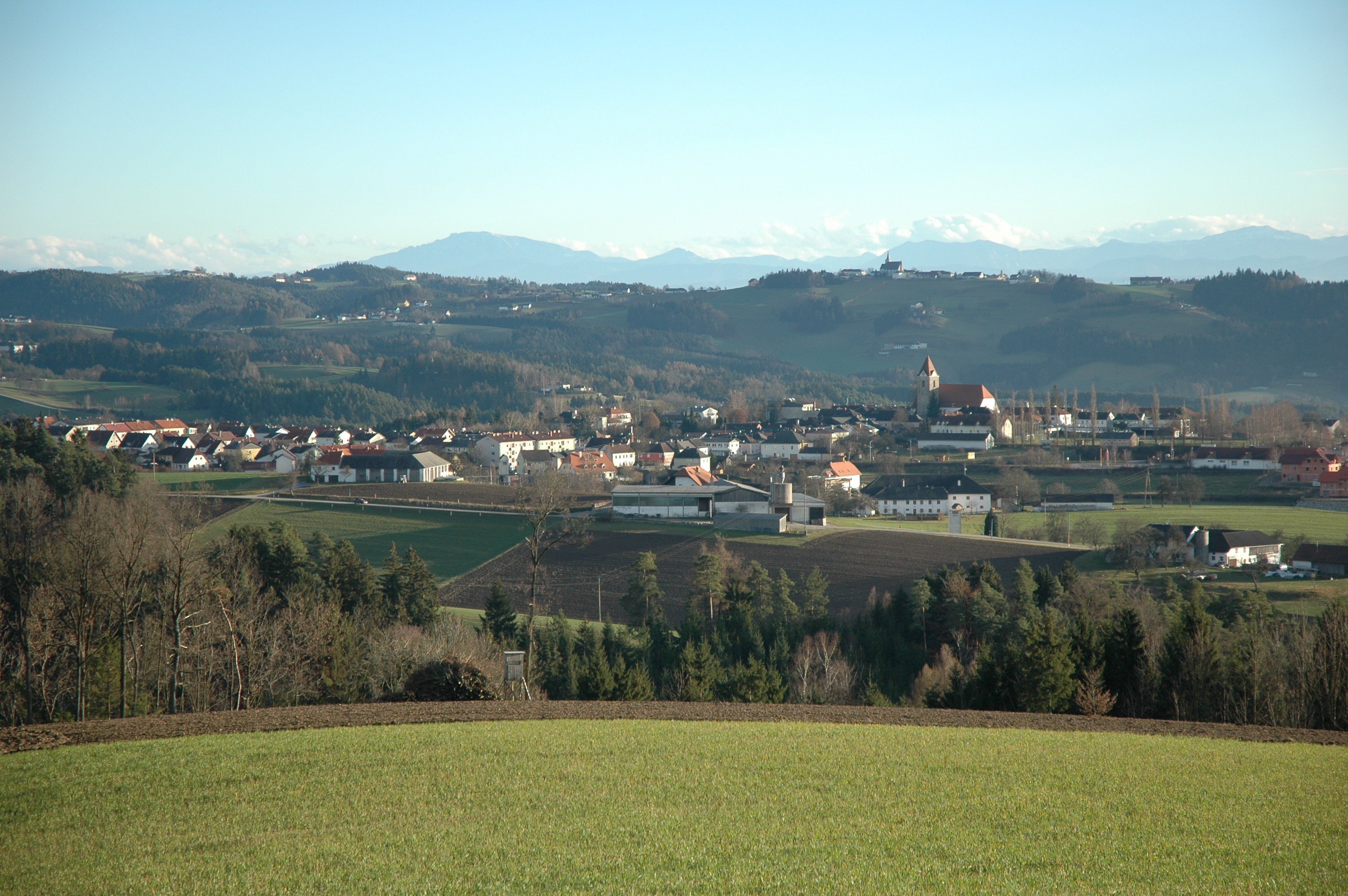
- View of Tragwein

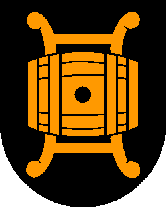
- Coat of arms

- Location within Austria
- Coordinates: 48°19′50″N 14°37′20″E
- Country: Austria
- State: Upper Austria
- District: Freistadt

Government
  - Mayor: Josef Naderer (ÖVP)

Area
  - Total: 39.48 km^{2} (15.24 sq mi)
- Elevation: 491 m (1,611 ft)

Population (2018-01-01)
  - Total: 3,082
  - Density: 78.06/km^{2} (202.2/sq mi)
- Time zone: UTC+1 (CET)
  - Summer (DST): UTC+2 (CEST)
- Postal code: 4284
- Area code: 07263
- Vehicle registration: FR
- Website: www.tragwein.at

Tragwein is a municipality in the district of Freistadt in the Austrian state of Upper Austria.

== Population ==
Historical population
Year	Pop.	±%
1869	2,178	—
1880	2,418	+11.0%
1890	2,514	+4.0%
1900	2,557	+1.7%
1910	2,599	+1.6%
1923	2,438	−6.2%
1934	2,525	+3.6%
1939	2,549	+1.0%
1951	2,479	−2.7%
1961	2,649	+6.9%
1971	2,768	+4.5%
1981	2,764	−0.1%
1991	2,854	+3.3%
2001	2,971	+4.1%
