= Christoph Beat Graber =

Swiss academic

Christoph Beat Graber (*1960) is a Swiss legal scholar and professor of legal sociology with particular focus on media law at the University of Zurich since 2015. He was previously a founding member of the Faculty of Law at the University of Lucerne and a consultant to various Swiss federal offices and the OECD on communication, cultural and copyright law issues.

== Life ==
His parents' work as hoteliers brought Christoph Beat Graber to St. Moritz in his childhood. After completing the Swiss Matura at the Lyceum Alpinum in the neighboring Zuoz, he studied law at the Universities of Bern and St. Gallen and was admitted to the bar in 1989.

Thanks to research grants from the Swiss National Science Foundation and the Swiss Federal Department of Home Affairs, Graber subsequently completed his doctoral studies at the European University Institute (EUI) in Florence, where he was able to work closely with Gunther Teubner, among others, and thus further deepen his understanding of Niklas Luhmann's systems theory. He defended his doctoral thesis about the interferences of art and economy from a legal perspective in 1993 as a PhD, before it was published by the Nomos Publishing House in 1994.

Back at the University of Bern, Christoph Beat Graber habilitated in 2002 on the topic of trade and culture in the audiovisual law of the World Trade Organization. The habilitation thesis, published by Stämpfli, examines the field of tension between international law, economics and cultural policy from an interdisciplinary point of view - a method typically characterizing Graber's work.

== Career ==
After working as a senior research and teaching assistant and lecturer at the University of Bern, Graber became a full professor at the Faculty of Law of the University of Lucerne as a founding member. Between 2001 and 2014, he taught communication and cultural law, international law and legal sociology.

In 2010, he was awarded the Swiss-Academies Award for Transdisciplinary Research, the most highly endowed prize of the Swiss Academies of Arts and Sciences.

He was called to the University of Zurich in 2015, where he was appointed full professor at the newly created Chair for Legal Sociology with particular focus on Media Law. He gives various lectures on the foundations of legal sociology, the law of art and culture, and the normative effects of new and emerging technologies on the Internet, his current research focus. Graber is also a member of the executive committee of the Executive Master in Art Market Studies at the University of Zurich.

In the context of his interdisciplinary and international research, Christoph Beat Graber has been a Visiting Professor and Scholar at Georgetown University Law Center, at the Institute of International Economic Law of the University of Wollongong and at the Center for the Study of Law at the University of California, Berkeley. From 2016 to 2021, he was a Faculty Associate at the Berkman Klein Center for Internet and Society at Harvard University.

In 2023, he returned to Florence as a Fernand Braudel Senior Fellow at the European University Institute. As part of the award, he will participate in the research project "Towards an Institutionalization of Net Neutrality as a Fundamental Right? Prospects of Societal Constitutionalism in the Digital Society".

In addition to his academic activities, he has held positions as a consultant to Swiss federal offices and the OECD and as the Executive Director of the Independent Complaints Authority for Radio and Television (UBI). For the duration of two election periods, Graber served as an (independent) member of the Federal Arbitration Commission for the utilization of Copyrights and Related Rights (EschK), elected by the Swiss Federal Council. Furthermore, he is and has been entrusted with various board and foundation mandates, such as that of the Solothurn Film Festival or the Centro Giacometti.

== Selected works ==
Graber is the author of a large variety of writings, including monographs, editorships, commentaries, academic papers as well as newspaper articles.

- How the Law Learns in the Digital Society, in: Law, Technology and Humans, Vol. 3, No. 2, 2021, 12-27, https://doi.org/10.5204/lthj.1600.
- Geplant war ein Helfer, heraus kam ein Spion. Wie der Like-Button von Facebook neues Recht entstehen lässt, Neue Zürcher Zeitung vom 28. Juni 2021, S. 28.
- Die Zukunft der Medienverfassung, Mohr Siebeck, Tübingen 2021 (mit Karl-Heinz Ladeur, Albert Ingold und Dan Wielsch), doi:10.1628/978-3-16-160811-7
- Personalisierung im Internet, Autonomie der Politik und Service public, in: sic! - Zeitschrift für Immaterialgüter-, Informations- und Wettbewerbsrecht 5/2017, 257-270 (pre-published as i-call Working Paper No. 2017/02, Zurich, Switzerland: University of Zurich).
- Bottom-up Constitutionalism: the Case of Net Neutrality, in: Transnational Legal Theory, Vol. 7, No. 4, 2017, pp. 524–552, https://doi.org/10.1080/20414005.2017.1300678 (pre-published as i-call Working Paper No. 2017/01, Zurich, Switzerland: University of Zurich).
- Die Schweizerische Bundesverfassung (Kommentar), 3. erweiterte Auflage, Schulthess, Zurich, 2014, 1771-1783 (Hrsg. Bernhard Ehrenzeller).
- Intellectual Property: Law in Context, in: James D Wright (ed.), International Encyclopaedia of the Social and Behavioral Sciences, second edition, Oxford: Elsevier, 2015, pp. 266-272; online edition, [https://doi.org/10.1016/B978-0-08-097086-8.86038-9] (pre-published as i-call Working Paper No. 2014/01) (mit Jessica C. Lai).
- Trade and Culture, in: Rüdiger Wolfrum (ed.), The Max Planck Encyclopedia of Public International Law, Oxford: Oxford University Press, 2013, pp. 971-978; online edition, [www.mpepil.com].
- Governance of Digital Game Environments and Cultural Diversity. Transdisciplinary Enquiries. Edward Elgar, Cheltenham/UK, 2010 (mit Mira Burri-Nenova).
- Free trade versus cultural diversity. WTO negotiations in the field of audiovisual services. In Herausgeberschaft mit Michael Girsberger und Mira Nenova, Zürich 2004, ISBN 3-7255-4704-1
- Handel und Kultur im Audiovisionsrecht der WTO. Völkerrechtliche, ökonomische und kulturpolitische Grundlagen einer globalen Medienordnung. Bern 2003, ISBN 3-7272-9905-3
- Zwischen Geist und Geld. Interferenzen von Kunst und Wirtschaft aus rechtlicher Sicht. Interdisziplinäre und rechtsvergleichende Untersuchung unter besonderer Berücksichtigung des schweizerischen Rechts. Baden-Baden 1994, ISBN 3-7890-3283-2

== Links ==
- https://www.ius.uzh.ch/en/staff/professorships/alphabetical/graber/person.html
- https://www.emams.uzh.ch/en/about-us/advisoryboard.html
- https://cyber.harvard.edu/people/cgraber
