= Hermann Veit Graber =

Hermann Veit Graber (9 April 1873 – 17 May 1939) was an Austrian geologist. He specialized in petrology and worked on the granites and diorites of the Upper Austrian Mühlviertel region.

Graber was born in Graz, the son of the zoologist Veit Graber. He went to the local Gymnasium and later at the classical gymnasium of Suczawa. In 1891 he went to the University of Czernowitz to study natural sciences. He attended lectures in botany by Tangl, physics by Tumlirz and mineralogy from Scharitzer and zoology from his father. After the death of his father he went to study in Prague studying mineralogy from Becke, geology under Laube, botany under Wilkomm, Weiss and von Wettstein, physics under Ernst Mach among others. In 1896 he received a doctorate with a dissertation on the crystalline schists of Southern Carinthia.

He worked with the Imperial Geological Survey from 1896 to 1898 and then taught in middle schools in Linz (1901–7) and Jägerndorf (1913–18). During World War I he volunteered with the Landsturm and became lieutenant engineer receiving four medals including a golden cross of merit. When he returned to teach in Pula (Istria), he was rejected due to his German ancestry. He then taught in Klagenfurt, Graz (1919) and Vienna. In 1925 he worked with the geological survey of the Mühlviertel and the Passau Forest, studying the gneiss and granite tectonics of the region. He also collaborated with Hans Cloos. He retired in 1930.
