= Valentina Matviyenko =

Russian politician (born 1949)

Her Excellency Valentina Matviyenko
- Валентина Матвиенко
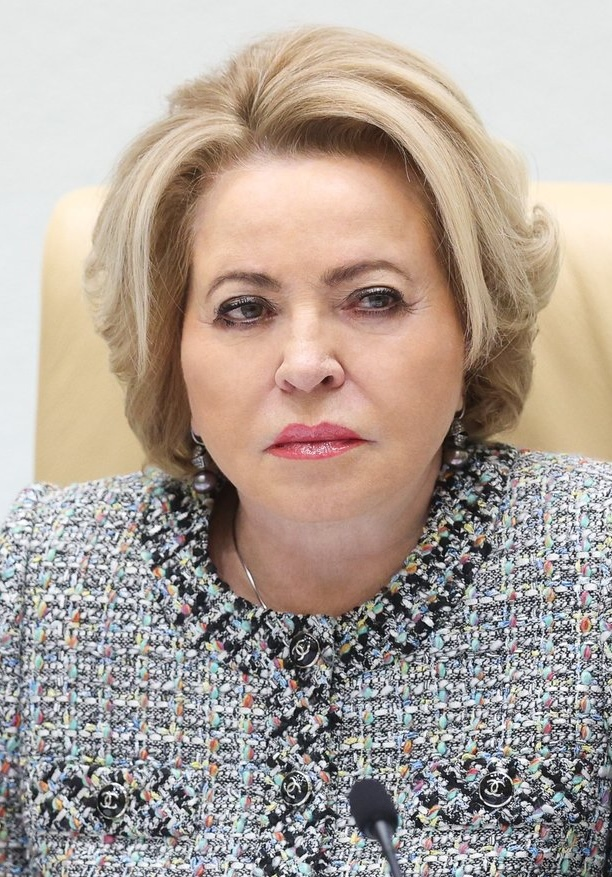
- Matviyenko in 2025

4th Chairwoman of the Federation Council
- Incumbent
- Assumed office 21 September 2011
- Preceded by: Alexander Torshin (acting); Sergei Mironov

Russian Federation Senator from Saint Petersburg
- Incumbent
- Assumed office 31 August 2011
- Preceded by: Vladimir Barkanov

3rd Governor of Saint Petersburg
- In office 15 October 2003 – 22 August 2011
- Preceded by: Alexander Beglov (acting); Vladimir Yakovlev
- Succeeded by: Georgy Poltavchenko

2nd Presidential Envoy to the Northwestern Federal District
- In office 11 March 2003 – 15 October 2003
- President: Vladimir Putin
- Preceded by: Victor Cherkesov
- Succeeded by: Ilya Klebanov

Deputy Prime Minister of Russia for Welfare
- In office 24 September 1998 – 11 March 2003
- Prime Minister: Yevgeny Primakov (1998–1999); Sergei Stepashin (1999); Vladimir Putin (1999–2000); Mikhail Kasyanov (2000–2003)
- Preceded by: Office established
- Succeeded by: Office abolished

Russian Ambassador to Greece (Hellenic Republic)
- In office 1997–1998
- President: Boris Yeltsin
- Preceded by: Valery Nikolayenko
- Succeeded by: Mikhail Bocharnikov

Russian Ambassador to the Republic of Malta
- In office 1991–1994
- President: Boris Yeltsin
- Preceded by: Vladimir Plechko
- Succeeded by: Yevgeny Mikhailov

Personal details
- Born: Valentina Ivanovna Tyutina; 7 April 1949 (age 77) Shepetivka, Kamianets-Podilskyi Oblast, Ukrainian SSR, Soviet Union (now Ukraine)
- Citizenship: Russian
- Party: United Russia
- Spouse: Vladimir Vasilyevich Matviyenko (died 2018)
- Children: Sergey Matviyenko (born 1973)
- Education: Leningrad Institute of Chemistry and Pharmaceutics
- Occupation: Politician; Diplomat
- Profession: Pharmacist
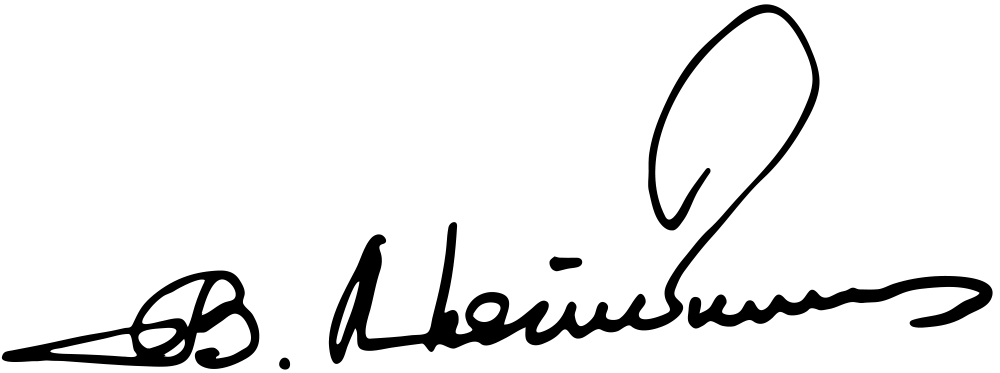
- Signature
- Valentina Matviyenko's voice From the Echo of Moscow program, recorded 29 October 2012

Valentina Ivanovna Matviyenko (Note: Russian: Валентина Ивановна Матвиенко, IPA: [vəlʲɪnʲˈtʲinə ɪˈvanəvnə mətvʲɪˈjenkə] Ukrainian: Валентина Іванівна Матвієнко, romanized: Valentyna Ivanivna Matviienko, IPA: [wɐlenˈtɪnɐ iˈwɑn⁽ʲ⁾iu̯nɐ mɐt⁽ʲ⁾wiˈjɛnko].) (née Tyutina; (Note: Russian: Тютина, IPA: [ˈtʲʉtʲɪnə] Ukrainian: Тютіна, romanized: Tiutina, IPA: [ˈtʲut⁽ʲ⁾inɐ].) born 7 April 1949) is a Russian politician and former diplomat serving as a Senator from Saint Petersburg and the Chairwoman of the Federation Council since 2011. Previously she was Governor of Saint Petersburg from 2003 to 2011.

Born in the Ukrainian SSR, Matviyenko began her political career in the 1980s in Leningrad (now Saint Petersburg), and was the First Secretary of the Krasnogvardeysky District Communist Party of the city from 1984 to 1986. In the 1990s, Matviyenko served as the Russian ambassador to Malta (1991–1995), and to Greece (1997–1998). From 1998 to 2003, Matviyenko was Deputy Prime Minister for Welfare, and briefly the Presidential Envoy to the Northwestern Federal District in 2003. By that time, Matviyenko was firmly allied with Russian president Vladimir Putin, an alliance which secured her a victory in the gubernatorial elections in Saint Petersburg, Putin's native city.

Matviyenko became the first female leader of Saint Petersburg. Since the start of Matviyenko's service as governor, a significant share of taxation money was transferred from the federal budget to the local budget, and along with the booming economy and improving investment climate the standard of living significantly increased in the city, making income levels much closer to Moscow, and far above most other Russian federal subjects. The profile of Saint Petersburg in Russian politics has risen, marked by the transfer of the Constitutional Court of Russia from Moscow in 2008. Matviyenko developed a large number of megaprojects in housing and infrastructure, such as the construction of the Saint Petersburg Ring Road, including the Big Obukhovsky Bridge (the only non-draw bridge over the Neva River in the city), completion of the Saint Petersburg Dam aimed to put an end to the infamous Saint Petersburg floods, launching Line 5 of Saint Petersburg Metro, and starting land reclamation in the Neva Bay for the new Marine Facade of the city (the largest European waterfront development project) containing the Passenger Port of St. Petersburg. Several major auto-producing companies were drawn to Saint Petersburg or its vicinity, including Toyota, General Motors, Nissan, Hyundai Motor, Suzuki, Magna International, Scania, and MAN SE (all having plants in the Shushary industrial zone), thus turning the city into an important center of automotive industry in Russia, specializing in foreign brands. Another development of Matviyenko's governorship was tourism; by 2010 the number of tourists in Saint Petersburg doubled and reached 5.2 million, which placed the city among the top five tourist centers in Europe.

Some actions and practices of Governor Matviyenko have drawn significant criticisms from the Saint Petersburg public, the media, and opposition groups. In particular, new construction in already heavily built-up areas and several building projects were deemed to conflict with the classical architecture of the city, where the entire centre is a UNESCO World Heritage Site. Some projects eventually were cancelled or modified, such as the controversial design of a 400-metre-tall Okhta Center skyscraper, planned to be built adjacent to the historical center of the city; however, after a public campaign and the personal involvement of Russian president Dmitry Medvedev, it was relocated from Okhta to the Lakhta suburb. Another major point of criticism was Matviyenko's handling of the city's snow removal problems during the unusually cold and snowy winters of 2009–10 and 2010–11. On 22 August 2011, soon after completion of the Saint Petersburg Dam, Matviyenko resigned from office. As a member of the ruling United Russia Party, on 21 September 2011, Matviyenko was elected as Chairwoman of the Federation Council, the country's third-highest elected office.

== Early life ==
Valentina Tyutina was born in Shepetivka in the Khmelnytskyi Oblast of Western Ukrainian SSR, Soviet Union. In 1972, Matviyenko graduated from Leningrad Institute of Chemistry and Pharmaceutics, where she met her husband, Vladimir Vasilyevich Matviyenko. They had a son, Sergey, in 1973. Matviyenko held various leadership positions within the Komsomol organization until 1984.

== Early political career ==
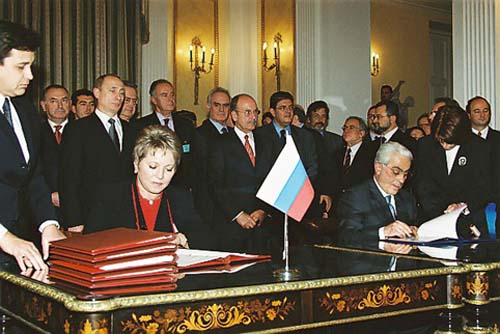
Deputy Prime Minister Valentina Matviyenko signs joint documents in Greece on behalf of the Russian Federation while accompanying President Vladimir Putin.

Valentina Matviyenko graduated from the Communist Party of the Soviet Union's Academy in 1985 and became a party official in Leningrad's municipal government. In 1984–1986, she was the First Secretary of the Krasnogvardeysky District Committee of the Party. Matviyenko was elected as a people's deputy to the Supreme Soviet of the Soviet Union and headed the committee on women, family and children affairs.

Between 1991 and 1998, Matviyenko served in the diplomatic service and held diplomatic positions including posts of Russian ambassador to Malta (1991–1995) and to Greece (1997–1998). On 24 September 1998, Matviyenko was appointed Deputy Prime Minister of Russia for Welfare, and occupied this position until 2003. In June 1999 she worked on the board of directors of the ORT TV channel.

On 3 February 2000, she was nominated for the presidency, but refused to contest. On 29 February 2000, she announced that she was considering running in the St. Petersburg governor elections to be held on 14 May, and on 10 March announced that she was indeed launching her campaign. However, on 4 April she claimed that Vladimir Putin had asked her to withdraw from the elections, and she did so on 5 April. On 11 March 2003, she left the Deputy PM position and was appointed presidential envoy to the Northwestern Federal District by Vladimir Putin.

== Governor of Saint Petersburg ==
=== Election ===
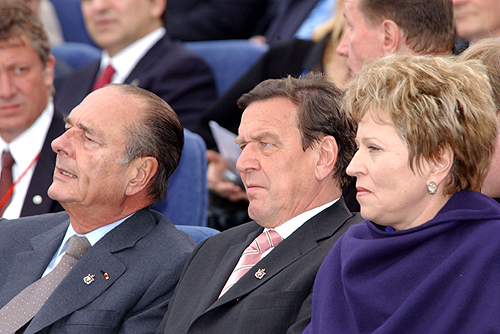
French president Jacques Chirac, Chancellor of Germany Gerhard Schroeder and Valentina Matviyenko during the celebration of the 300th anniversary of Saint Petersburg in 2003.

On 24 June 2003, after Saint Petersburg governor Vladimir Yakovlev resigned ahead of schedule, Matviyenko announced that she was ready to run for governor. Her nomination was supported by the United Russia political party and President Vladimir Putin. Putin publicly supported her candidacy on 2 September in a meeting that was broadcast by two state-owned TV stations. Previously, at the end of June, the new management of local channel St. Petersburg Television shut down a range of analytical programmes on local politics, which was thought to be one of the factors in elections outcome.

In the first round of elections held on 21 September 2003, Matviyenko came first with 48.61% of the vote, followed by Anna Markova, a former member of Yakovlev's staff, with 15.89%. 10.97 percent of the electorate voted against all nine nominees. Turnout was low at just 29%. On 5 October 2003, Matviyenko won the second round with 63 percent (vs. 24% for Anna Markova) and was elected governor of Saint Petersburg, the head of the Saint Petersburg City Administration. She became the first female head of government of Saint Petersburg.

=== Confirmation in office ===
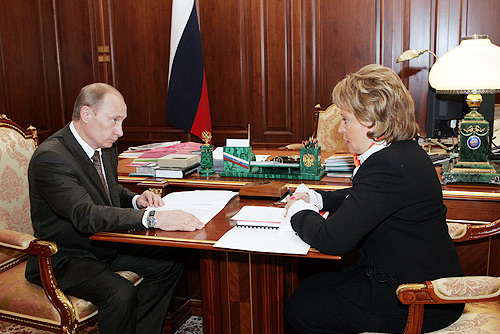
Vladimir Putin and Valentina Matviyenko in 2008.

In 2005, a new Russian federal law came into force whereby governors are proposed by the president of Russia and approved or disapproved by regional legislative assemblies rather than elected by direct popular vote. On 6 December 2006, one year before her term as elected governor would expire, Valentina Matviyenko asked Vladimir Putin to nominate her for approval according to the new legislation, and he agreed. She was approved by the Saint Petersburg Legislative Assembly on 22 December 2006.

=== Public protests ===
On 3 March 2007, scores of participants of the Dissenters' March, organized by marginal opposition parties, demonstrated in the city's main avenue, Nevsky Prospekt, calling for governor Matviyenko's dismissal. She in turn accused them of stirring up trouble ahead of elections to the Saint Petersburg Legislative Assembly scheduled for 11 March, of criticising the city's perceived dynamic development and for allegedly receiving financial support from dubious sources. On 15 April 2007, the Dissenters' March took place in Saint Petersburg for the second time.

=== Assassination attempt ===
On 19 May 2007, the Federal Security Service of the Russian Federation announced it had detained several members of an undisclosed youth religious group on 16 May who were alleged to be preparing an assassination attempt on Valentina Matviyenko's life using hand grenades and plastic explosive.

=== City development ===
==== Budget and incomes ====
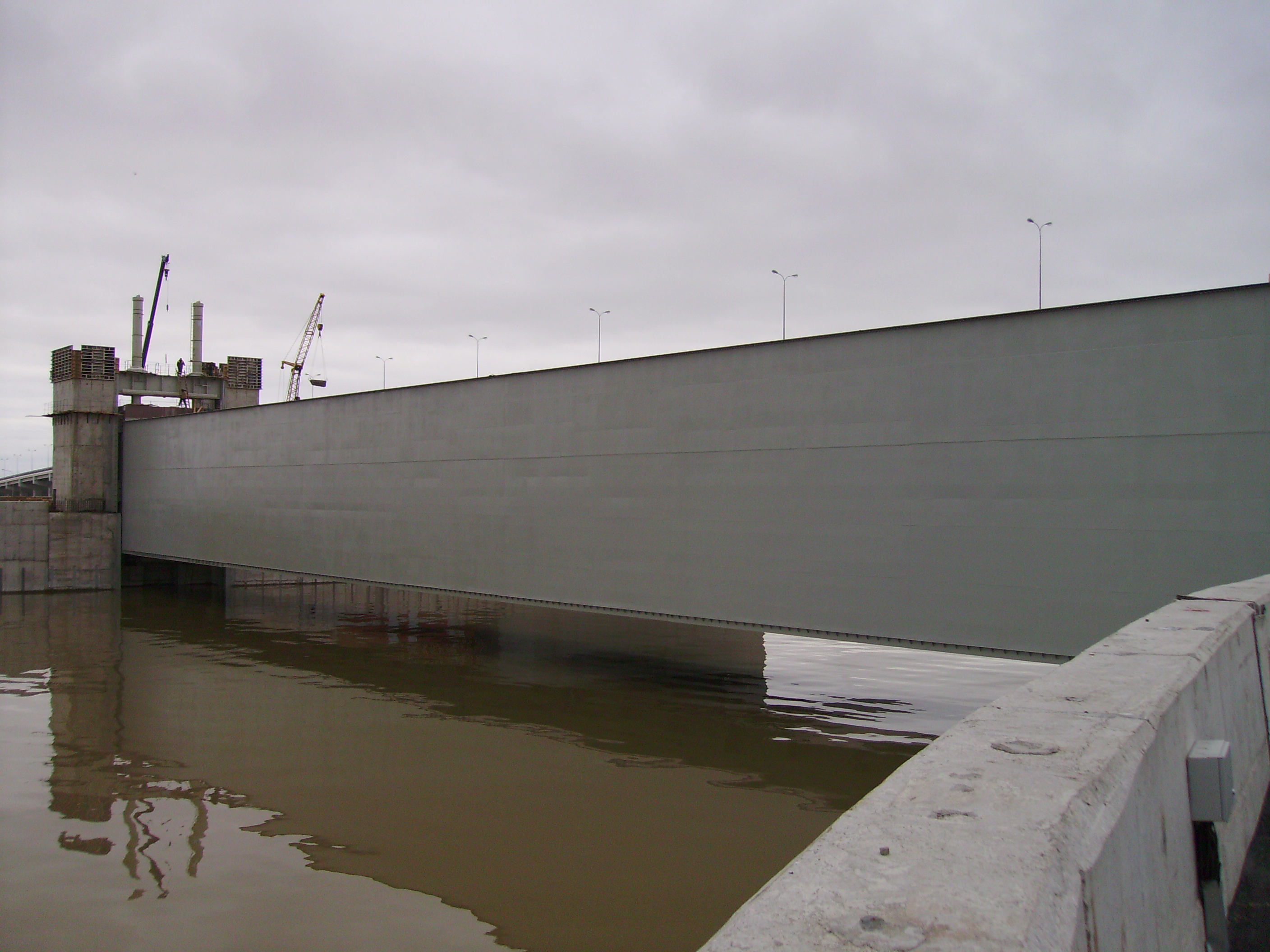
The Saint Petersburg Dam was completed when Matviyenko was in office. The dam is the last part of the Saint Petersburg Ring Road, with the longest sub-sea tunnel in Russia going below the dam's largest lock.

Matviyenko electoral promises included the transfer of a significant share of taxation money from the federal budget to the local one, which was supported by President Putin, a native of Saint Petersburg.

==== Political profile ====
New governor pledged her support for the idea of transferring some part of the capital's functions from Moscow to Saint Petersburg. The role of Saint Petersburg in Russian politics has risen, marked by the transfer of the Constitutional Court of Russia from Moscow in 2008. The city's main television broadcast, Petersburg – Channel 5, in October 2006 was licensed to broadcast nationwide again.

==== Infrastructure ====
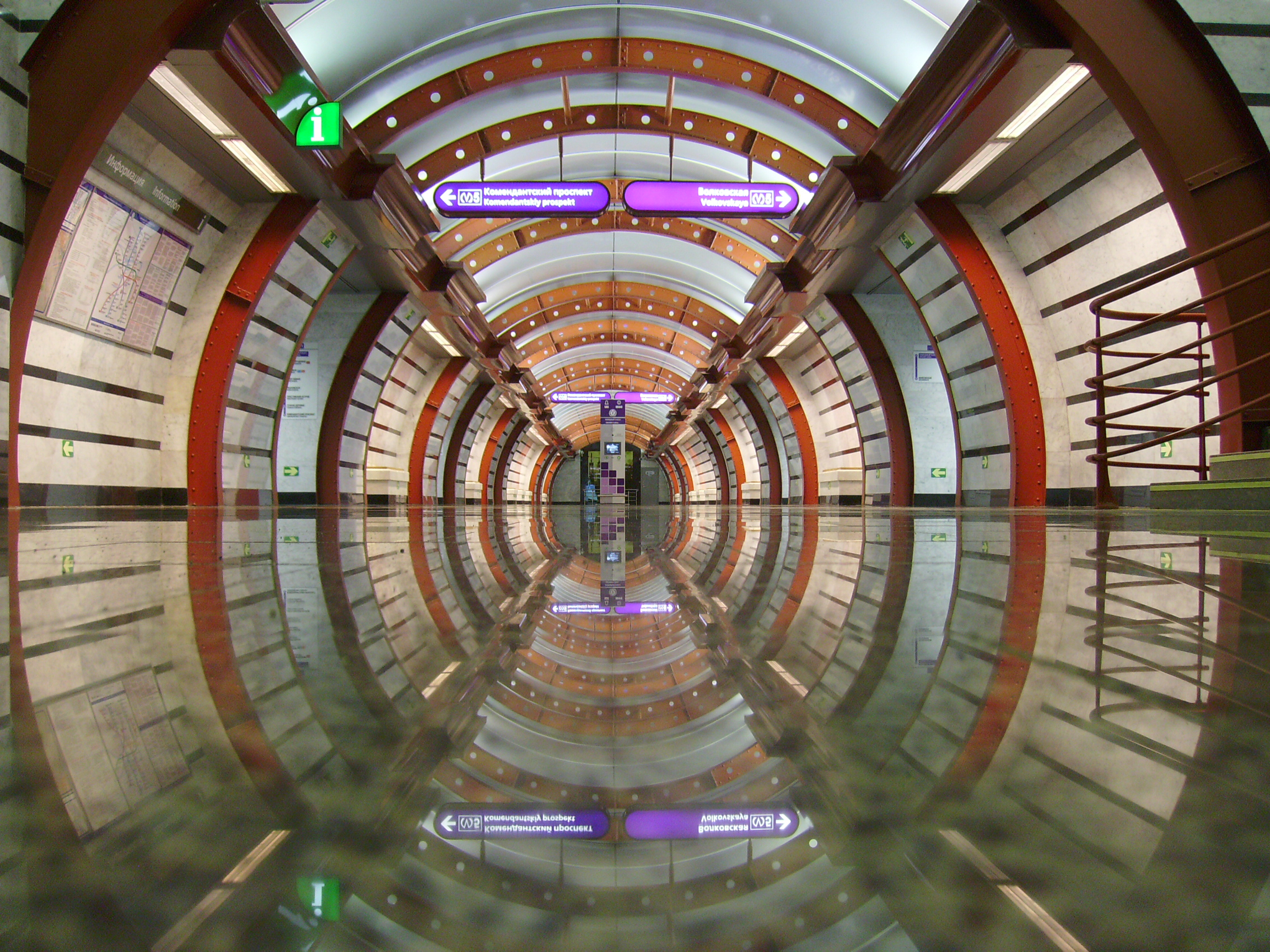
The construction of the Saint Petersburg Metro gained pace under Matviyenko. (Obvodny Kanal, the newest station, is shown).

Matviyenko developed a large number of megaprojects in housing and infrastructure, such as building of the Saint Petersburg Ring Road including the Big Obukhovsky Bridge (the only non-draw bridge over the Neva River in the city), completion of the Saint Petersburg Dam aimed to put an end to the infamous Saint Petersburg floods, launching Line 5 of Saint Petersburg Metro.

==== Industry ====
Several major auto-producing companies were drawn to Saint Petersburg or its vicinity, including Toyota, General Motors, Nissan, Hyundai Motor, Suzuki, Magna International, Scania and MAN SE (all having plants in Shushary industrial zone).

==== Tourism ====
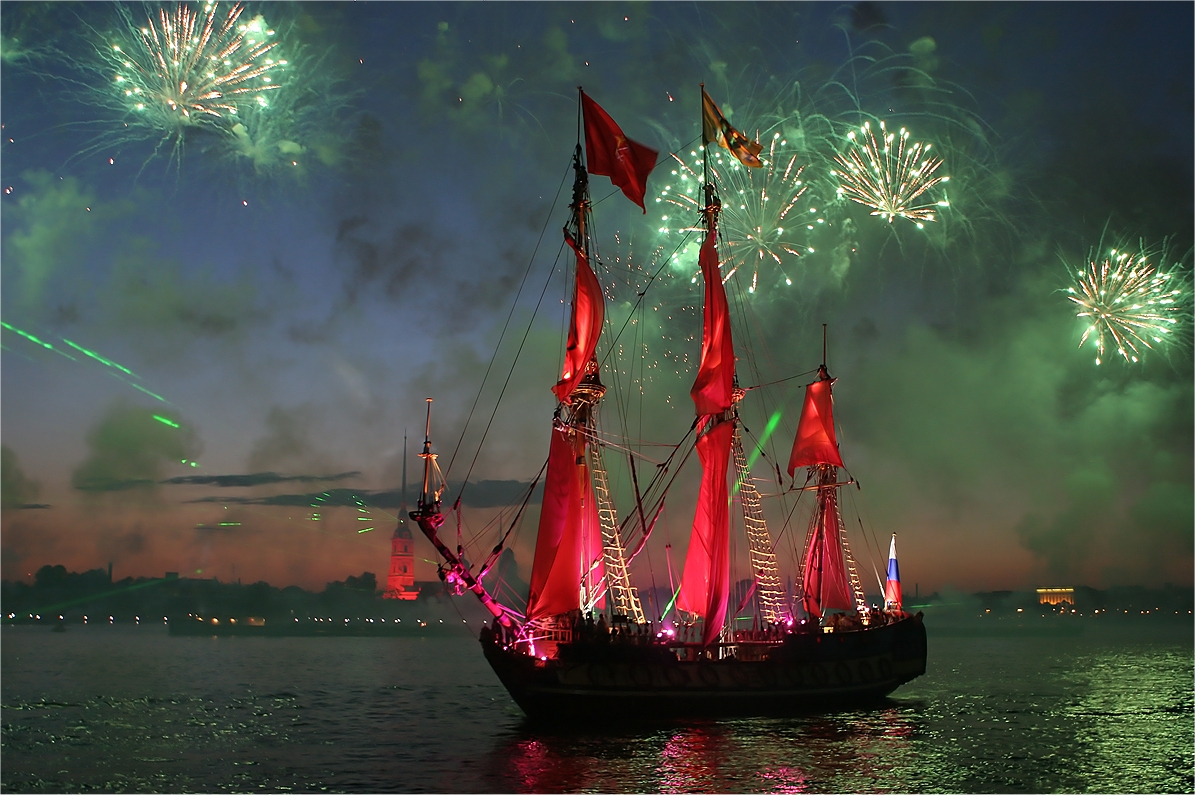
The celebration of the graduation from school, the Scarlet Sails, rose to a new scale under Matviyenko and began to be broadcast nationwide.

The city administration launched a number of programs aimed to increase the number of tourist arrivals (such as advertisement campaigns abroad) and to improve the tourist infrastructure in the city, including the construction of new hotels. Between 2003 and 2010, the number of tourists in Saint Petersburg doubled and reached 5.2 million, which placed the city among the top 5 tourist centers in Europe.

==== Culture ====
The June celebration of the graduation from school, the Scarlet Sails (a part of the White Nights Festival), rose to a new scale under Matviyenko.

=== Criticism ===
==== Controversial construction projects ====
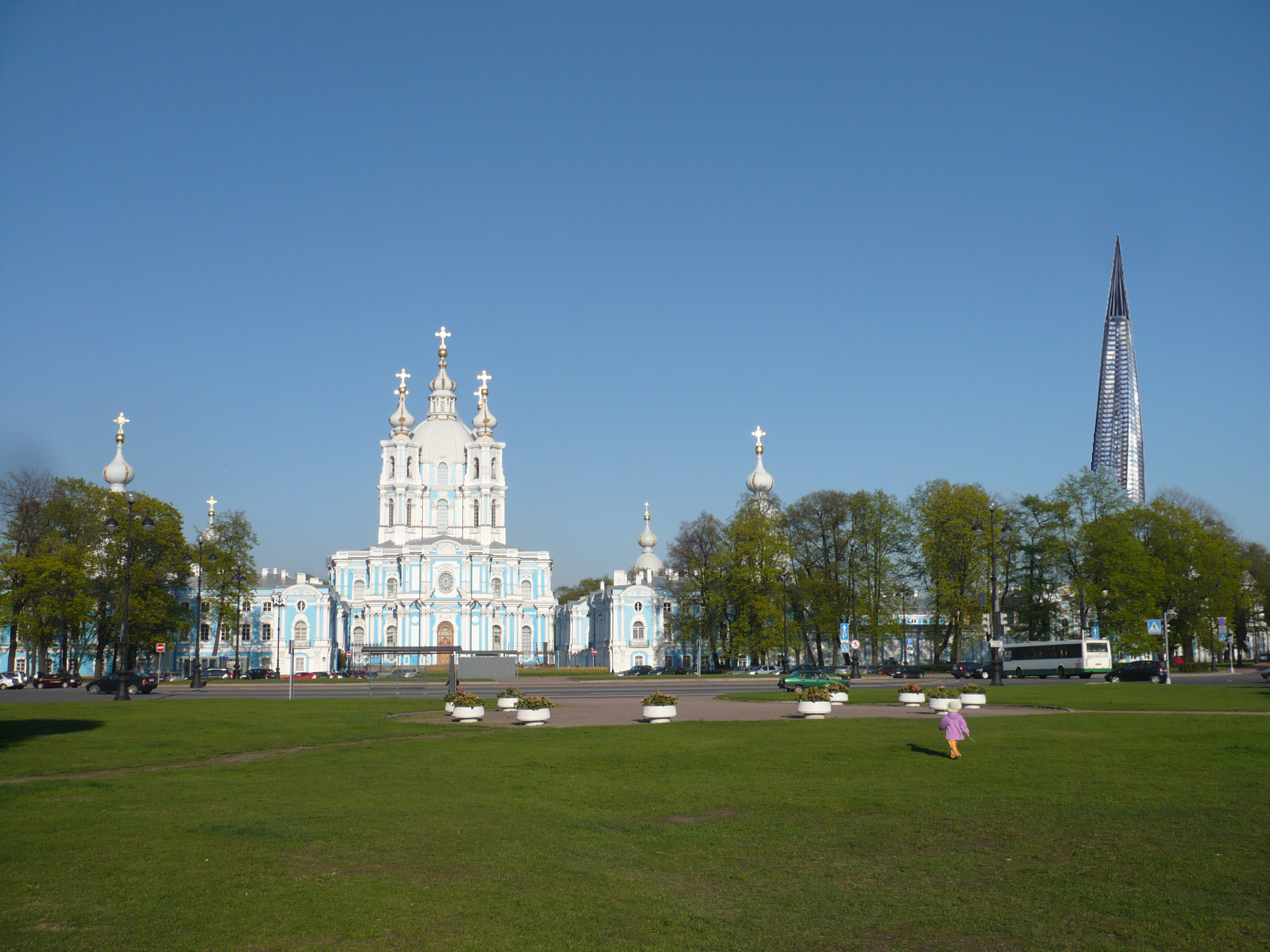
A collage showing how the controversial Okhta Center skyscraper would look beside the historic Smolny Cathedral by Bartolomeo Rastrelli.

The new construction in already heavily built-up areas was a point of continuous criticism during Matviyenko's governorship. Of especial note were a number of building projects deemed by many experts and conservative public to contradict the classical architecture of the city where the entire centre is UNESCO World Heritage Site.

Matviyenko supported the construction project of the Gazprom City business center (also called Okhta Center) including a 400-meter skyscraper holding the headquarters of some of Gazprom's subsidiaries on the right bank of the Neva River in the vicinity of the historic Smolny Cathedral. The current regulations forbidding construction buildings of more than 42 meters (48 with expert approval) were specially changed by the city administration for the project.

By the end of her governor service, Matviyenko more eagerly engaged in dialogue with the groups of the so-called gradozaschitniki (градозащитники, "city-defenders"). A number of controversial projects eventually were cancelled or modified. Notably, after an extensive public protest campaign, which lasted several years, and after the personal involvement of Russian president Dmitry Medvedev, the Okhta Center was relocated from Okhta to Lakhta suburb.

Other controversial projects include the Mariinsky Theatre Second Stage and the reconstruction of the New Holland Island. Both projects required destruction of some of the earlier historic buildings, and the new stage of the Mariinsky Theatre was originally attempted to be built according to a highly original design by French architect Dominique Perrault, resembling a cocoon. The project, however, was deemed too costly and too much out-of-line with the surrounding classical architecture, and the design was changed.

==== Snow cleaning problems ====
Matviyenko's handling of the cleaning of the city from snow during the unusually cold and snowy winters of 2009–2010 and 2010–2011, in the last two years of her governorship, drew criticism, especially from the automobile owners and drivers in the city. The authorities were unprepared for vast amounts of snow on the city streets, especially in the historical centre, and there was a lack of snow cleaning equipment.

==== Accusations of corporate raiding ====
Businessman Vitaly Arkhangelsky accused Matviyenko of corporate raiding and corruption. According to him, Matviyenko is the real owner of the Bank Saint Petersburg that staged a corporate raid on the property of his company, OMG that included Vyborg Port and Western Terminal of Saint Petersburg port using falsified documents with Arkhangelsky's forged signature. The lawyers of Bank Saint Petersburg insist on exclusion materials of Matviyenko's involvement from the criminal case in London court.

== Chairwoman of the Federation Council ==
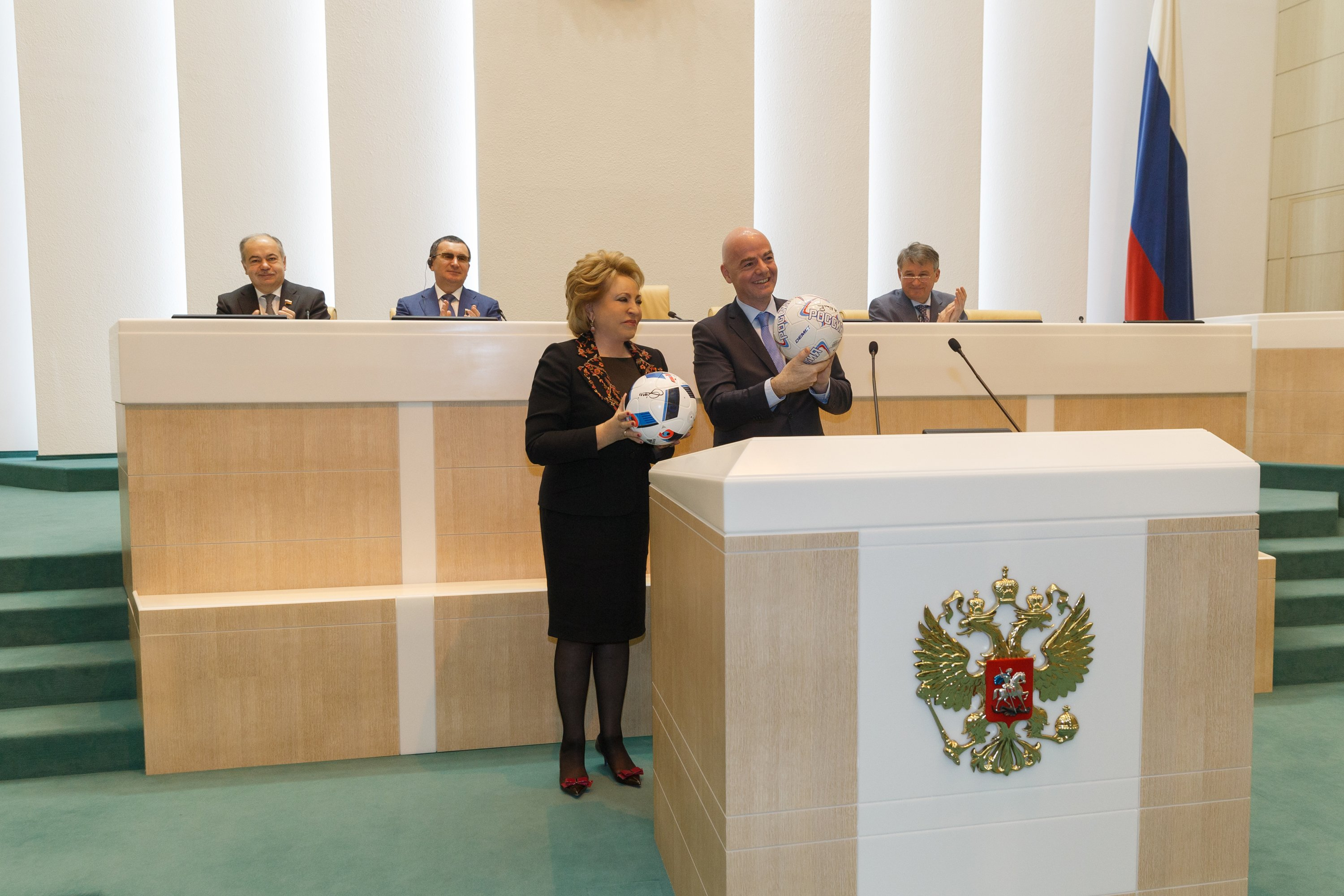
Matviyenko with FIFA President Gianni Infantino during his visit to the Federation Council on 20 April 2016

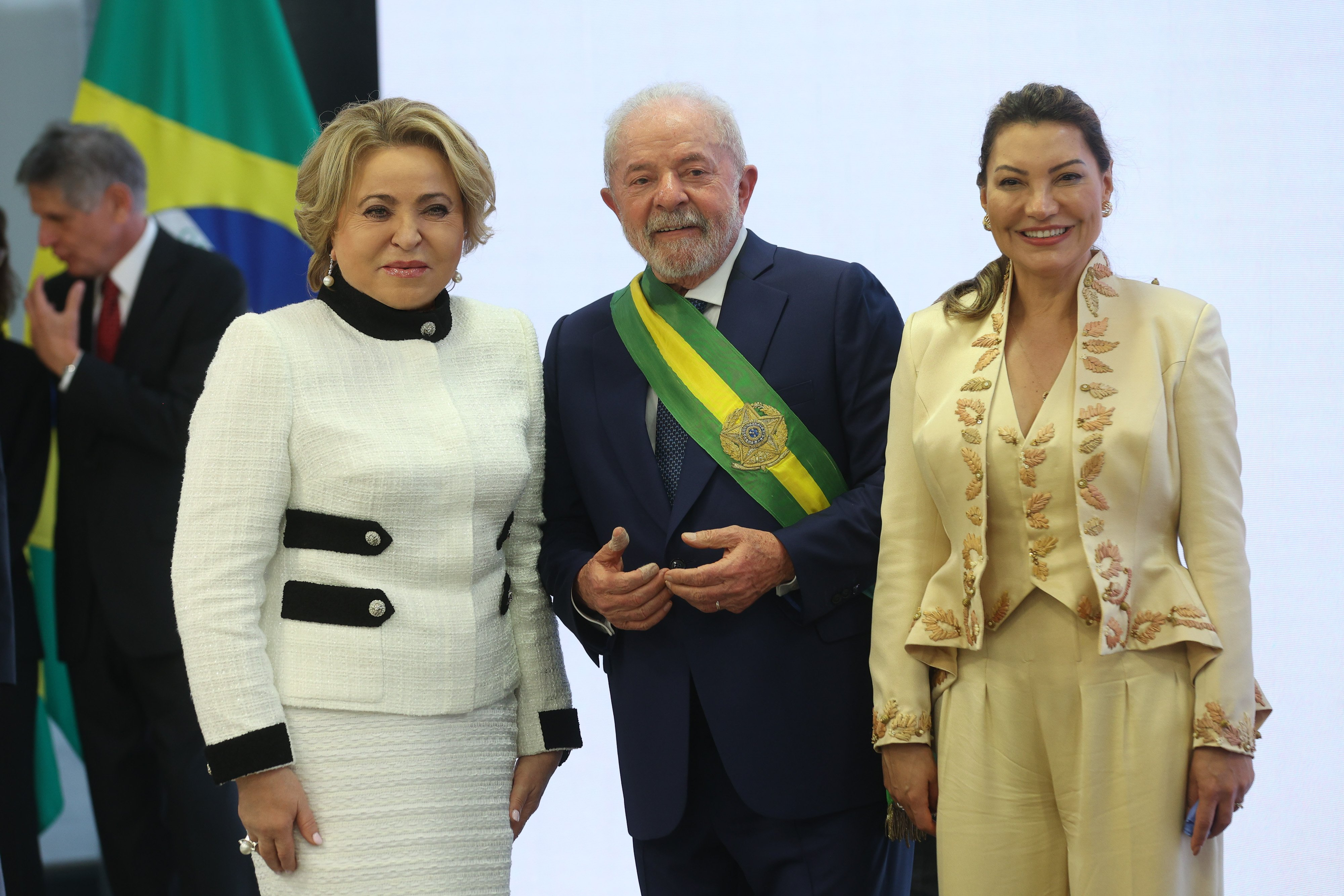
Matviyenko arrived in Brazil to attend the inauguration of the country's elected President Luiz Inácio Lula da Silva in January 2023

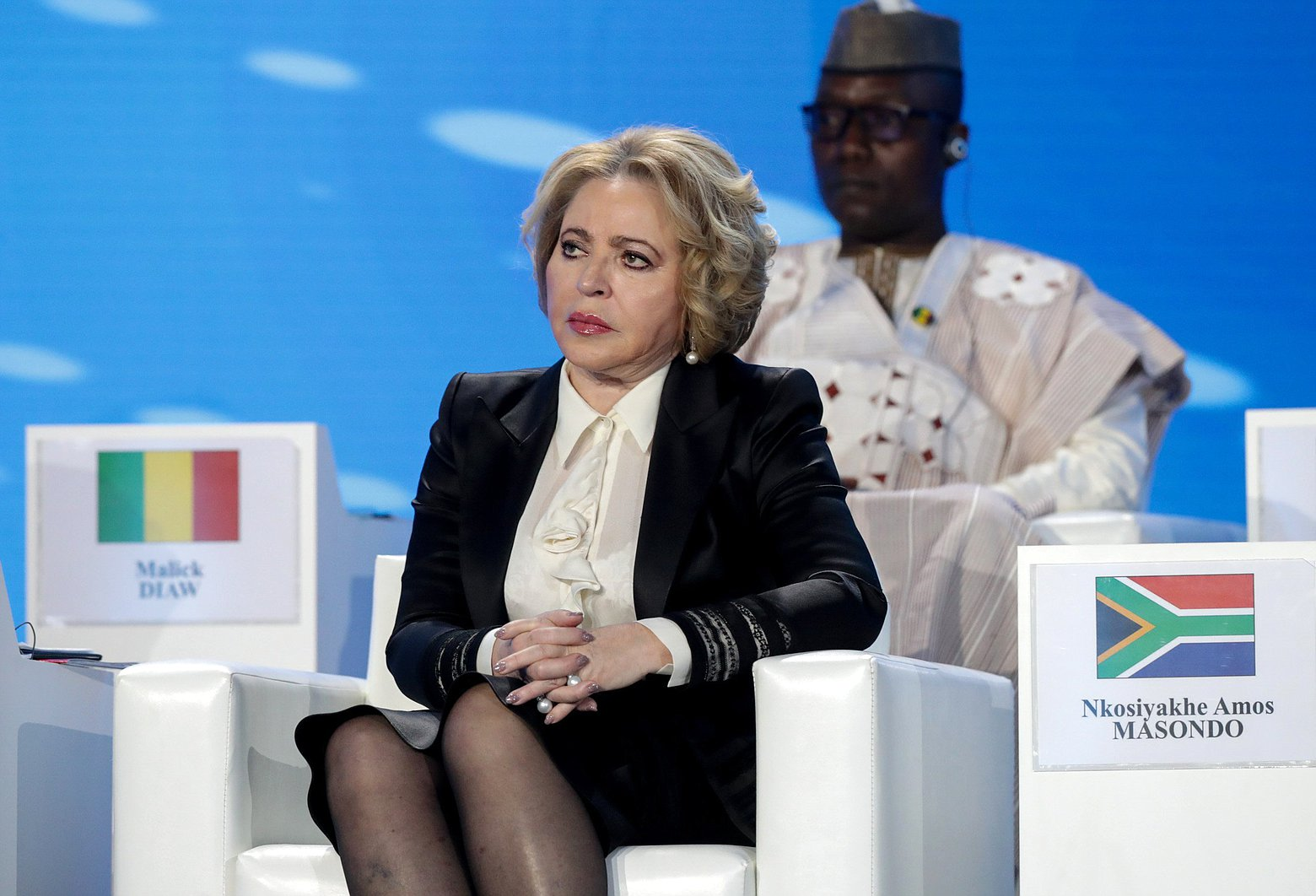
Matviyenko at the “Russia-Africa” parliamentary conference in Moscow on 20 March 2023

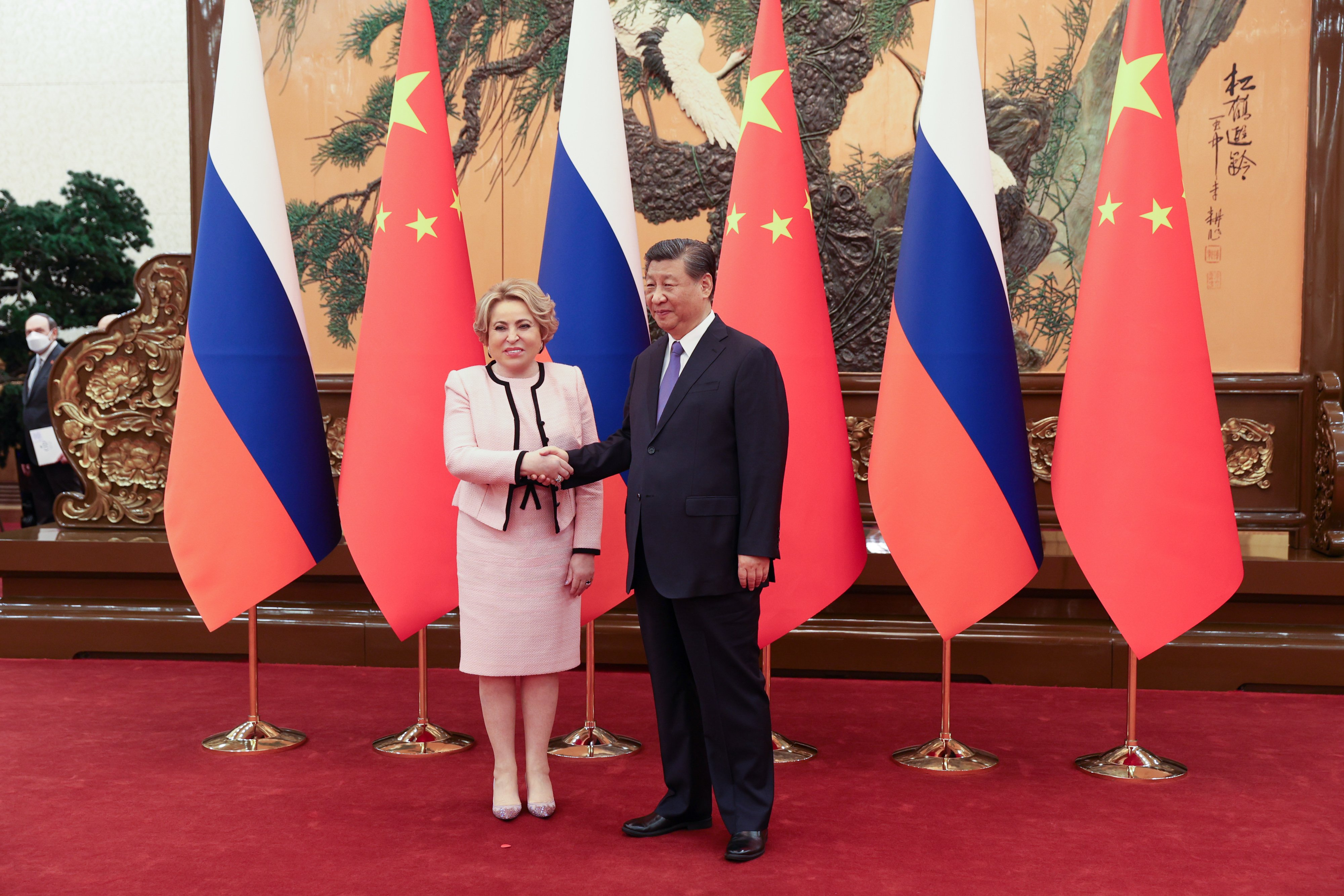
Matviyenko with Chinese president Xi Jinping in Beijing on 10 July 2023

On 22 August 2011, soon after completion of the Saint Petersburg Dam along with the Saint Petersburg Ring Road, Matviyenko resigned from the office of the governor of Saint Petersburg. Georgy Poltavchenko was appointed as acting governor in her place. She was backed by President Dmitry Medvedev as a candidate to head the Federal Assembly or Upper House of the Russian Federation. The previous speaker of the Federation Council, Sergey Mironov, was recalled in May after criticising Matviyenko's handling of Saint Petersburg. The leader of A Just Russia party, Mironov was ousted by the majority United Russia and replaced by an acting speaker Aleksandr Torshin.

As a member of United Russia party, Matviyenko stood in a municipal election in August in order to have legal possibilities to attain the office in the Federation Council. She won the municipal election with more than 95% of the vote, despite having 18% approval rating in July, for which she was criticized by the opposition.

== Sanctions ==
Due to her role in the Crimean status referendum, Matviyenko became one of the first people put under executive sanctions by United States president Barack Obama. The sanctions freeze her assets in the US and ban her from entering the United States. She was put on a sanction list by the United States and Canada on 17 March 2014, the European Union on 21 March 2014, Switzerland on 2 April 2014, Liechtenstein on 17 April 2014, Australia on 19 June 2014, and Ukraine on 16 October 2016.

She was sanctioned by the UK government in 2014 in relation to the Russo-Ukrainian War.

In response to the 2022 Russian invasion of Ukraine, on 6 April 2022 the Office of Foreign Assets Control of the United States Department of the Treasury added Matviyenko to its list of persons sanctioned pursuant to Executive Order 14024.

On 30 July 2025, Matviyenko attended the World Conference of Speakers of Parliament, organized by the Interparliamentary Union in Geneva, Switzerland, in spite of being targeted by Swiss government sanctions. Nevertheless, the Swiss government had issued special permits allowing her to attend anyway, along with a group of 12 other Russian officials also including the Deputy Chairman of the State Duma, Piotr Tolstoy, who was targeted by Swiss sanctions as well. A group of European lawmakers walked out in protest during her speech, in which called she blamed Ukraine for triggering a Russian intervention through its actions in the Donbass, and called for the lifting of sanctions against Russia. Questioned on the matter by the news agency Keystone-SDA, the Federal Department of Foreign Affairs commented that they are responsible for facilitating the entry of official delegates as agreement between the Swiss federal government and the Interpaliamentary Union.

== Family ==
Valentina Matviyenko has a son, Sergey (ru, born 5 May 1973), with her husband, Vladimir Vasilyevich Matviyenko. In May 2003, Sergey Matviyenko was appointed vice-president of the Bank Saint Petersburg. Later he also became vice-president and first vice-president (2005) of Vneshtorgbank. Sergey married Zara Mgoyan, a Russian pop singer of Armenian and Kurdish origin (b. 1983) on 30 April 2004, but they divorced a year later.

== Honours and awards ==
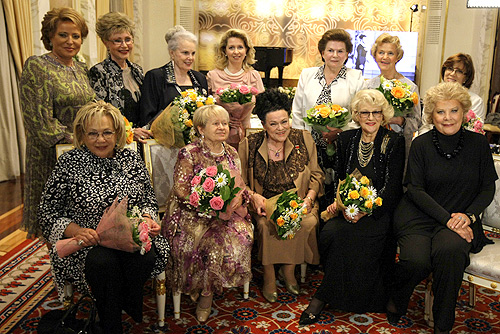
Valentina Matviyenko (top left) on the 80th birthday of singer Lyudmila Zykina (center) in June 2009

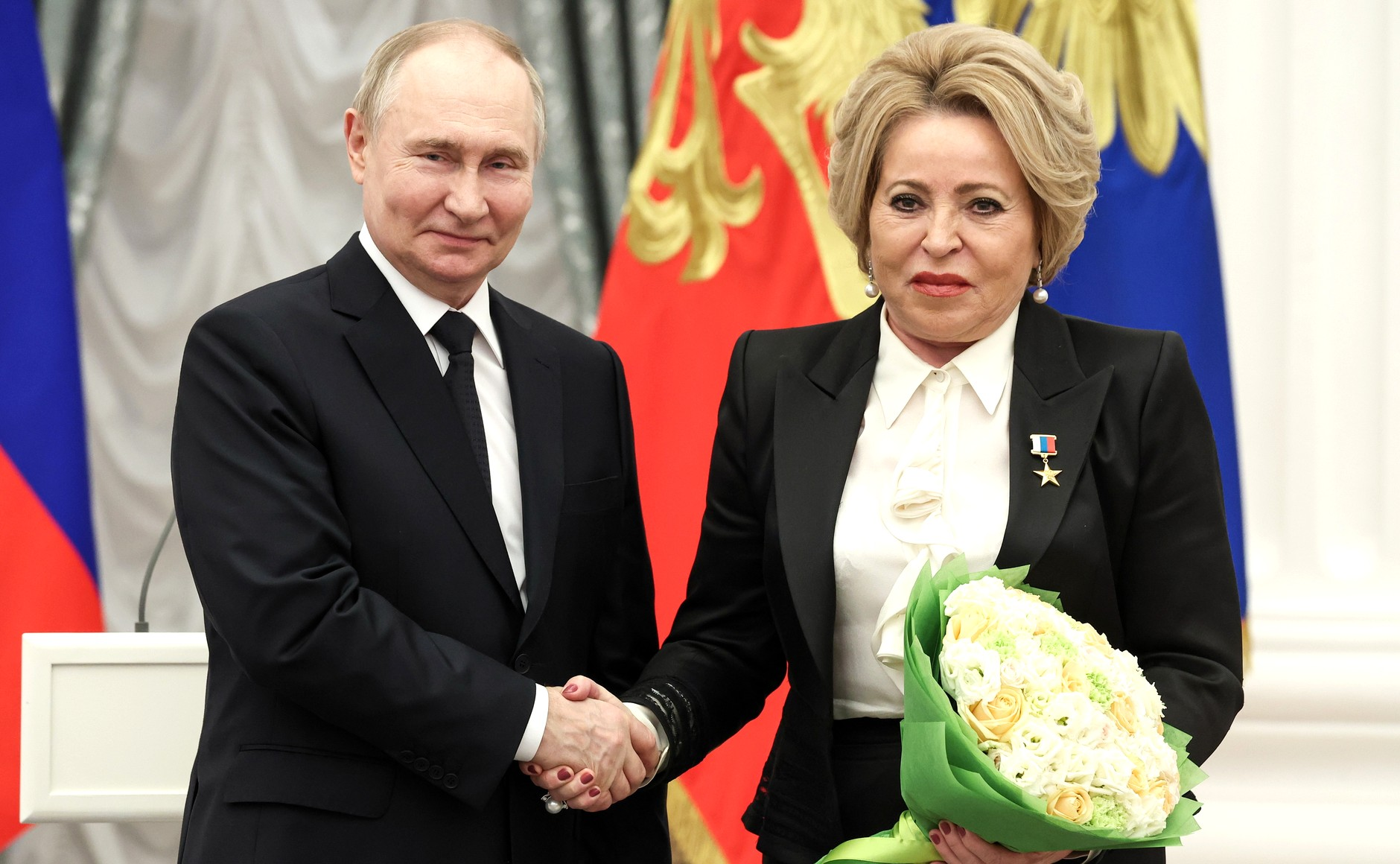
Matviyenko awarded with Hero of Labour by President Putin in May 2024

Russia and the Soviet Union

- Hero of Labour of the Russian Federation (7 April 2024), for special labor services to the state and the people
- Order of St. Andrew the First-Called (28 March 2019), for outstanding services to the Fatherland and many years of fruitful state activity
- P. A. Stolypin Medal, 1st class (28 March 2014), for significant contribution to the successful completion of strategic objectives related to the socio-economic advancement of the nation and for many years of exemplary public service
- Order "For Merit to the Fatherland":
  - 1st class (2014)
  - 2nd class (19 March 2009), for services to the state and personal contribution to the socio-economic development of the city
  - 3rd class (7 April 1999), for services to the state and many years of diligent work
  - 4th class (2003)
- Medal "In Commemoration of the 300th Anniversary of Saint Petersburg" (2003)
- Order of Honour (1996), for services to the state, a large contribution to the foreign policy and ensuring Russia's national interests, courage and dedication shown by the line of duty
- Order of the Red Banner of Labour (17 June 1981)
- Order of the Badge of Honour (1976)

President of the Russian Federation

- Russian Federation Presidential Certificate of Honour (27 January 2010), for active participation in the preparation and conduct of meetings of the State Council
- Russian Federation Presidential Gratitude (2 September 2008), for active participation in preparing and conducting the St. Petersburg International Economic Forum and the meeting of heads of states – members of the Commonwealth of Independent States
- Russian Federation Presidential Gratitude (14 August 1995), for active participation in the preparation and conduct of the 50th anniversary of Victory in the Great Patriotic War of 1941–1945

Departmental awards

- Medal "For Cooperation" (Russian Prosecutor's Office, 2010)
- Medal "For merits in national security" (Security Council, 2009)
- Medal "For Strengthening Customs Community" (Federal Customs Service, 2008)
- Medal "100 Years of St. Petersburg University, GPA MES of Russia" (Ministry of Emergency Situations, 2006)
- Medal "Admiral Kuznetsov" (Ministry of Defence, 2005)
- Medal "For Cooperation With the FSB of Russia" (Federal Security Service, 2004)
- Badge "For Personal Contribution to the Protection and Improvement of Civil Defence" (2004)
- Medal "For Merits in the Field of Civil Aviation" (Interstate Aviation Committee, 2004)
- Medal "For Military Cooperation" (Ministry of Internal Affairs, 2003)
- Medal "For Services to the National Health Care" (Ministry of Health and Social Development, 2003)
- Badge "Excellent Border Troops" (Border Guard Service of Russia, 2003)
- Medal "For Strengthening Military Cooperation" (Ministry of Defence, 1999)

Awards of the federal subjects of Russia

- Honorary Citizen of Kislovodsk (2019)
- Jubilee Badge of the Moscow Oblast Duma "25 Years of the Moscow Oblast Duma" (22 November 2018)
- Honorary Citizen of St. Petersburg (2017)
- Jubilee Badge of the Moscow Oblast Duma "20 Years of the Moscow Oblast Duma" (14 November 2013)
- Badge of Honour "For Services to St. Petersburg" (31 August 2011)
- Badge of Honour "For a Special Contribution to the Development of St. Petersburg" (Legislative Assembly of Saint Petersburg, 2015)

Foreign awards

- Order of Solidarity (Cuba, 2022)
- Order "For Contribution to theDevelopment of Cooperation" (Turkmenistan, 2022)
- Dustliq Order (Uzbekistan, 2021), for active efforts and personal contribution to strengthening friendship, strategic partnership and alliance between the Republic of Uzbekistan and the Russian Federation, full support for the development of inter-parliamentary ties, assistance in the effective implementation of programs and projects of Uzbek-Russian multifaceted cooperation, including those aimed at the fullest disclosure of the potential of interregional cooperation and bilateral cultural and humanitarian exchange
- Order of Francysk Skaryna (Belarus, 2019), for significant personal contribution to the strengthening of friendly relations and the development of cooperation between the Republic of Belarus and the Russian Federation
- Order of Friendship, 1st class (Kazakhstan, 2019), for great contribution to the strengthening and development of bilateral relations between the Republic of Kazakhstan and the Russian Federation
- Dostlug Order (Azerbaijan, 2019), for special services in strengthening cooperation and mutual relations between the Azerbaijan Republic and the Russian Federation
- Order of the Republika Srpska (Republika Srpska, Bosnia and Herzegovina, 2018)
- Order of Friendship, 2nd class (Kazakhstan, 2016)
- National Order of Merit (Malta, 2013)
- National Order of the Legion of Honour (France, 2009)
- Order "For The Great Love of Independent Turkmenistan" (Turkmenistan, 2009), for great contribution to strengthening the Turkmen-Russian relations
- Order of the Friendship of Peoples (Belarus, 2009)
- Knights Cross of the Order of the Lion of Finland (2009)
- Medal "For Outstanding Contributions to the National Year of China and Russia" (China, 2008)
- Grand Cross of the Order of Honour (Greece, 2007)
- Order of Princess Olga, 3rd class (Ukraine, 2002), for a significant personal contribution to the development of Ukrainian-Russian cooperation, active participation in ensuring the Year of Ukraine in the Russian Federation
- Decoration of Honour for Services to the Republic of Austria (2001)

Religious awards

- Order of St. Sergius;
  - 1st class (Russian Orthodox Church, 2010) – in consideration of assistance to the Russian Orthodox Church
- Order of St Princess Olga, 1st class (Russian Orthodox Church, 2006) and 2nd class (2001)

Prizes

- Prize of the Russian Federation in Science and Technology (2010)

Other Awards

- Pushkin Medal (MAPRYAL, 2003) – "For outstanding services in the Russian language"

== See also ==
- Saint Petersburg City Administration

== Notes ==
Political offices
Preceded by Viktor Cherkesov	Presidential Envoy to the Northwestern Federal District; 2003	Succeeded by Ilya Klebanov
Preceded by Alexander Beglov; Acting	Governor of Saint Petersburg; 2003–2011	Succeeded by Georgy Poltavchenko
Preceded by Aleksander Torshin; Acting	Chairwoman of the Federation Council; 2011–present	Succeeded by Incumbent
