= Volokhonsky =

Volokhonsky, feminine" Volokhonskaya is a Russian Jewish surname. Notable people with the surname include:

- Anri Volokhonsky (1936–2017), Russian poet and translator
- Larissa Volokhonsky, (born 1945), translator of Russian Jewish descent
- Lev Volokhonsky (1945–2003), Soviet geologist, dissident and human rights activist
