= A Nasty Story =

Short story by Fyodor Dostoyevsky

- Short story by Fyodor Dostoevsky
- Original title: Скверный анекдот (Skverny anekdot)
- Translator: Constance Garnett; Jessie Coulson; Roger Cockrell et al.
- Language: Russian
- Genre: Satire

Publication

"A Nasty Story" (Russian: Скверный анекдот, Skverny anekdot), also translated as "A Disgraceful Affair", "A Most Unfortunate Incident", "An Unpleasant Predicament", "A Bad Business" and "A Nasty Anecdote", is a satirical short story by Fyodor Dostoevsky. It was published in 1862 in Dostoevsky's magazine Vremya.

The story is about a general in the civil service, Ivan Pralinksky, who has been proudly defending his liberal-humanistic social ideals to two other generals. On his way home, he spontaneously decides to test his theory by presenting himself, uninvited, at the wedding feast of one of his lowliest subordinates.

== Plot summary ==
After drinking a bit too much with two fellow civil servants, the protagonist, Ivan Ilyich Pralinsky, expounds on his desire to embrace a philosophy based on kindness to those in lower status social positions. After leaving the initial gathering, Ivan happens upon the wedding celebration of one of his subordinates – Pseldonymov. He decides to put his philosophy into action and, to the dismay of the host and his guests, presents himself at the party. Being a non-drinker and completely out of his element, the General fails spectacularly in his quest: far from winning anyone's admiration, a series of increasingly inappropriate and scandalous events unfold. In the end he is "put to bed in the only available place – the nuptial couch."

== Themes ==
The translator Jessie Coulson, in the introduction to a 1966 Penguin publication that includes the story, states of "A Nasty Story":

Its theme is the terrible gulf between a man's idea of himself, his ideals, and his motives, and what they prove to be in the harsh light of reality. Its cruelty lies in the recognition that the tragedy of failure to come up to one's own expectations ... is essentially comic... .

Richard Pevear proposes, in his introduction, that the story's target is "the spirit of reform that spread through Russia in the early years of the reign of the 'tsar-liberator' Alexander II, who came to the throne in 1855."
