= Feliks Ravdonikas =

Russian composer

Felix Vladislavovich Ravdonikas (Russian: Фе́ликс Владисла́вович Равдоника́с; 22 February 1937 in Leningrad – 11 August 2011 in Saint Petersburg) was a Russian organologist and musicologist, musician and composer, graphic artist, actor, mathematician, ethnographer, designer and craftsman specializing in flutes and other authentic musical instruments.

== Early life ==
Ravdonikas was born in the family of marxist archeologist Vladislav Josifovitch Ravdonikas and avant-garde artist Liudmila Ivanova (1904–1977, student of Kusma Petrov-Vodkin and Pavel Filonov) which defined his early and profound interest in arts and art history. As a teenager Ravdonikas traveled to Staraya Ladoga where his father was the director of archaeological excavations. There he made an important friendship with artist Oleg Pochtenny (1927–1997) who introduced him to etching. Passion for fine arts and ancient artifacts was combined in Ravdonikas with the love for sports, music and musical instruments. At his graduation at Shtiglitz Higher School of Art and Design in Leningrad he presented a project of modern module kitchen design, innovative for that time in Soviet Union .

== Craftsman and theorist ==
In 1970s Ravdonikas emerged as one of the few Soviet specialists in early musical instruments. His works became acclaimed outside the USSR. In 1978 he was elected a fellow of the Fellowship of Makers and Researchers of Historic Instruments. Ravdonikas was occasionally invited to the State Hermitage and other museums of Leningrad with restoration assignments. His reproduction of an original Hotteterre baroque flute for the Museum of the State Institute of Music, Leningrad, was displayed at an exhibition in the US in 1980. Ravdonikas donated a set of wax toneholes and embouchures of flutes to the Museum of Musical Instruments in Leningrad. Some of his instruments belong to the Library of Congress.

Throughout 1970s Ravdonikas continued his father's studies of the Onega Lake rock carvings. Ravdonikas was the first scholar who interpreted Onega objects, symbolic figures that probably date back to 5000 BCE, in the context of their astronomical orientation. His finding was that the figures fix a complete Lunar 18.6-year's cycle and that their complex was a lunar calendar.

In 1980 Ravdonikas restored a Peter Kinzing's music automaton from the State Hermitage collection. Writing his report of the restoration works led Feliks to the idea of putting together a theoretic inquiry in what he later named 'spatial musical symbolism'. Since about that time he concentrated predominantly on musicology.

== Years of obscurity ==
By the beginning of 1980s Ravdonikas was known in the Leningrad counter-culture as a polymath whose interests stretch far beyonds arts. Many local intellectuals as well as painters, poets, and musicians (such as poet Anri Volokhonsky and musician Andrey Reshetin) gravitated towards the informal philosophical society in his kitchen where they exchanged ideas on various disciplines, from anthropology to mathematics and genetics and played music. Ravdonikas generously shared his vast knowledge and directly influenced many scholars. One of the tangible consequences of these meeting was the so-called Saint Petersburg authenticity movement that aimed at reviving Russian baroque music by performing it on authentic instruments and in historical settings.

During the last 20 years of his life Ravdonikas rarely left Saint Petersburg. Hidden from the public eye and gradually becoming a living legend for the selected few, he studied mathematics and pythagorean theory of music and was teaching his friends. He was teaching a special course for students of Saint-Petersburg State University Faculty of Philosophy. According to one of his last interviews, Ravdonikas lived in austerity.

Ravdonikas died in August 2011 and was buried in Komarovo near his highly acclaimed father. His daughter resides in Germany, his son lives in Russia.

== Legacy ==
Only a small part of Ravdonikas' legacy is published, mostly by his student Andrey Reshetin. Much of Ravdonikas' writings, especially in genetics and ethnography, was lost. Before 1991 he was able to publish only two short pieces, although they were edited, as he complained in one of his interviews, 'beyond any recognition'.

== In popular culture ==
Ravdonikas in 1981 played a role in Dinara Asanova film 'Chto by ty vybral?' (What would you choose?).

He wrote music for Lev Dodin's 1987 play, A Gentle Creature, which was a theatre adoptation of the Fyodor Dostoyevsky's story by the same title.

Musicologist Liudmila Kovnatskaya called Ravdonikas "a rare type of Renaissance man living in our times".

Poet Anri Volokhonsky in his "Works on Harmony" mentions that that work was a result of conversations with Ravdonikas, and that Ravdonicas "built the first organ in Russia". (which is not accurate, since first organs were built in Russia in 16th century).

== Publications ==
- Равдоникас Ф. В. Музыкальный синтаксис: курс фундаментальной теории музыки для философского факультета СПбГУ. CПб., 2002. — 226
- Равдоникас Ф. В. Пифагорейская система музыкальных тонов // Серия Проблемы музыкознания, вып. 2; Аспекты теоретического музыкознания. Сборник научных трудов, Л., 1989, с. 8–44
- Raudonikas F. Classification system of the Pitches with Various Absolute Height // FOMRHI Quarterly. No 21
