= Vitaly Arkhangelsky =

Russian entrepreneur (born 1975)

Vitaly Dmitrievich Arkhangelsky
- Born: 23 May 1975 (age 50); Almaty, Kazakhstan
- Occupation: Entrepreneur

Vitaly Dmitrievich Arkhangelsky (born 23 May 1975 in Almaty, Kazakhstan) is a Russian entrepreneur with interests in shipping and insurance. The Russian authorities are seeking his extradition from France, where he and his family currently live, to face charges of economic crimes. Arkhangelsky claims that he is a victim of expropriation and persecution by the associates of St.Petersburg ex-mayor Valentina Matvienko. His case has been widely reported in the Russian and international media.

== Early life and education ==
He studied economics at St Petersburg State University, and pursued postgraduate research at the State University of Economics and Finance, also in St Petersburg. He additionally trained in Germany and at the Trondheim Business School in Norway.

== Career ==
After completing his studies, he worked in the insurance sector. This led to a focus on shipping and to the foundation in 1999 of the Oslo Marine Group (OMG), of which he is president and majority shareholder. OMG is a holding company interested in insurance, port services and freight forwarding. It expanded rapidly, opening representative offices in London and Hiroshima and acquiring major real estate assets in Russia, including the Vyborg Port and Western Terminal, a site within the port of St Petersburg, with redevelopment plans by the European Bank for Reconstruction and Development. OMG also expanded its fleet and placed orders for building new ships.

These core assets of OMG are the subject of a legal dispute between Arkhangelsky and Bank of St. Petersburg, from which OMG had secured loans to finance its expansion. In 2009, a Russian court ruled that the acquisition of Western Terminal by Sevzapalyans, believed to be controlled by the Bank of St Petersburg, was illegal.

In 2010, these disputes were in progress when criminal investigations into Arkhangelsky were initiated in Russia and charges made. Arkhangelsky was alleged by the Russian authorities to have laundered 56.5 million roubles fraudulently acquired from Morskoi Aktsionerni Bank (MAB).

== Fleeing to France and legal counteroffensive ==
In 2009, Arkhangelsky and his family fled to Nice, France, where he claimed political asylum. This was followed by a Russian extradition request on charges of fraud. A judge in Nice freed him on a bail of 300,000 euros pending a hearing, which can last many months.

From France, Arkhangelsky mounted a legal counteroffensive, claiming that he was a victim of a campaign to ruin him orchestrated by the ex-Mayor of St Petersburg, Valentina Matvienko. He argued that the Bank St Petersburg refused to allow OMG to restructure its debts with the deliberate intention of bankrupting it and taking control of its assets. In August 2011, he issued a writ of summons in the District Court of Nicosia, Cyprus, against “three shadowy Cypriot companies”, which he claimed were set up exclusively for the purpose of stealing his assets for the benefit of a "group of conspirators", which "probably" included the ex-Mayor of St. Petersburg's and the ex-Chief of Police.
