= The Adolescent =

1875 novel by Fyodor Dostoevsky

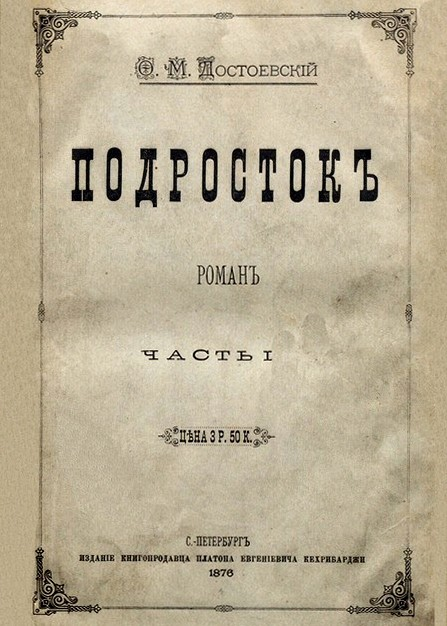
- First Russian edition
- Author: Fyodor Dostoevsky
- Original title: Подростокъ
- Language: Russian
- Genre: Bildungsroman, philosophical novel, psychological novel
- Published: 1875
- Publisher: Otechestvennye zapiski
- Publication place: Russia

The Adolescent (Russian: Подросток, romanized: Podrostok), also translated as A Raw Youth or An Accidental Family, is a novel by Russian writer Fyodor Dostoevsky, first published in monthly installments in 1875 in the Russian literary magazine Otechestvennye Zapiski. Originally, Dostoevsky had created the work under the title Discord.

The novel was not considered to be a success after its publication in Russia, and it is generally thought to be not on the same level as Dostoevsky's other major novels of the period. Some modern critics value it highly and consider it to be one of his most underestimated works.

== Plot ==
19-year-old Arkady Makarovich Dolgoruky is the adopted son of the former serf Makar Ivanovich Dolgoruky and the illegitimate son of the provincial nobleman Andrei Petrovich Versilov. Having come of age he moves from the country to St. Petersburg. Versilov lives there with Arkady's mother Sofya Andreevna, and with his legitimate daughter Anna Andreyevna.

Arkady is in possession of two important letters. The first letter, received from an acquaintance named Kraft, proves that Versilov isn't entitled to an inheritance. Versilov wins a court case, but afterwards takes the letter to his opponent, Prince Sergej Petrowitsj Sokolsky, and they share the money. However the prince soon loses his money in a casino.

The second letter, received from his teacher's wife Maria in Moscow, is a request by the young widow Katerina Nikolaevna Akhmakova to have her father, Prince Nikolay Ivanovitch Sokolsky, declared financially incompetent due to insanity. He is unrelated to the other Prince Sokolsky. This letter is sewn into Arkady's jacket, until it is stolen by his former schoolmate Lambert.

Arkady's sister Liza gets pregnant by Prince Sergej Petrowitsj Sokolsky. Arkady's half-sister Anna is betrothed to Prince Nikolay Ivanovitch Sokolsky, but he has a younger rival. Versilov and Arkady are both romantically interested in Katerina.

Lambert tries to blackmail Katerina with the stolen letter and a gun, but he's knocked down by Versilov, who shoots himself in the shoulder. Prince Nikolay dies, and his daughter Katerina leaves the country.

== Characters ==
- Arkady Makarovich Dolgoruky is the 19-year-old protagonist of the novel. He took the name Dolgoruky from his aged adoptive father, even though he is the illegitimate son of the dissipated landowner Versilov. Arkady's dream is to "become a Rothschild" (i.e. become fabulously wealthy like a member of the famed Rothschild family). In his quest for wealth Arkady becomes entangled with socialist conspirators and a young widow, whose future is somehow dependent on a document that Arkady has sewn into his jacket.
- Makar Ivanovich Dolgoruky is an aging peasant and Arkady's legal father. He is formerly a serf of the Versilov estate. He is a respected wandering religious pilgrim who takes the role of the "holy fool" in Dostoevsky's works. At his death, he professes a love for God and Christianly virtues.
- Andrei Petrovich Versilov is Arkady's biological father and a dissipated landowner. Scandals swirl around him, including a history with a mentally unstable girl and rumors of being a Catholic. At one point, Versilov and Arkady are competing for the affections of the same young woman.
- Tatyana Pavlovna, a single older woman, is a friend of the family. She helps them out financially and practically.
- Anna Andreyevna is a half-sister to Arkady and becomes the fiancée of Prince Nikolay.
- Katerina Nikolaevna Akhmakova is a young widow and romantic interest of both Versilov and Arkady. A letter sewn to Arkady's jacket could have dire consequences for her future.
- Liza is Arkady's sister. She became pregnant by Prince Sergey Petrovitch.
- Prince Sergey Petrovitch is the fiancé of Arkady's sister Liza. He is deeply in debt.
- Prince Nikolay Ivanovitch is an old man, weak and sensitive. Katerina Nikolaevna is his daughter.
- Monsieur Touchard was Arkady's old school teacher. His strict nature and disrespect of Arkady made a deep impression on the protagonist.
- Sofya Andreevna Dolgoruky is Arkady's mother. She was a serf on Versilov's estate before emancipation and married to Makar Ivanovich. She became Versilov's mistress but remained married to Makar Ivanovich.
- Vassin and Kraft are acquaintances of Arkady who have an important impact on his life.
- Lambert was a schoolmate of Arkady who bullied him. As an adult he became a blackmailer.

== Themes ==
The novel chronicles the life of 19-year-old intellectual, Arkady Dolgoruky, illegitimate child of the controversial and womanizing landowner Versilov. A focus of the novel is the recurring conflict between father and son, particularly in ideology, which represents the battles between the conventional "old" way of thinking in the 1840s and the new nihilistic point of view of the youth of 1860s Russia. The young of Arkady's time embraced a very negative opinion of Russian culture in contrast to Western or European culture.

As Arkady navigates the complexities of love, family, and societal norms, he grapples with existential questions and moral dilemmas. Dostoevsky explores themes of morality, free will, and the search for meaning in a rapidly changing world. The novel is a psychological exploration of Arkady's internal conflicts, set against the backdrop of a society in flux. With its intricate character portrayals and philosophical depth, "The Adolescent" stands as a quintessential work in Dostoevsky's literary canon, offering profound insights into the human condition and the challenges of coming of age.

Another main theme is Arkady's development and utilization of his "idea" in his life, mainly a form of rebellion against society (and his father) through the rejection of attending a university, and the making of money and living independently, onto the eventual aim of becoming excessively wealthy and powerful.

The question of emancipation or what to do with the newly freed serfs in the face of the corrupting influence of the West looms over the novel. Arkady's mother is a former serf and Versilov is a landowner, and understanding their relationship is ultimately at the center of Arkady's quest to find out who Versilov is and what he did to his mother. Answering the question of emancipation, in Dostoevsky's novel, has to do with how to educate the serfs and address the damage of Petrine reforms in order to construct a new Russian identity.

The novel was written and serially published while Leo Tolstoy was publishing Anna Karenina. Dostoevsky's novel about the "accidental family" stands in contrast to Tolstoy's novel about the aristocratic Russian family.

== Critical opinions ==
Ronald Hingley, author of Russians and Society and a specialist in Dostoevsky's works, thought this novel a bad one, whereas Richard Pevear (in the introduction to his and Larissa Volokhonsky's 2003 translation of the novel), vigorously defended its worth.

Hermann Hesse appreciated the novel for its art of dialogue, "psychological seerism and passages full of confessed revelations about Russian people". He also noted that its ironical manner differs from other Dostoevsky novels.

== English translations ==
This is a list of the unabridged English translations of the novel:

- Constance Garnett (1916, as A Raw Youth)
- Andrew R. MacAndrew (1971, as The Adolescent)
- Richard Freeborn (1994, as An Accidental Family)
- Richard Pevear and Larissa Volokhonsky (2003, as The Adolescent)
- Dora O'Brien (2017, as The Adolescent)

== Bibliography ==
- Brumfield, William С. (2015), "The West and Russia: Concepts of Inferiority in Dostoevsky's "The Adolescent"", Informatsionnyi Gumanitarnyi Portal "Znanie. Ponimanie. Umenie" (1), archived from the original on 24 May 2015.
