= Passenger Port of St. Petersburg =

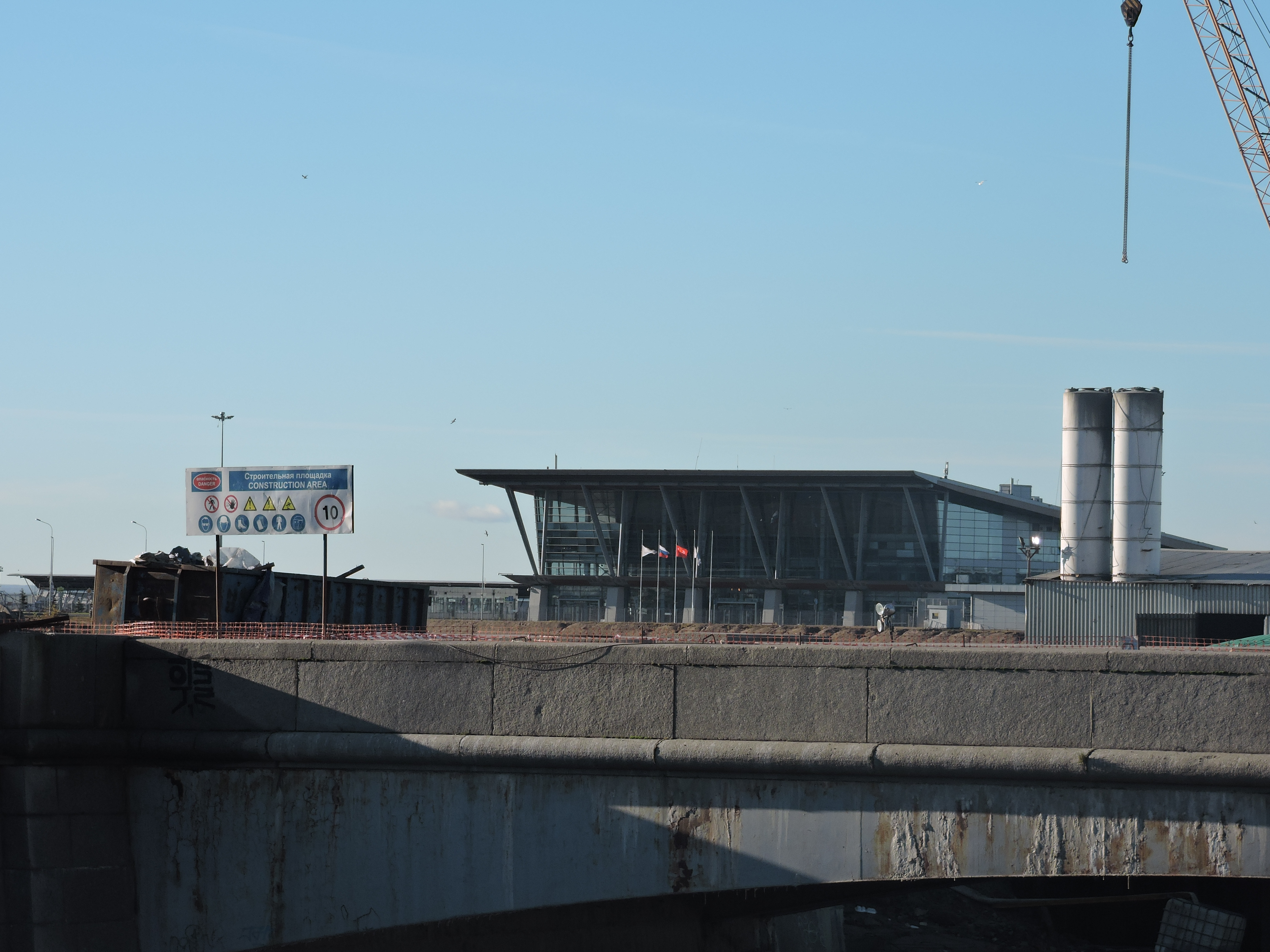
- Click on the map for a fullscreen view

Location
- Country: Russia
- Location: St. Petersburg, Vasilievsky Island
- Coordinates: 59°56′48″N 30°11′32″E

Details
- Opened: July 28, 2007
- Operated by: Great Port of Saint Petersburg
- Owned by: Marine Facade Management Company (builder)
- Type of harbour: Passenger sea terminus
- No. of berths: 3
- No. of wharfs: 7
- No. of piers: 0

Statistics
- Passenger traffic: 12,000 per day
- Website www.postspb.ru

The Passenger Port of St. Petersburg (Russian: Пассажирский порт Санкт-Петербург) is a passenger port in Saint Petersburg, Russia. It was completed on 27 May 2011 and was officially handed over to the city government. It is located on reclaimed alluvial territories of the Marine Facade of Vasilevsky island fronting the Gulf of Finland on the Baltic Sea.

== History ==
The necessity for new passenger terminal was caused by the inability of the existing Marine Terminal to allow cruise ships longer than 200 meters. As a consequence, large passenger ships arrived in the commercial port of St. Petersburg. In 2002, the St. Petersburg administration proposed to build a modern complex for the reception of cruise ships. The corresponding government order to begin construction of the marine passenger terminal was signed in 2005 by Russian Prime Minister Mikhail Fradkov. In 2006, the Marine Facade Company built:

- 35 hectares of reclaimed land
- The technological channel on the water area of seaport for the building of moorings
- Access technological road
- The dividing dam

By July 28, 2007, the educational sailing vessel named Young Baltiets was moored at berth number seven.

In 2008, two moorings, building the cruise terminal and coastal constructions necessary for work, were constructed and transferred in the summer.

On September 10, 2008 the port accepted the first passenger cruise liner, a 16-deck Italian vessel named Costa Mediterranea. In August 2009, a hydrofoil line to Peterhof and the Winter Palace was started.

In 2011, work on the passenger port was completed and the newly completed Marine Facade sea passenger port was officially handed over to the city government.

Port building schedule
Stage	Year	Harbor walls	Note
1	2008	Two walls	With complex necessary port structures
2	2009	Three walls	
3	2010	Two walls	
