= Anri Volokhonsky =

Russian poet and translator (1936–2017)

- Анри Гиршевич Волохонский
- Born: Anri Girshevich Volokhonsky; 19 March 1936; Leningrad, Russian SFSR, USSR
- Died: 8 April 2017 (aged 81); Rexingen, Horb am Neckar, BaWü, Germany
- Education: Leningrad Chemical and Pharmaceutical Institute
- Occupations: Poet and translator
- Children: 4
- Relatives: Larissa Volokhonsky (sister)
- Writing career
- Language: Russian
- Years active: 1950s-2016
- Notable awards: Andrei Bely Prize

Anri Girshevich Volokhonsky (Russian: Анри Гиршевич Волохонский, 19 March 1936 – 8 April 2017) was a Russian poet and translator.

== Biography ==
=== Early years ===
Volokhonsky was born in Leningrad and graduated from LCPhI with a degree in chemistry. In 1973, he emigrated to Israel and then moved to West Germany in 1985. Between 1985 and 1995, Volokhonsky lived in Munich, where he worked for Radio Free Europe/Radio Liberty, and in 1995 he moved to Tübingen. His sister, Larissa Volokhonsky, eventually became a translator.

=== Career ===
Volokhonsky began writing poetry in the 1950s. He published several books of poetry, some of them together with Alexei Khvostenko. Most of the poetry is ironic and is considered to be descended from Oberiu. Perhaps his most famous piece was lyrics on "Canzona by Francesco da Milano", written by Vladimir Vavilov, the song called "The City of Gold" (Russian: Город Золотой). The song, in turn, would become a hit in the 1980s when it was performed by Aquarium for the soundtrack for the film Assa. Volokhonsky also worked with Leonid Fyodorov, the frontman of the Auktyon, and wrote texts for his albums.

He also translated Catullus and fragments of Finnegans Wake by James Joyce into Russian.

=== Death ===
Volokhonsky died on 8 April 2017 in Rexingen, where he had lived since 2004.

== Bibliography ==
- Devyaty Renessans (Девятый Ренессанс, Haifa, 1977).
- Stikhi dlya Ksenii (Стихи для Ксении, Tiberias, 1978).
- Chetyre Poemy ob Odnom (Четыре поэмы об одном, Tiberias, 1981).
- Roman-Pokoynichek, (Роман - Покойничек, New York, 1982), a novel.
- Stikhotvoreniya (Стихотворения, Ann Arbor, 1983).
- Basni A. Kh. V. (Басни А.Х.В., Paris, 1984), with Alexei Khvostenko.
- Bytiye i Apokalipsis (Бытие и Апокалипсис, Jerusalem, 1984).
- Smert Pu-i (Смерть Пу-и, New York, 1984).
- Tetrad Igreyny (Тетрадь Игрейны, Jerusalem, 1984).
- Pokhvala Toporovu (Похвала Топорову, Hamburg, 1986).
- Shkura Bubna (Шкура бубна, Jerusalem, 1986).
- Izvest (Известь, Paris, 1990).
- Stikhi o Prichinakh (Стихи о причинах, Moscow, 1990).
- Gorodskiye Polya (Городские поля, Paris, 1991).
- Povest o Lane i Tarbagane (Повеcть о Лане и Тарбагане, Paris, 1991).
- Anyutiny Gryadki (Анютины грядки, Perm, 1994).
- Tiveriadskiye Poemy (Тивериадские поэмы, Moscow, 2001).
- Berloga Pchyol (Берлога пчёл, Tver, 2004).
- Vospominaniya o Davno Pozabytom (Воспоминания о давно позабытом, Moscow, 2007).
