= Jessie Coulson =

- Born: Jessie Senior; 1 September 1903; Potter Newton, Leeds, England
- Died: 16 April 1987 (aged 83); Reading, Berkshire
- Education: University of Leeds
- Occupation: Lexicographer
- Employer: Oxford English Dictionary (OED)
- Known for: dictionary compiler and translator
- Spouse: Edward Auty Coulson

Jessie Coulson, born Jessie Senior (1 September 1903 – 16 April 1987), was a British dictionary compiler and a Russian translator. She was the first woman to be credited for her work on a version of the Oxford English Dictionary.

== Early life and education ==
Coulson was born in 1903 in Potter Newton, Leeds, England. Her parents were Maud Jessie (born Catley), and Joseph Senior, who was a solicitor's clerk. She had a younger sister and two younger brothers. She went to high school in Leeds before studying English at the University of Leeds. Her younger sister was also a student, and she introduced her to Oxford-educated Edward Auty Coulson. Coulson was a chemist. There may have been links to Tolkien, as it was his Tolkien's tutor Kenneth Sisam who recommended Coulson as a potential employee of the Oxford English Dictionary, following news of her first class degree.

== Career ==
Coulson was employed by the OED and her first assignment was to work on a volume that related to the main dictionary. It was a book that catalogued the words that had been discovered that were too recent to be included in the main dictionary. In 1929 she married Edward Auty Coulson and in time they had two children.

The first edition of the Shorter Oxford English Dictionary was published in February 1933. The authors included Coulson and she was the first woman to be credited for her work on a version of the OED. She had worked in the first edition of the Little Oxford Dictionary in 1930 but she had received no credit. She was included in the second edition in 1937.

Coulson had taught herself Russian, and she translated books, including novels by Dostoievsky. In 1959, "A Nest of Gentlefolk: and Other Stories" was published. It was translated from Russian by Coulson and in 1965, "Russian Short Stories, XXth Century", was published. It had been edited by the Soviet philologist Nadejda Gorodetzky and Coulson.

== Death ==
Coulson died at her home in Reading, Berkshire, in 1987.
