= Marine Facade =

Sea Facade (reclaimed land) Russian: Морской фасад Намыв Morskoi Fasad
- Reclaimed land
- Marine Facade
- Location within Saint Petersburg Location within Russia
- Coordinates: 59°56′32″N 30°10′57″E
- Country: Russia
- Federal city: Saint Petersburg
- The decision was made on development of the western part of Vasilievsky Island.: July 1, 2004
- Marine Facade Management Company began.: October 25, 2006
- Project of a lay-out of territory of the Neva Bay in the Gulf of Finland off the west coast of Vasilievsky Island was confirmed.: November 13, 2007

Area
  - Total: 4.767 km^{2} (1.841 sq mi)
- "Marine Facade Management Company official site". Marine Facade Management Company.

The Sea (Marine) Facade is a project of expansion of St. Petersburg, on Vasilievsky Island at the Neva river's mouth. In these new territories, the Passenger Port of St. Petersburg was created, along with a considerable amount of residential and commercial space. The Western Rapid Diameter highway was built across these lands.

This project was implemented within the framework of a public-private partnership between the Saint Petersburg City Administration and the Marine Facade Management Company. The primary goal of this project was to build the Passenger Port of St. Petersburg by reclaiming new territories of 476 hectares from the Neva Bay in the Gulf of Finland. The total cost of the project is an estimated 3 billion dollars.

The project built over 1.5 million square metres of office space, 3 million square metres of residential space, as well as retail, entertainment and social facilities, two subway stations, and a marina.

In 2008, the first phase of work was finished, and an area of 150 hectares was reclaimed for the port building. Reclamation of an additional 20 hectares for the Western Rapid Diameter and the construction of buildings subsequently began.

== Construction chronology ==
2006

- The area of 35 hectares was reclaimed.
- The underwater channel for the moorings in the port's aquatic area was built.
- Construction of the service access road was finished.
- The dividing dam was built.

2007

- The reclaimed area was about 80 hectares (half of this area was intended to be under the passenger terminal). As of July, more than 70% of the work had been done.
- By July 28 (Navy Day), the training sailing ship named Young Baltiets had moored at berth 7 and the Passenger Port of St. Petersburg was launched.

2008

- In May, the builders announced the beginning of sale of space for the residential and commercial buildings on the reclaimed lands.

2009

- In August, a hydrofoil line to Peterhof and the Winter Palace was launched.
- In September, the sea passenger port accepted the first cruise ship with passengers.

2011

- In May, work on the passenger port was finished and the newly completed Marine Facade sea passenger port was officially handed over to the city government.

2014

- On June 25, the passenger port serviced seven cruise ships in its seven berths and four terminals—more than 12,000 passengers combined.
