= Richard Pevear and Larissa Volokhonsky =

Couple known for their collaborative literary translations

Richard Pevear Larissa Volokhonsky
- Born: Richard Pevear; 21 April 1943 (age 83); Waltham, Massachusetts, US Larissa Volokhonsky; 1 October 1945 (age 81); Leningrad, Russian SFSR, USSR
- Education: Allegheny College; UVA; Leningrad State University; YDS; SVOTS
- Children: 2
- Relatives: Anri Volokhonsky
- Writing career
- Language: English and Russian
- Years active: 1985-present
- Notable awards: PEN/Book-of-the-Month Club Translation Prize
- Marriage: 1982-present

Richard Pevear and Larissa Volokhonsky are literary translators best known for their collaborative English translations of classic Russian literature. Individually, Pevear has also translated into English works from French, Italian, and Greek. The couple's collaborative translations have been nominated three times and twice won the PEN/Book-of-the-Month Club Translation Prize (for Tolstoy's Anna Karenina and Dostoevsky's The Brothers Karamazov). Their translation of Dostoevsky's The Idiot also won the first Efim Etkind Translation Prize.

== Pevear ==
Pevear was born in Waltham, Massachusetts, on 21 April 1943. Pevear earned a B.A. degree from Allegheny College in 1964, and a M.A. degree from the University of Virginia in 1965. He has taught at the University of New Hampshire, The Cooper Union, Mount Holyoke College, Columbia University, and the University of Iowa. In 1998, he joined the faculty of the American University of Paris (AUP), where he taught courses in Russian literature and translation. In 2007, he was named Distinguished Professor of Comparative Literature at AUP, and in 2009 he became Distinguished Professor Emeritus. Besides translating Russian classics, Pevear also translated from the French (Alexandre Dumas, Yves Bonnefoy, Jean Starobinski), Italian (Alberto Savinio), Spanish, and Greek (Aias, by Sophocles, in collaboration with Herbert Golder). He is also the author of two books of poems (Night Talk and Other Poems, and Exchanges). Pevear is mostly known for his work in collaboration with Volokhonsky on translations of Russian classics.

== Volokhonsky ==
Volokhonsky (Russian: Лариса Волохонская) was born into a Jewish family in Leningrad, now St. Petersburg, on the first of October 1945. After graduating from Leningrad State University with a degree in mathematical linguistics, she worked in the Institute of Marine Biology (Vladivostok) and travelled extensively in Sakhalin Island and Kamchatka (1968–1973). Volokhonsky emigrated to Israel in 1973, where she lived for two years. Having moved to the United States in 1975, she studied at Yale Divinity School (1977–1979) and at St Vladimir's Orthodox Theological Seminary (1979–1981), where her professors were the Orthodox theologians Alexander Schmemann and John Meyendorff. She completed her studies of theology with the diploma of Master of Divinity from Yale University. She began collaboration with her husband Pevear in 1985. Volokhonsky translated from English into Russian For the Life of the World by Alexander Schmemann (RBR, Inc, 1982) and Introduction to Patristic Theology by John Meyendorff (RBR, Inc, 1981). Both translations are still in print in Russia. Together with Pevear she translated into English some poetry and prose by her brother, Anri Volokhonsky (published in: Modern Poetry in Translation, New series. Ed. Daniel Weissbort. Vol 10, Winter 196, Grand Street, Spring 1989, ed. Ben Sonnenberg). Together with Emily Grosholz, she translated several poems by Olga Sedakova (The Hudson Review, Vol. 61, Issue 4, Winter 2009). Volokhonsky is mostly known for her work in collaboration with Pevear on the translation of Russian classics.

== Collaboration ==
Volokhonsky met Pevear in the United States in 1976 and they married six years later. The couple now live in Paris and have two trilingual children.

Pevear and Volokhonsky began working together when the former was reading Dostoevsky's The Brothers Karamazov and Volokhonsky noticed what she regarded to be the inadequacy of the translation by David Magarshack. As a result, the couple collaborated on their own version, producing three sample chapters which they sent to publishers. They were turned down by Random House and Oxford University Press but received encouragement from a number of Slavic scholars and were in the end accepted by North Point Press, a small publishing house in San Francisco who paid them a $1,000 advance. It went on to win a PEN/Book-of-the-Month Club Translation Prize. Their translation of Anna Karenina won another PEN/BOMC Translation Prize. Oprah Winfrey chose this translation of Anna Karenina as a selection for her "Oprah's Book Club" on her television program, which led to a major increase in sales of this translation and greatly increased recognition for Pevear and Volokhonsky. Their translation of Dostoevsky's The Idiot won the first Efim Etkind Translation Prize awarded by the European University of St. Petersburg.

The husband-and-wife team works in a two-step process: Volokhonsky prepares her English version of the original text, trying to follow Russian syntax and stylistic peculiarities as closely as possible, and Pevear turns this version into polished and stylistically appropriate English. Pevear has variously described their working process as follows:

"Larissa goes over it, raising questions. And then we go over it again. I produce another version, which she reads against the original. We go over it one more time, and then we read it twice more in proof."

"We work separately at first. Larissa produces a complete draft, following the original as closely as possible, with many marginal comments and observations. From that, plus the original Russian, I make my own complete draft. Then we work closely together to arrive at a third draft, on which we make our 'final' revisions."

Volokhonsky and Pevear were interviewed about the art of translation for Ideas, the long running Canadian Broadcasting Company (CBC) radio documentary. It was a 3-part program called "In Other Words" and involved discussions with many leading translators. The program was podcast in April 2007. Their translation of Leo Tolstoy's War and Peace was published on 16 October 2007 by Alfred A. Knopf. It was the subject of a month-long discussion in the "Reading Room" site of The New York Times Book Review. On October 18, 2007, they appeared at the New York Public Library in conversation with Keith Gessen to celebrate the publication.

Their translation of Svetlana Alexievich's book The Unwomanly Face of War: An Oral History of Women in World War II was published in 2017.

== Reception ==
Pevear and Volokhonsky have won awards for their translations and garnered critical praise. Writing in the Los Angeles Times, professor of Slavic languages and translator Michael Henry Heim praised their Fyodor Dostoevsky translations, stating "the reason they have succeeded so well in bringing Dostoevsky into English is not that they have made him sound bumpy or unnatural but that they have managed to capture and differentiate the characters' many voices." George Woodcock, a literary critic and essayist, wrote in The Sewanee Review that their Dostoevsky translations "have recaptured the rough and vulgar edge of Dostoevsky's style... [T]his tone of the vulgar that [made] Dostoevsky's writings... sometimes so poignantly sufficient and sometimes so morbidly excessive... [They have] retranslat[ed] Dostoevsky into a vernacular equal to his own." In 2007, critic James Wood wrote in The New Yorker that their Dostoevsky translations are "justly celebrated" and argued that previous translators of Leo Tolstoy's work had "sidestepp[ed] difficult words, smooth[ed] the rhythm of the Russian, and eliminat[ed] one of Tolstoy's most distinctive elements, repetition," whereas Pevear and Volokhonsky's translation of War and Peace captured the "spirit and order of the book." Literary critic Harold Bloom admired Pevear and Volokhonsky's translations of Russian classics, writing in his posthumously published book The Bright Book of Life: Novels to Read and Reread that he is "among their thousands of grateful debtors."

However, their work also has its critics. Writing in The New York Review of Books in 2016, the critic Janet Malcolm argued that Pevear and Volokhonsky "have established an industry of taking everything they can get their hands on written in Russian and putting it into flat, awkward English". The Slavic studies scholar Gary Saul Morson has written in Commentary that Pevear and Volokhonsky translations "take glorious works and reduce them to awkward and unsightly muddles". Morson, in fact, advises that "readers should never choose a translation by P&V if another exists". Criticism has been focused on the excessive literalness of the couple's translations and the perception that they miss the original tone of the authors. Linguist John McWhorter has also criticized their literalness, adding that, "surprisingly often", they "miss basic nuances of how Russian even works".

Their 2010 translation of Boris Pasternak's Doctor Zhivago met with adverse criticism from Pasternak's niece, Ann Pasternak Slater, in a book review for The Guardian, but earned praise for "powerful fidelity" from Angela Livingstone, a Ph.D. and translator who has translated some of Pasternak's writings into English, in The Times Literary Supplement.

== Bibliography ==
=== Translations credited to Pevear and Volokhonsky ===
Fyodor Dostoevsky

- The Brothers Karamazov (1990)
- Crime and Punishment (1992)
- Notes from Underground (1993)
- Demons (1994)
- The Eternal Husband and Other Stories (1997)
  - A Nasty Anecdote
  - The Eternal Husband
  - Bobok
  - The Meek One
  - The Dream of a Ridiculous Man
- The Idiot (2002)
- The Adolescent (2003)
- The Double (2005)
- The Gambler (2005)
- Notes from a Dead House (2015)

Svetlana Alexievich

- The Unwomanly Face of War (2017)

Mikhail Bulgakov

- The Master and Margarita (1997)

Nikolai Gogol

- The Collected Tales (1998)
- Dead Souls (1996)
- "The Inspector" With Richard Nelson (2014)

Leo Tolstoy

- What Is Art? (1996)
- Anna Karenina (2000)
- War and Peace (2007)
- The Death of Ivan Ilyich and Other Stories (2009)
- Hadji Murat (2012)

Anton Chekhov

- Selected Stories of Anton Chekhov (2000) - 30 short stories in total. ISBN 0-553-38100-8
- The Complete Short Novels (2004)
- The Cherry Orchard (2015) With Richard Nelson
- Uncle Vanya with Richard Nelson, premiered 10 February 2018 at Old Globe Theater,
- The Seagull (2017) with Richard Nelson
- Three Sisters (2020) with Richard Nelson
- Ivanov (2022) with Richard Nelson
- Fifty-Two Stories (2020)

Mother Maria Skobtsova

- Essential Writings (2002)

Boris Pasternak

- Doctor Zhivago (2010)

Ivan Turgenev

- A Month in the Country (2012) With Richard Nelson

Nikolai Leskov

- The Enchanted Wanderer: and Other Stories (2013)

Alexander Pushkin

- Novels, Tales, Journeys: The Complete Prose of Alexander Pushkin (2016)
- Boris Godunov, Little Tragedies, and Others: The Complete Plays (2023)

Mikhail Saltykov-Shchedrin

- Foolsburg: The History of a Town (2024)

=== Translations credited to Pevear ===
Alain

- The Gods (1974)

Jose Vincente Ortuño

- Bitter Roots (1978)

Jacques Mercier

- Ethiopian Magic Scrolls (1979)

Yves Bonnefoy

- Poems 1959-1975 (1985)
- Early Poems 1947-1959 (1991) - co-translated with Galway Kinnell

Alberto Savinio

- Childhood of Nivasio Dolcemare (1987)
- Signor Dido: Stories (2014)

Samuil Marshak

- The Pup Grew Up! (1989) - illustrated by Vladimir Radunsky
- Hail to Mail (1990) - illustrated by Vladimir Radunsky

Sophocles

- Aias (Ajax) (1999) - co-translated with Herbert Golder

Alexandre Dumas

- The Three Musketeers (2006)

Olga Medvedkova

- Going Where (2018)

Pevear's book Translating Music (2007) contains his translation of Alexander Pushkin's poem "The Tale of the Preacher and His Man Bumpkin" (Russian: Сказка о попе и о работнике его Балде).

Pevear commented in the introduction of his translation of The Three Musketeers (French: Les Trois Mousquetaires) that most modern translations available today are "textbook examples of bad translation practices" which "give their readers an extremely distorted notion of Dumas' writing."

== Sources ==
Bloom, Harold (2020). The Bright Book of Life: Novels to Read and Reread. New York: Knopf Doubleday Publishing Group. ISBN 978-0525657262.
