= Saint Petersburg State Chemical Pharmaceutical University =

University in Saint Petersburg, Russia

- Санкт-Петербургский государственный химико-фармацевтический университет
- Type: public
- Established: 1919
- Location: Saint Petersburg, Russia
- Campus: urban
- Language: Russian
- Website: spcpu.ru

Saint Petersburg State Chemical Pharmaceutical University (Russian: Санкт-Петербургский государственный химико-фармацевтический университет) is a public university located in Saint Petersburg, Russia. It was founded in 1919.

== History ==
On October 22, 1919, the Petrograd State Chemical-Pharmaceutical Institute (PCPI) was founded in Petrograd. Admission to the institute in 1919 was held at once for three courses, depending on the level of knowledge of the applicants. The applicants came from different parts of Soviet Russia, and more than a thousand people were admitted to the institute according to the results of examinations. However, the dropout rate after the first year of study was very high, since among them there were many people with low educational backgrounds, so the first graduates of the Institute were 140 specialists, five of whom received the degree of candidate of science along with the diploma.

In 1924 the institute was disbanded and affiliated as a chemical-pharmaceutical department of the Leningrad State University. In 1925 the staff of the institute was sent to the newly organized Chemical and Pharmaceutical Faculty at the 1st Leningrad Medical Institute, renamed in 1936 the Pharmaceutical Faculty.

During the Second World War the Institute continued its work and did not leave the besieged Leningrad until April 1942. In 1942 it was evacuated to Pyatigorsk and closed until the end of the war. It continued its work again in 1945. In 1947 there were 24 departments at the institute.

In 1949, LFI was renamed the Leningrad Chemical and Pharmaceutical Institute (LCPhI) and became subordinate to the Ministry of Health of the USSR. It began to specialize as an institution of higher education to train chemical and chemical technologists and microbiological engineers for chemical and pharmaceutical plants and antibiotic production plants.

Since 1965 the institute has been entitled to award doctoral theses, to award the degrees of Doctor of Pharmaceutical, Biological and Chemical Sciences. In the 1970s the institute was transferred to the Ministry of Medical Industry of the USSR and restructured. Two faculties remained in its structure - pharmaceutical and chemical-technological.

In 1990, the LCPhI was renamed the St. Petersburg Chemical and Pharmaceutical Institute (SPCPI), and in April 1996, the SPCPI was renamed the St. Petersburg State Chemical and Pharmaceutical Academy (SPCPA). Since March 2018, St. Petersburg State Chemical-Pharmaceutical Academy was renamed to St. Petersburg State Chemical-Pharmaceutical University (SPCPU).

== Structure ==
- Faculty of industrial drug technology
- Faculty of Pharmacy
- Department of Foreign Students
- Faculty of educational programs with CIS universities
- Pharmaceutical technical school
