= Bank Saint Petersburg =

PJSC Bank Saint Petersburg
- Native name: ПAO «Банк «Санкт-Петербург»
- Type: Public (ПAO)
- Traded as: MCX: BSPB
- Industry: Financial services
- Founded: 1990 (Saint Petersburg)
- Headquarters: Saint Petersburg, Russia
- Key people: Alexander V. Savelyev (CEO)
- Services: Banking
- Revenue: ▲US$ 356.7 million (2013)
- Operating income: 23,281,469,000 Russian ruble (2019)
- Net income: ▲US$ 91.8 million (2013)
- Total assets: ▲US$ 11.0 billion (2013)
- Rating: B1 (Moody's), BB− (Fitch) (2017)
- Website: www.bspb.ru

Bank Saint Petersburg is a Russian bank created in 1990 in Saint Petersburg. According to the bank website, Saint Petersburg Bank is mostly implemented in Northwest Russia. The bank is listed on Moscow Exchange. Located in Saint Petersburg and the Leningrad region, Alexander Savelyev is the chairman of the bank's management board.

== History ==
It was established on 3 October 1990 as a joint-stock company Lenbank, a year later it received its current name. In June 1998, St. Petersburg was the first among city banks to receive permission from the Central Bank of Russia to issue cash from card accounts.

In the fall of 2007, St. Petersburg was the first private bank in Russia that did IPO, received permission from the Federal Financial Markets Service to issue receipts, but further, refused listing on the foreign stock exchange (receipts were converted into ordinary shares that are now in circulation in the several number of Russian stock exchanges).

As of January 1, 2018, the bank served 1.93 million individuals and 50 thousand companies.

== Sanctions ==
Bank Saint Petersburg was sanctioned by the United States and the United Kingdom on 24 February 2023 in relation to the 2022 Russian invasion of Ukraine. The UK increased sanctions in December 2023 to prohibit correspondent banking relationships.

In March 2023, applications of Russian banks that were included in the updated sanctions list in February 2023 were removed from Google Play. Among them is the Bank St. Petersburg application. In addition, applications from the banks Uralsib, Zenit and MTS Bank were also removed from Google Play.

== Leadership ==
On 10/01/2016:

- Chairman of the Supervisory Board: Elena Ivannikova
- Chairman of the Board: Alexander Saveliev

== Financial indicators ==
According to the preliminary activities results in 2017 according to RAS, the bank had the following financial indicators:

== Foreign trade activity ==
VED 360 (Russian: ВЭД 360, from Vneshneekonomicheskaya deyatelnost 360, lit. Foreign Economic Activity 360) is a foreign-trade support project of Bank Saint Petersburg. It combines consulting, educational and workspace functions for companies engaged in foreign economic activity. The project provides services related to foreign economic activity, including banking services, consultation on international contracts, logistics, customs procedures and the verification of foreign counterparties. According to the project description published by Bankovskoye Obozreniye, its services are intended for exporters and importers.

The project was launched in Saint Petersburg in 2021. Its first centre was established in the head office of Bank Saint Petersburg. Bankovskoye Obozreniye reported that the project was created to combine the bank's expertise in international sphere with non-financial services for exporters and importers.

In 2023, a VED 360 centre was opened in Kaliningrad; a Moscow centre followed in 2024. In 2025, Bank Saint Petersburg introduced an online VED 360 service within its remote banking system for corporate customers.

== Awards ==
In 2023, Bank Saint Petersburg received a FINAWARD recognition for the work of the VED 360 centre during the period of high demand in 2022.

In 2025, the foreign economic activity division of Bank Saint Petersburg was named a laureate of the Best for Russia. Regional Development programme in connection with the expansion of support for exporters and importers.
